= Siege of Königsberg =

Siege by the Prussians in 1262

- Part of the Great Prussian uprising
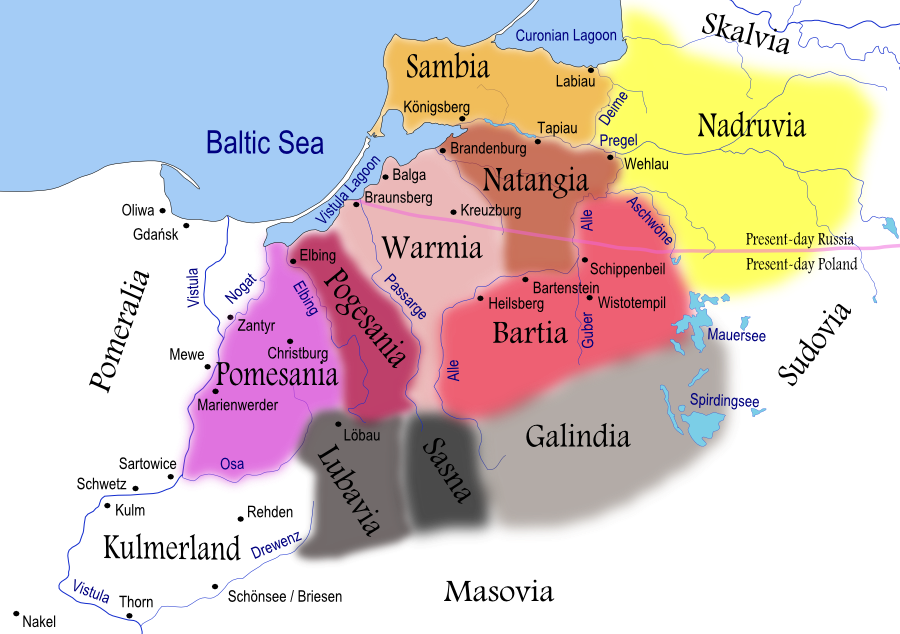
- Prussian tribes in the 13th century
Date	1262–1265?
Location	Königsberg (now Kaliningrad) 54°42′37″N 20°30′39″E
Result	Teutonic victory

Belligerents
Teutonic Knights	Prussians

The siege of Königsberg was a siege laid upon Königsberg Castle, one of the main strongholds of the Teutonic Knights, by Prussians during the great Prussian uprising from 1262 possibly though 1265.

== History ==
=== Background ===
Pagan Prussians rose against their conquerors, who tried to convert them to Christianity, after Lithuanians and Samogitians soundly defeated the joint forces of the Teutonic Knights and the Livonian Order in the Battle of Durbe in 1260. The first years of the uprising were successful for the Prussians, who defeated the Knights in open battles and besieged Teutonic castles. However, the Prussians faced great difficulties attacking and capturing the castles.

=== Battle of Kalgen ===
The Prussians had built small forts around Königsberg so that they could block any contact with the outside. Anno von Sangershausen, the Grand Master of the Knights, was working to provide relief to the starving garrison in Königsberg Castle. In January 1262 reinforcements arrived from the Rhineland, led by William IV, Count of Jülich, and Engelbert I, Count of the Mark. The crusading army arrived in the afternoon of 21 January 1262 and desired to attack the pagans right away, but decided to wait for the next morning. During the nighttime, the Prussians abandoned their forts and hid in a nearby forest. On the morning of 22 January, the crusaders thought that the Prussians had gone home to Sambia and Warmia. Stanteke, a Prussian scout loyal to the Knights, was wounded by Prussians after finding them hidden, but was able to escape to warn the Knights. Heavy fighting ensued southwest of Königsberg and the Prussians were driven into the village Kalgen. With the arrival of the Königsberg garrison as reinforcements, the Battle of Kalgen was won, with the Knights counting some 3,000 dead of their enemy. The Knights considered it revenge for the Prussians' victory in the Battle of Pokarben in Natangia, which occurred on the same day the previous year. The Rhinelanders soon returned home, however, and the Sambians renewed the siege.

=== Control of the Pregel ===
A Sambian leader, Nalube of Quednau, destroyed the initial settlement of Königsberg, later known as Steindamm, in 1262. Townspeople unable to reach safety in Königsberg Castle were slain or taken prisoner. The Knights had enough food and supply to last until Summer 1262 when they expected relief delivered via the Pregel River. However, the Sambian leader Glande transformed a few of his ships to war vessels to block the river. A sea captain from Lübeck, along with a crew of loyal Prussians, was able to infiltrate the Sambian blockade at night and sink some vessels. The besiegers then built a bridge of boats and wooden towers to protect it. The Knights, against the odds, succeeded in burning down both the bridge and fort. Reinforcements for the Sambians came from Herkus Monte of the Natangians.

=== End of the siege ===
The conclusion of the siege is disputed. Königsberg historian Richard Armstedt wrote that the starving Knights decided to fight a final open battle, from which the Prussians retreated in defeat. Andreas Johan Sjögren writes that Herkus Monte was wounded in the battle and most of his forces were captured while fleeing.

The Königsberg archivist Fritz Gause states that little is known of how the siege actually ended, that neither Armstedt nor historian Walther Franz provided a source for the final battle, and that the Teutonic chronicler Peter of Dusburg does not provide detail about it. Gause states the Prussians abandoned the siege in 1265, possibly having heard that Königsberg was to receive crusading reinforcements.

The Sambians withdrew because they could neither stop supplies and reinforcement from reaching the castle via the Pregel nor capture it. The siege proved the weakness of the Prussians and the strength of the Knights. The reliance upon fortified castles allowed the Knights to regroup and eventually subdue the uprising. Königsberg became a key staging ground for future crusading campaigns.
