= Siege of Bartenstein =

- Part of the Great Prussian Uprising
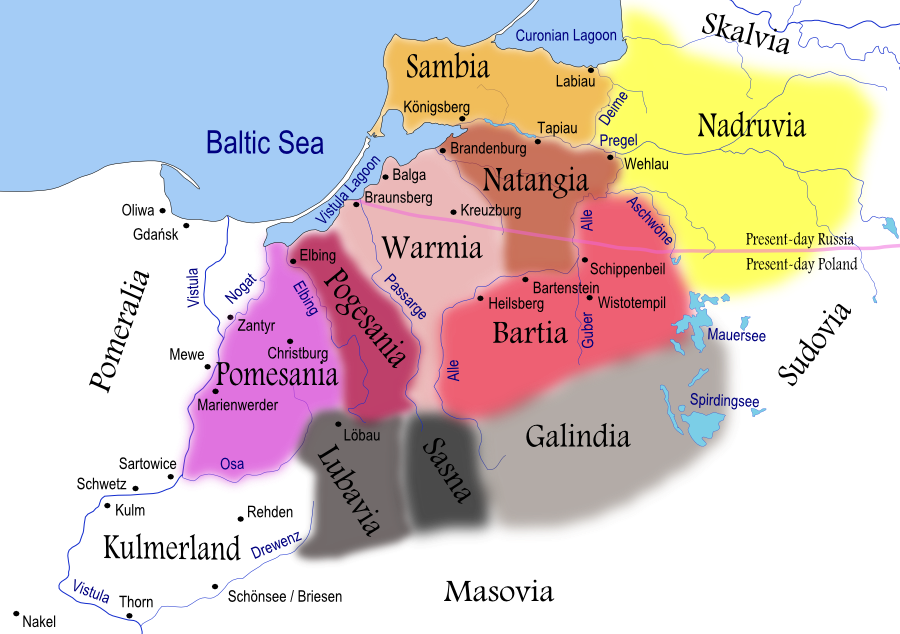
- Prussian tribes in the 13th century
Date	1264
Location	Bartenstein (now Bartoszyce) 54°15′04″N 20°48′39″E
Result	Teutonic victory

Belligerents
Teutonic Knights	Prussians

Strength
400	1,300

Siege of Bartenstein was a medieval siege laid upon the castle of Bartenstein (now Bartoszyce in Poland) by the Prussians during the Great Prussian Uprising. Bartenstein and Rößel (Reszel) were the two major Teutonic strongholds in Barta, one of the Prussian lands. The castle endured years of siege until 1264 and was one of the last to fall into the hands of the Prussians.

The garrison in Bartenstein numbered 400 against 1,300 Bartians who lived in three forts surrounding the city. Such tactics were very common in Prussia: build your own forts so that any communication with the outside world would be cut off. However, at Bartenstein the forts were far enough away to allow the castle to send out men on raids of the surrounding area. Local noble Miligedo, who showed the Knights secret ways in the area, was killed by the Prussians. The Knights managed to burn down all three forts when Bartians were celebrating a religious holiday. However, they soon returned and rebuilt the forts.

Bartenstein was running out of supplies and no help was coming from the headquarters of the Teutonic Knights. They had already eaten their horses, so the only way to escape was on foot. Therefore they decided to trick the Prussians in order to gain a lead. The Knights remained silent inside the castle and did not ring the bell for church service. Such silence tricked the Bartians to believe that the soldiers had fled and they came to examine the castle. Once they were close enough the Knights attacked them with arrows and stones. This was repeated three times, and when the Knights actually fled, they left one old blind man behind to ring the church bell. This allowed them to gain several days and safely reach Königsberg and Elbing (Elbląg).

Other castles at Wistotempil, Schippenbeil (Sępopol), and Kreuzburg (Slavskoye) fell sometime in 1263. The castles presented a definite threat to the Bartians and Warmians, who had to keep their armies at home and could not participate in the wider uprising.
