= Glappo =

Glappo (or Glappe) (baptized as Charles or Carolus) was the leader of Warmians, one of the Prussian clans, during the Great Prussian Uprising (1260–1274) against the Teutonic Knights.

In 1249 Pope Urban IV had installed the papal legate Jacob Pantaleon to aid the Teutonic Order and after the battle at the Durbe, the pope called for a crusade against the Prussians and sent knights who were on their way against the Tatars back to the crusades against the Prussians. During those crusades and as a result the unbaptized parts of the Prussians began uprisings and Glappo and his men successfully captured Braunsberg. When Glappo ambushed and killed forty people who left the castle to gather firewood and fodder, the Bishop of Warmia decided against trying to defend the town and abandoned it.

In 1266 large reinforcements for the Teutonic Knights, led by Otto III and John I, co-rulers of Brandenburg, arrived to Prussia. They built a castle on the border of Warmian and Natangian lands between Balga and Königsberg and named it Brandenburg (now Ushakovo). When a native woman informed Glappo that most of the soldiers were away on a raid and the place is practically unguarded, Warmians attacked and captured the outer walls and the towers. When Teutonic soldiers returned, they did not try to recapture the castle. The very next year Duke Otto was back to rebuild the castle. Glappo was killed trying to recapture Brandenburg.

In 1273, at the very end of the uprising, Warmians besieged Brandenburg, but did not put sufficient guards on the road from Königsberg. This allowed the Knights to attack the Prussians from the rear. Warmians suffered a crushing defeat and Glappo was captured. He was later hanged on a hill outside Königsberg that is sometimes referred to as "Glappo's hill" (Glappenberg). He was the last important Prussian leader, and after his death only Pogesanians were left fighting.
