= Glande =

Prussian leader

Glande (baptized as Richard) was the leader of Sambians, one of the Prussian clans, during the Great Prussian Uprising (1260–1274) against the papal crusades undertaken by the Teutonic Knights. There is nothing known about his life or achievements, except that once the uprising started, Sambians elected him as their leader.

The Prussian duke Glande was felled by a spear and his aid Swayno fell soon after. In the confusion and hopelessness, the Samlandians retreated to their villages. Hercus Monte came to their aid, but was also heavily wounded by a spear. Samlandians were the first tribe to give up the fight and surrendered in 1265.
