= Treaty of Christburg =

1249 treaty between pagan Prussians and the Teutonic Knights

The Treaty of Christburg (modern Dzierzgoń in Poland) was a peace treaty signed on 2 February 1249 between the pagan Prussian clans, represented by a papal legate, and the Teutonic Knights. It is often cited as the end of the First Prussian Uprising, but it was not adhered to or enforced, especially after the Battle of Krücken in November 1249, where Prussians massacred and tortured to death 54 knights who had surrendered. The treaty guaranteed personal rights to all Prussians who converted to Christianity, but it did nothing to establish peace as many Prussians did not wish to convert and the Knights swore to root out paganism. It is one of the few documents from the period that survive in full to this day. It provides a useful insight into the life and religious tensions in pagan Prussia. It also offers a small glimpse into the Prussian mythology and traditions.

== Background ==
In 1230 the Teutonic Knights, a Roman Catholic religious order, settled in the Chełmno Land and began their crusade against the pagan Prussians. By 1241 five of the seven major Prussian clans had surrendered to the Knights. Then the First Uprising broke out. Prussians forged an alliance with Świętopełk II of Pomerania, a Polish duke who quarreled with the knights over the succession in Pomerania. At first the rebels were successful, and the Knights were reduced to just five of their strongest castles. However, Świętopełk lost several battles and was forced to make peace. Substantial reinforcements, encouraged by the pope, arrived from Germany to help the Knights and eventually the uprising was subdued.

By 1246, Pope Innocent IV had appointed his chaplain, Jacob of Liège, the future Pope Urban IV, to mediate in the conflict and produce a peace treaty. However, he was not able to achieve much until 1248. In September, Świętopełk agreed to a truce and signed the final peace treaty on 24 November 1248. The Prussians, left without their greatest supporter, had to agree to negotiations. Since the pope considered himself to be the suzerain of the Prussians, his legate signed the treaty in his name and that of the Prussians. Although only Pomesanians agreed to the treaty, it was also signed in the name of the Warmians and the Natangians. The treaty was signed in Christburg (now Dzierzgoń) which the Knights built on the site of a major Pomesanian fortress that they had captured on the Christmas Eve of 1247.

== Terms ==
The preamble emphasized that the Teutonic Knights had broken their promises to previous popes to respect the newly converted locals and guarantee their freedom. The treaty did not address the political situation, but only guaranteed personal rights of the converts and demanded they embrace Christianity. They could inherit, acquire, and exchange real and personal property. Sales of real estate were possible only between people of the same nationality, but the Knights were entitled to a portion of the proceeds. This provision tried to prevent the seller escaping to the enemies. Property could be bequeathed not only to sons, as before, but also to daughters and other relatives. The amount of attention paid to property rights suggests that the Knights were often violating them. The converts were also promised opportunities to become priests or monks, and those of noble origins could even hope at becoming a knight, a real brother of the Teutonic Knights. Converts also had a right to sue and be sued in the secular and religious courts according to Polish law. The rights were guaranteed only as long as the person observed Christian rites and had not committed a sin, which provided sufficient possibility of abuse by the Knights.

Prussians were forbidden to wed to more than one wife, and only a marriage with a proper Christian ceremony at a church was legal. Selling or buying women in marriage was forbidden as was marrying stepmothers, sisters-in-law, or wives of deceased relatives within four generations. Some other pagan rituals were expressively forbidden: worship of Curche, the god of harvest and grain; maintaining pagan priests (Tulissones vel Ligaschones), who performed certain rituals at funerals; cremation of the dead with horses, persons, arms, or any other property.

The Prussians were required to build and supply with land, livestock, and other necessities thirteen churches in Pomesania, six in Warmia, and three in Natangia within half a year. The churches were to be so beautiful that pagans would rather pray inside them than in the forests. Prussians were also required to pay an annual tithe in grain and participate in the Teutonic campaigns armed with their own weapons and provided with their own food. Alliances against the Knights were forbidden.

== Aftermath ==
As the treaty did not address the needs of those who did not wish to convert, fighting soon broke out again. In November 1249, the Teutonic Knights suffered a great defeat at Krücken, which earned Prussians the reputation as an uncivilized people with no honor. Further fighting followed and Świętopełk offered his help. War ended in 1253, and some cite this date as the end of the First Uprising. The treaty was then superseded and remained only as an interesting historical document.
