= Lobau (disambiguation) =

Lobau is a floodplain in Vienna.

Löbau is a city in Saxony, Germany.

Lobau or Löbau may also refer to:

- German name for Lubawa, town formerly in West Prussia, currently in Poland
- Battle of Löbau, fought near Lubawa in 1263
- The former district of Löbau-Zittau in Saxony
- Lobau River, a river of Viti Levu, Fiji

== People ==
- Georges Mouton, comte de Lobau (1770–1838), Marshal of France
- Eduard Lobau (born 1988), Belarusian activist
- Eva Löbau (born 1972), Austrian actress
