= Sambians =

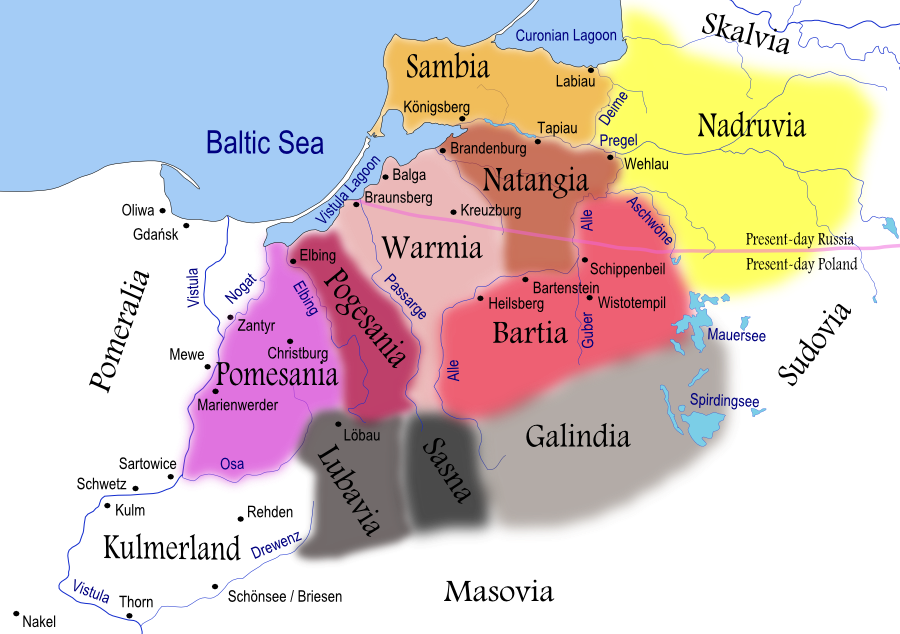
- Sambians (in orange) and other Prussian clans during the 13th century

Total population
- Extinct in 17th–18th century

Regions with significant populations

Languages
- Old Prussian, later also German

Religion
- Prussian mythology (Paganism) later Christianity

Related ethnic groups
- Other Prussians and Balts

The Sambians were a Prussian tribe. They inhabited the Sambia Peninsula north of the city of Königsberg (now Kaliningrad). Sambians were located in a coastal territory rich in amber and engaged in trade early on (see Amber Road). Therefore, they established contacts with foreign nations before any other Prussians. However, as with all other Prussians, they were conquered by the Teutonic Knights, and, exposed to assimilation and Germanization, became extinct sometime in the 17th century.

The Sambians bordered the Natangians in the south, and the Nadruvians in the east.

== History ==
Engaged in the amber trade, Sambia was the richest and most densely populated region of Prussia. It provides a wealth of artifacts from the Bronze Age, including imported goods from the Roman Empire. Sambians, unlike other Prussians, did not cremate their dead. They built earth barrows above graves and surrounded them with stone circles. The name of the clan was first mentioned in 1073 by Adam of Bremen, who calls them "most humane people". Warfare with Danes continued from the mid-9th century to beginning of the 13th century. It is known that there was Wiskiauten, a Viking settlement in Sambia, that flourished for about 300 years. Swedes maintained more peaceful relations and fostered trade.

The 13th century saw the rise of another enemy, the Teutonic Knights, a crusading military order from the Holy Roman Empire. Its goal was to conquer all pagans and convert them to Roman Catholicism. The conquest of Sambia during the Prussian Crusade was delayed by the First Prussian Uprising that broke out in 1242. The uprising technically ended in 1249 by signing the Treaty of Christburg, but skirmishes lasted for four more years. Only in 1254–1255 could the Knights arrange a large campaign against the Sambians. King Ottokar II of Bohemia participated in the expedition and as a tribute the Knights named the newly founded Königsberg Castle in his honor. The Sambians rose against the Knights during the Great Prussian Uprising (1260–1274), but were the first ones to surrender. When other clans tried to resurrect the uprising in 1276 Theodoric, vogt of Sambia convinced the Sambians not to join the insurrection; Natangians and Warmians followed the Sambian lead and the uprising was crushed within a year. In 1243, the Bishopric of Samland (Sambia) was established as the church administration of the region, as arranged by the papal legate William of Modena. At the end of the 13th century, Sambians numbered only about 22,000. They gave in to Germanization later than western tribes that were conquered earlier. In 1454, the region was incorporated by King Casimir IV Jagiellon into the Kingdom of Poland. After the subsequent Thirteen Years' War (1454–1466) the Teutonic Order regained authority over the region as a fief of the Polish Crown. After 1525 it was held by secular Ducal Prussia.

According to Peter von Dusburg, Sambia was subdivided in 15 territorial units. Their German names (from east to west) are: Germau, Medenau, Rinau, Pobeten, Wargen, Rudau, Laptau, Quedenau, Schaaken, Waldau, Caimen, Tapiau, Labiau, Laukischken, and Wehlau.
