= Battle of Krücken =

1249 battle between Teutonic Knights and Old Prussians

- Part of the Prussian Crusades
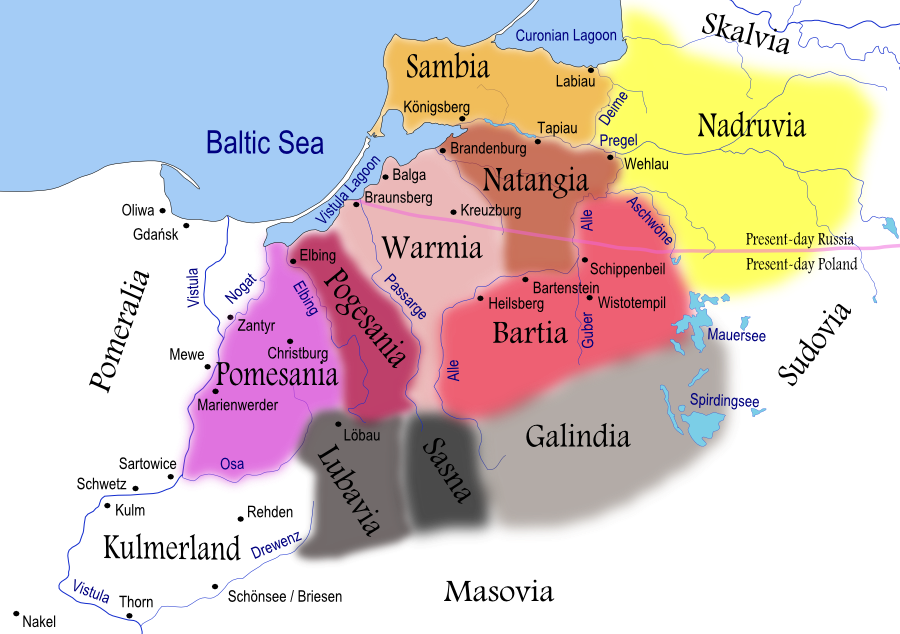
- Prussian tribes in the 13th century
Date	29 November 1249
Location	Near small village of Krücken (now Kamenka, Kaliningrad Oblast) 54.4476°N 20.4495°E
Result	Prussian victory

Belligerents
Prussians (Natangians)	Teutonic Order

Commanders and leaders
Unknown	Marshal Heinrich Botel

Casualties and losses
Unknown	54 knights & many lower-rank soldiers killed

The Battle of Krücken was a medieval battle fought in 1249 during the Prussian Crusades between the Teutonic Order and Prussians, one of the Baltic tribes. In terms of knights killed, it was the fourth largest defeat of the Teutonic Knights in the 13th century.

Marshal Heinrich Botel gathered men from Kulm, Elbing, and Balga for an expeditionary attack deeper into Prussia. They traveled into the lands of the Natangians and pillaged the region. On their way back, they were in turn attacked by an army of Natangians. The knights retreated to the nearby village of Krücken south of Kreuzburg (now Kamenka south of Slavskoye), where Prussians hesitated to attack. The Prussian army was growing as fresh troops arrived from more distant territories, and the Order did not have enough supplies to withstand a siege. Therefore, the Teutonic Order negotiated a surrender: the marshal and three other knights were to remain as hostages while the others were to lay down their weapons.

The Natangians broke the agreement and massacred 54 knights and a number of their followers. Some knights were executed in religious ceremonies or tortured to death. The severed head of Johann, vice-komtur of Balga, was mockingly displayed on a spear. Others were ransomed or exchanged, including Marshal Botel. Such barbarity gave the Teutonic Order an excuse not to treat the Prussians as civilized and honorable people. Never again did the knights surrender to pagans. The Natangians did not exploit their victory and did not make offensive moves into the lands of the Teutonic Order. It took two years for the crusading military order to recover and avenge the massacre.
