= Prussian uprisings =

13th-century revolts by Old Prussians against the Teutonic Knights

Baltic tribes and Prussian clans c. 1200

The Prussian uprisings were two major and three smaller uprisings by the Old Prussians, one of the Baltic tribes, against the Teutonic Knights that took place in the 13th century during the Prussian Crusade. The crusading military order, supported by the Popes and Christian Europe, sought to conquer and convert the pagan Prussians. In the first ten years of the crusade, five of the seven major Prussian clans fell under the control of the less numerous Teutonic Knights. However, the Prussians rose against their conquerors on five occasions.

The first uprising was supported by Duke Swietopelk II, Duke of Pomerania. The Prussians were successful at first, reducing the Knights to only five of their strongest castles. The duke then suffered a series of military defeats and was eventually forced to make peace with the Teutonic Knights. With Duke Swietopelk's support for the Prussians broken, a prelate of Pope Innocent IV negotiated a peace treaty between the Prussians and the Knights. This treaty was never honored or enforced, especially after the Prussian victory in the Battle of Krücken at the end of 1249.

The second uprising, known in historiography as "the great Prussian uprising", was prompted by the 1260 Battle of Durbe, the largest defeat suffered by the Teutonic Knights in the 13th century. This uprising was the longest, largest, and most threatening to the Teutonic Order, who again were reduced to five of their strongest castles. Reinforcements for the Knights were slow to arrive, despite repeated encouragements from Pope Urban IV, and the position of the Order looked set to worsen. The Prussians lacked unity and a common strategy and reinforcements finally reached Prussia in around 1265. One by one, the Prussian clans surrendered and the uprising was ended in 1274.

The later three lesser uprisings relied on foreign assistance and were suppressed within one or two years. The last uprising in 1295 effectively ended the Prussian Crusade, and Prussia became a Christian territory with a number of settlers from different German states.

== Background ==
Timeline of Teutonic conquest
Year	Prussian clan
1233–1237	Pomesanians
1237	Pogesanians
1238–1241	Warmians, Natangians, Bartians
1252–1257	Sambians
1274–1275	Nadruvians

Although the Prussians repelled early incursions by the Order of Dobrzyń, they were outnumbered by attacks from Poland, Ruthenians in the southeast and the Teutonic Knights from the west. The Teutonic Order was called to the Culmerland in 1226 by Konrad I of Masovia, who began a number of expeditions and crusades against the Prussians and later asked the Knights to protect him from raids by the Prussians. Preoccupied with crusades in the Holy Land, the Teutonic Knights arrived only in 1230. Their first task was to build a base on the left bank of Vistula at Vogelsang, opposite of Toruń (Thorn), which was completed a year later. Led by Hermann Balk, the Knights did not repeat the mistakes of the previous Order and did not push eastwards into the forest of the interior. They would further build fortified log (later brick and stone) castles along major rivers and the Vistula Lagoon to serve as basis for future expansion. In 1231–1242, forty such castles were built. The Prussians faced major difficulties in capturing these castles as they were accustomed only to combat in open fields. Most conflicts occurred either in summer or winter. Heavily armoured knights could not travel and fight on land soaked by water from melting snow or autumn rains. Summer campaigns were most dangerous as the Knights would immediately build new castles in the conquered territory. The Teutonic Knight's strategy proved successful: in ten years, five of the seven major Prussian clans fell under control of the less-numerous Teutonic Knights. However, the Prussians further resisted the conquerors, leading to five uprisings over the following fifty years.

== First Prussian uprising (1242–1249) ==
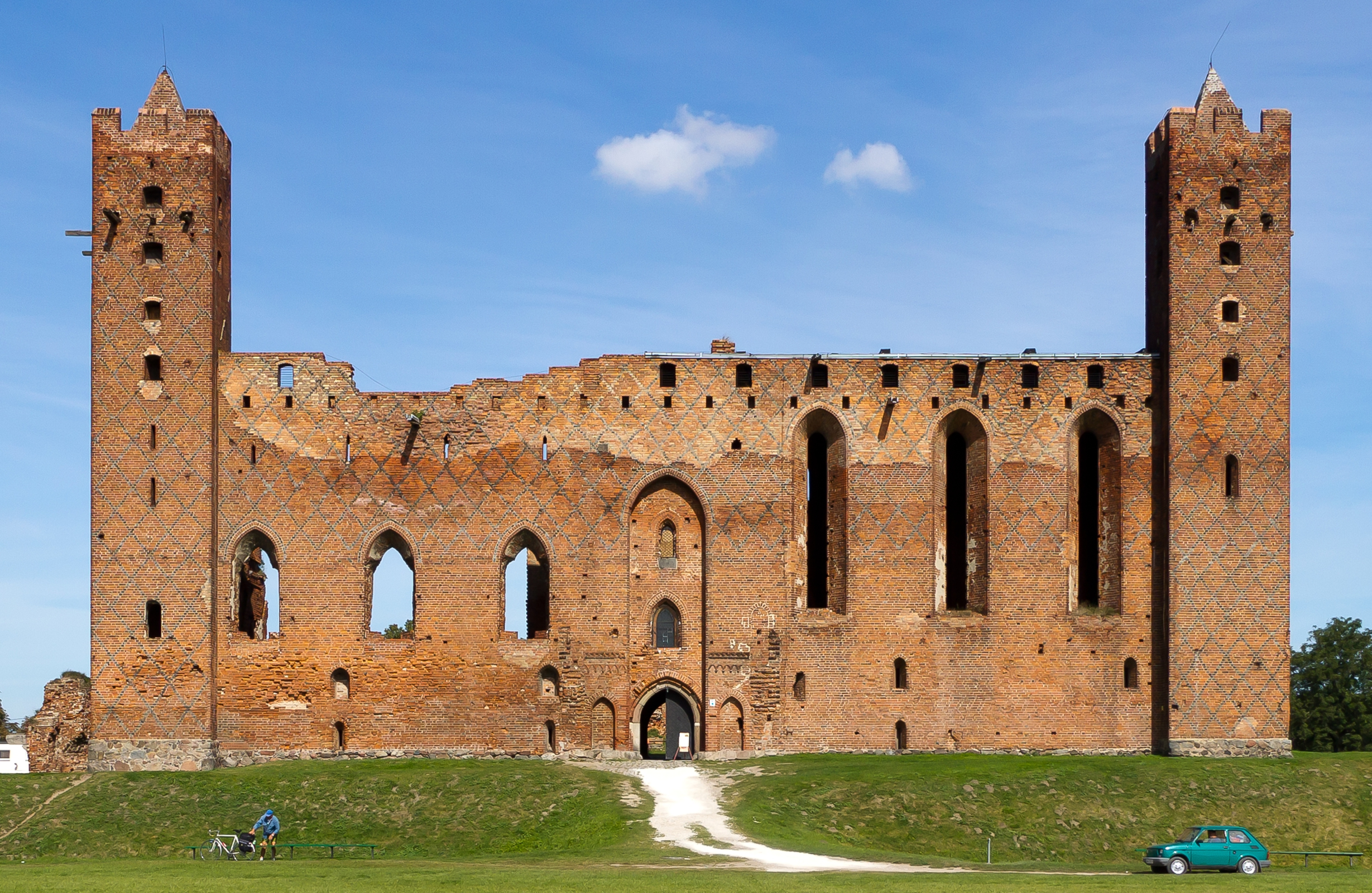
Ruins of the Teutonic castle in Rehden (today Radzyń Chełmiński Castle). It was one of five castles not captured by the Prussians.

The first Prussian uprising was influenced by three major events. Firstly, the Livonian Knights – a subsidiary of the Teutonic Knights – lost the Battle on the Ice on Lake Peipus to Alexander Nevsky in April 1242. Secondly, southern Poland was devastated by a Mongol invasion in 1241; Poland lost the Battle of Legnica and the Teutonic Knights lost one of its most trusted allies that often supplied troops. Thirdly, Duke Swantopolk II of Pomerania was fighting against the Knights, who supported his brothers' dynastic claims against him. It has been implied that the new castles of the Knights were competing with his lands over the trade routes along the Vistula River. While some historians embrace the Swantopolk–Prussian alliance without hesitation, others are more careful. They point out that the historical information came from documents written by the Teutonic Knights and must have been ideologically charged to persuade the Pope to declare a crusade not only against the pagan Prussians but also against the Christian duke.

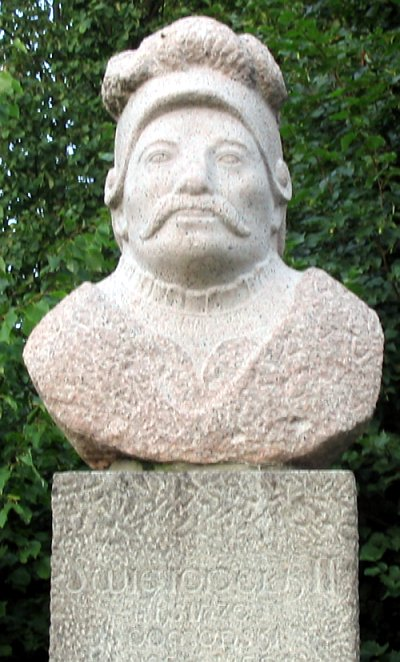
Statue for Swantopolk II of Pomerania in a park in Oliwa

Prussians besieged Teutonic castles and managed to capture all except for Elbing (Elbląg) and Balga in the eastern regions of Natangia, Barta and Warmia; Thorn (Toruń), Culm (Chełmno), and Rehden (Radzyń Chełmiński) in the western parts. In December 1242, the Knights were able to capture Sartowice, Swantopolk's castle on the banks of the Vistula. The ensuing five-week siege of Sartowice failed to recapture the fortress and Swantopolk lost 900 men. In the spring of 1243, Swantopolk also lost the castle at Nakel (Nakło nad Notecią), which dominated trade on the Noteć River. In the face of these losses, the duke was forced to make a short-lived truce. In the summer of 1243, Prussians with Sudovian help raided the Culmerland (Chełmno Land) and, on their way back, defeated the pursuing Teutonic Knights on 15 June on the banks of the Osa River. Some 400 Teutonic soldiers perished, including their marshal. Swantopolk, encouraged by the defeat, gathered an army of 2,000 men and unsuccessfully besieged Culm (Chełmno).

The Teutonic Knights managed to gather a coalition against Swantopolk: Dukes of Masovia were given territories in Prussia, Dukes of Greater Poland received Nakel, and Dukes of Pomerellia, brothers of Swantopolk, hoped to regain their inheritance. Swantopolk built a castle at Zantyr, where Nogat separated from the Vistula, and launched a blockade of Elbing and Balga. While the castle withstood Teutonic attacks, the blockade was smashed by cogs. In late 1245 Swantopolks's army suffered a great defeat at S(ch)wetz Świecie, and another one in early 1246, where 1,500 Pomeranians were killed. Swantopolk II asked for a truce and Pope Innocent IV appointed his chaplain, Jacob of Liège, the future Pope Urban IV, to handle the peace negotiations. However, the war was renewed in 1247 when large Teutonic reinforcements arrived in Prussia. On Christmas Eve of 1247 the Knights besieged and overwhelmed a major Pomeranian fortress, which they later renamed Christburg (Dzierzgoń), and newly arrived Henry III, Margrave of Meissen subdued the Pogesanians. Swantopolk retaliated and destroyed Christburg, but the Knights rebuilt it in a new location. Both Prussian and Swantopolk's armies failed to capture the new castle. Otto III of Brandenburg raided Warmia and Natangia, forcing the locals to surrender.

The peace talks that began in 1247 achieved little, but a new truce was arranged in September 1248 and peace was made on 24 November 1248. Swantopolk had to return lands seized from his brothers, allow Teutonic Knights to pass through his domains, stop charging tolls on ships using the Vistula, and stop any aid to the Prussians. Prussians were compelled to sign the Treaty of Christburg on 7 February 1249. The treaty provided personal freedom and rights to newly converted Christians. It formally ended the uprising, but already in November 1249 the Natangians defeated the Knights at the Battle of Krücken. The skirmishes lasted until 1253 and some sources cite this year as the end of the uprising. At that point the treaty ceased its political power but remained an interesting historical document.

== Great Prussian uprising (1260–1274) ==
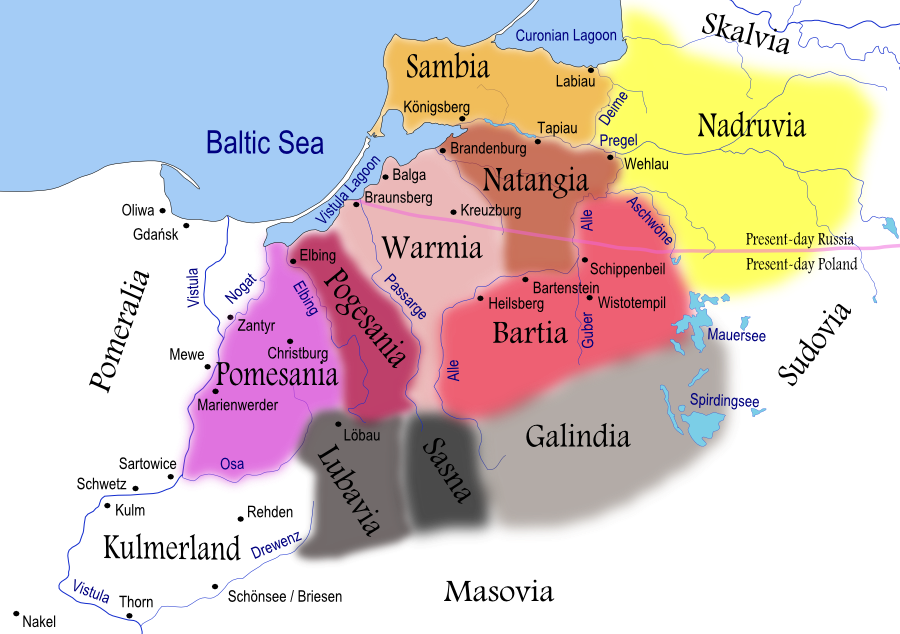
Map of the Prussian clans in the 13th century

Schematic map of the second uprising

=== Preparation and tactics ===
The major revolt began on 20 September 1260. It was triggered by the Lithuanian and Samogitian military victory against the joint forces of the Livonian Order and Teutonic Knights in the Battle of Durbe. As the uprising was spreading through Prussian lands, each clan chose a leader: the Sambians were led by Glande, the Natangians by Herkus Monte, the Bartians by Diwanus, the Warmians by Glappe, the Pogesanians by Auktume. One clan that did not join the uprising was the Pomesanians. The uprising was also supported by Skomantas, leader of the Sudovians. However, there was no one leader to coordinate efforts of these different forces. Herkus Monte, who was educated in Germany, became the best known and most successful of the leaders, but he commanded only his Natangians.

The Prussians besieged many castles that the Knights had built and could not send large armies to fight in the west. Prussians were not familiar with Western European siege tactics and machinery and relied on siege forts, built around the castle, to cut the supplies to the garrisons. The Teutonic Knights could not raise large armies to deliver supplies to the starving garrisons and smaller castles began to fall. Those castles were usually destroyed and the Prussians manned just a few castles, notably one in Heilsberg (Lidzbark Warmiński), because they lacked technology to defend the captured castles and organization to provide food and supplies to stationed garrisons. On 29 August 1261 Jacob of Liège, who negotiated the Treaty of Christburg after the first uprising, was elected as Pope Urban IV. He, having an inside scope on events in Prussia, was especially favourable to the Teutonic Knights and issued 22 papal bulls in three years of his papacy calling for reinforcements to the Knights. However, the reinforcements were slow to come as dukes of Poland and Germany were preoccupied with their own disputes and the Livonian Order was fighting the Semigallian uprising.

=== Early Prussian success ===
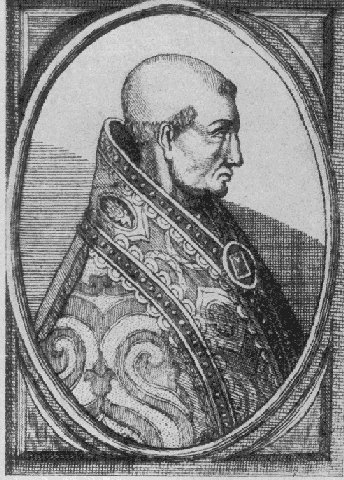
Pope Urban IV (1261–1264) was especially supportive of the Teutonic cause in Prussia. He served as a papal prelate negotiating the Treaty of Christburg after the first Prussian uprising.

The first reinforcement to the Teutonic forces arrived in early 1261, but was wiped out on 21 January 1261 by Herkus Monte in the Battle of Pokarwis. In January 1262 reinforcements arrived from the Rhineland, led by Wilhelm VII, Duke of Jülich, who was obliged by Pope Alexander IV to fulfil his crusader duties in Prussia. This army broke the siege of Königsberg but as soon as the army returned home, the Sambians resumed the siege and were reinforced by Herkus Monte and his Natangians. Herkus was later injured and the Natangians retreated, leaving the Sambians unable to stop supplies reaching the castle and the siege eventually failed. Prussians were more successful capturing castles deeper into the Prussian territory (with an exception of Wehlau, now Znamensk), and the Knights were left only with strongholds in Balga, Elbing, Culm, Thorn, and Königsberg. Most castles fell in 1262–1263, and Bartenstein fell in 1264. The Prussians destroyed captured forts instead of using them for their own defence, so the end of successful sieges meant that large Prussian forces did not have to stay near their home and were then free to operate in other parts of Prussia, raiding the Culmerland and Kuyavia.

A recovered Herkus Monte raided Culmerland with a large force and took many prisoners in 1263. While returning to Natangia, Herkus and his men were confronted by a contingent of their enemies. In the Battle of Löbau that ensued, Prussians killed 40 knights, including the Master and the Marshal. The Prussians also received help from Lithuanians and Sudovians. In summer of 1262 Treniota and Shvarn attacked Masovia, killing Duke Siemowit I, and raided Culmerland, provoking Pogesanians to join the uprising. The assassination of King Mindaugas of Lithuania and subsequent dynastic fights prevented Lithuanians from further campaigns. Skomantas, leader of Sudovians, raided Culm (Chełmno) in 1263 and in 1265.

=== Turning point ===
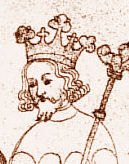
King Ottokar II of Bohemia participated twice in the Prussian Crusade: in 1254, when he founded Königsberg, named in his honor, and in 1267, when he helped to suppress the Great Prussian Uprising.

The year of 1265 was the turning point in the uprising: more substantial reinforcements for the Teutonic Knights started arriving in Prussia and Sambia abandoned the fight. Teutonic castles in Königsberg and Wehlau on the Pregel River cut off the region from the rest of Prussia. Supplies to Königsberg were brought by sea, and the castle served as the basis for raids in surrounding Samland (Sambia). The Livonian Order sent troops to Königsberg and the joint forces defeated the Sambians in a decisive battle forcing them to surrender. In 1265 reinforcements arrived from Germany: armies of Duke Albrecht of Braunschweig and Margrave Albert of Meissen arrived in Prussia, but were unable to achieve much. In 1266 Otto III and John I, co-rulers of Brandenburg, built a castle in the Natangian lands between Balga and Königsberg and named it Brandenburg (since 1945 Ushakovo). Due to bad weather they did not organize campaigns into Prussian lands.

When the Dukes returned home, Brandenburg was captured by Glappe and his Warmians. The very next year Otto returned to rebuild the castle. Both John and Otto died before the end of 1267, and Otto's son was killed in a tournament. Subsequent Dukes of Brandenburg were not as supportive of the Knights. In 1266 Duke Swantopolk, the supporter of the Prussians during the First Uprising, died and his sons Mestwin and Warcisław briefly joined the Prussians in the uprising. In 1267 King Ottokar II of Bohemia, who already participated in the Prussian Crusade in 1254 and who was promised by Pope Urban IV all Prussian lands he could conquer, finally arrived in Prussia. His only achievement was forcing Duke Mestwin to reconcile with the Teutonic Knights. His large army was unable to campaign due to an early thaw: heavily armed knights could hardly fight during the wet and swampy spring season.

The warfare with the Prussians relied on guerilla raids in the border regions. Small groups of men, a dozen to a hundred, made quick raids on farms, villages, border posts, etc. This was a positional warfare where neither side could defeat the other, but the Teutonic Knights relied on future reinforcements from Germany and Europe, while Prussians were draining their local resources. After the massacre of surrendered Teutonic soldiers in the Battle of Krücken in 1249, the Knights refused to negotiate with the Prussians. The Prussians were also unable to coordinate their efforts and develop a common strategy: while each clan had its own leader, there was no single leader of all the clans. The Natangians had to watch for attacks from Balga, Brandenburg, Wehlau, and Königsberg while the Warmians were threatened by garrisons at Christburg and Elbing. This way only Diwane and his Bartians were able to continue the war in the west. They made several minor expeditions to Culmerland each year.

=== End of the uprising ===
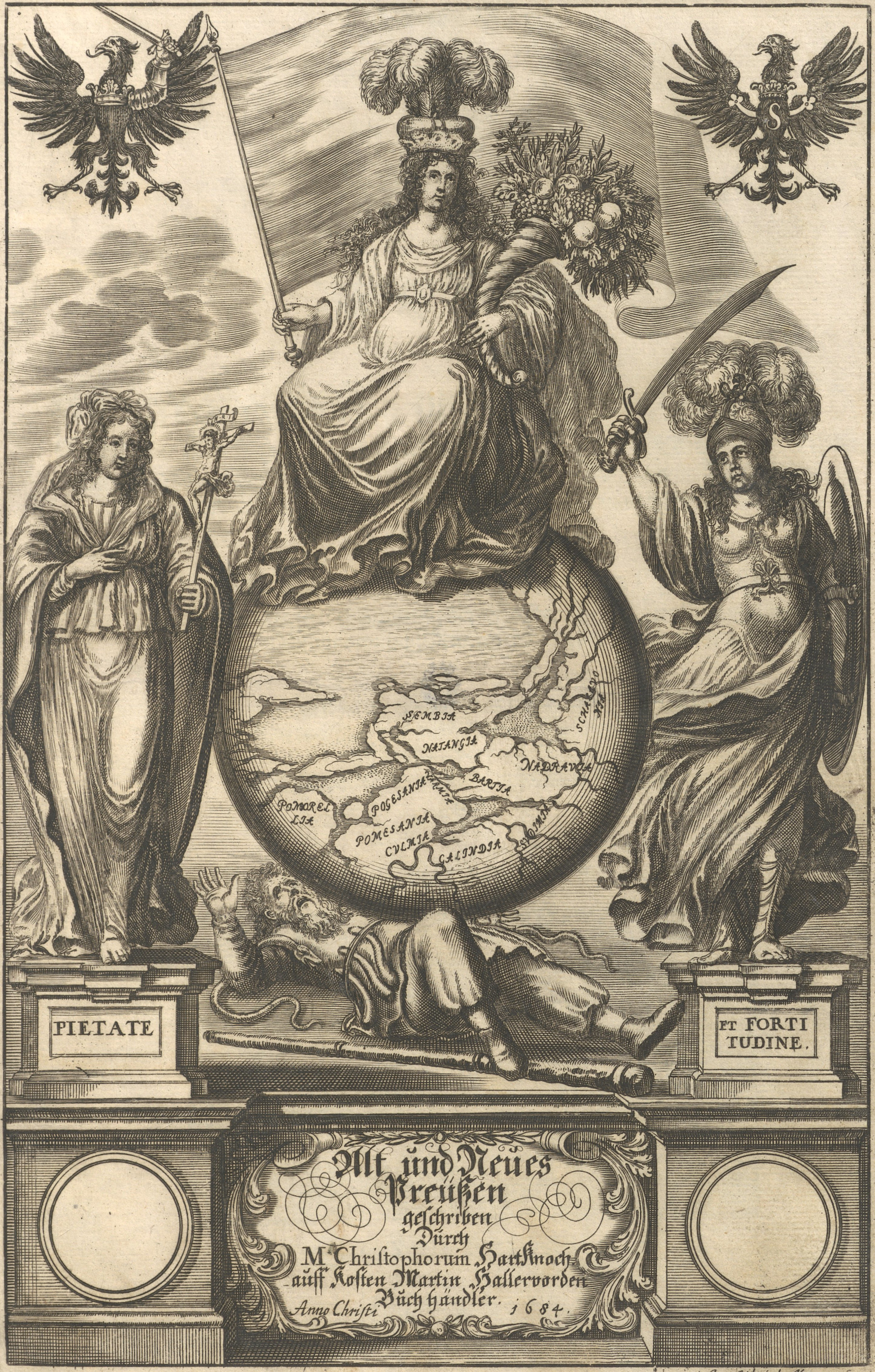
A non-contemporary illustration of Teutonic triumph in Prussia: a native Prussian man is crushed by the victorious Teutonic Knights (Christoph Hartknoch, 1684)

The major Prussian offensive was organized in 1271 together with Linka, leader of the Pogesanians. The Bartian infantry and Pogesanians besieged a border castle, but were fended off by the Knights from Christburg. The Prussians who managed to escape joined their cavalry while the Knights established a camp on the opposite bank of the Dargune River (Dzierzgoń River), blocking the route home. When Christians retired for the night, one half of the Prussian army crossed the river in a distance, to attack the Knights from the rear, while the other half charged straight across the river. The Knights were encircled. The Battle of Paganstin saw twelve knights and 500 men killed. The Prussians immediately assaulted Christburg and almost captured it. The Prussians were looting the surrounding area when cavalry from Elbing arrived. Many of the Prussian infantry perished while cavalry escaped. Despite these losses, Diwane was soon back and blocked roads leading to Christburg hoping to starve the castle. Diwane was killed during a siege of a small post at Schönsee (Wąbrzeźno) in 1273.

In the winter of 1271–1272 reinforcements arrived from Meissen, led by Count Dietrich II. The army invaded Natangia and besieged an unnamed Natangian castle. While the assault claimed 150 lives of the crusaders, most of Natangian resistance was broken and the region was decimated. Herkus Monte, with a small group of his followers, was forced to withdraw to the forests of southern Prussia. Within a year he was captured and hanged. The last Prussian leader, Glappe of Warmians, was hanged when his siege campaign on Brandenburg (now Ushakovo) was attacked from the rear. The last tribe standing were the Pogesanians, who made a surprise raid into Elbing and ambushed its garrison. In 1274 the Knights made a great expedition to avenge this raid, capturing the rebel headquarters at Heilsberg (Lidzbark Warmiński) and ending the uprising.

The Knights proceeded to rebuild and strengthen castles destroyed by the Prussians. A number of Prussians escaped either to Sudovia or to Lithuania, or were resettled by the Knights. Many free peasants were made into serfs. Local nobles had to convert and give hostages, and only a few of them were granted privileges to retain their noble status. From 1274 to 1283 the Teutonic Knights conquered Skalvians, Nadruvians, and Sudovians/Yotvingians.

== Further uprisings and aftermath ==
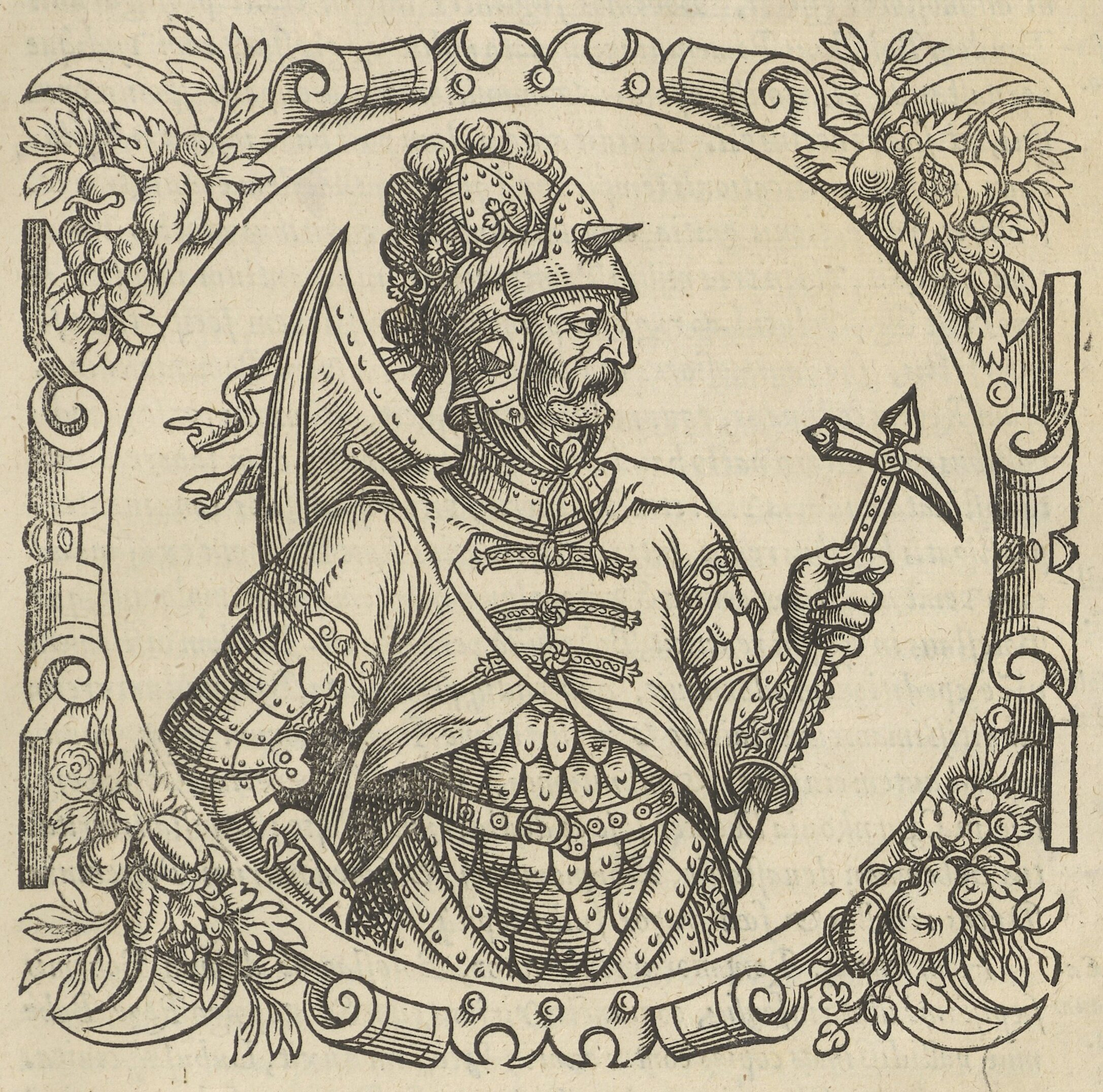
Grand Duke Vytenis, who the Prussians hoped would help defeat the Teutonic Knights in 1295

After the Great Uprising, the Prussians rose a number of times against the Knights, but these uprisings were much smaller in scale and posed no real danger to the Teutonic Knights, who could concentrate on further conquests. The number of uprisings is variously considered to be two or three. They were suppressed within a year or two and showed exhaustion and division of the Prussian tribes. The third uprising in 1276 was provoked by Skomantas, leader of the Sudovians, who successfully raided Teutonic lands. The next year he, with help from the Lithuanians, led 4,000 men into the Culmerland (Chełmno Land). The uprising failed to spread after Theodoric, vogt of Sambia, convinced the Sambians not to join the insurrection; Natangians and Warmians had also accepted baptism and promised their loyalty to the Knights. The Pogesanians alone continued the fight and were crushed. Survivors with their Bartian chief escaped to Hrodna in the Grand Duchy of Lithuania where they joined some of the Bartians, Skalvians, and all of the Nadruvians, who fled there after the Great Uprising.

The last two Prussian attempts to rid itself of the Teutonic rule were made relying on the foreign powers who were enemies of the Knights. The first one in 1286, also known as the fourth uprising, depended upon help from the Duke of Rügen, the grandson of Swantopolk. The plot was soon revealed and the Bartians and Pogesanians suffered the consequences. In 1295 the last uprising was limited to Natangia and Sambia and depended upon help from Vytenis, Grand Duke of Lithuania. The rebels captured Bartenstein (Bartoszyce) by surprise and plundered as far as Königsberg, but were never a serious threat. By that time Prussian nobility was already baptized and pro-Teutonic to the extent that peasants killed them first before attacking the Knights.

This last attempt effectively ended the Prussian Crusade and the Knights concentrated on conquering Samogitia and Lithuania. Lithuanian historians note that fierce resistance by the Prussians won time for the young Lithuanian state to mature and strengthen so it could withstand the hundred-year crusade, culminating in the 1410 Battle of Grunwald, with minimal territorial losses. The Prussian lands were repopulated by colonists from Germany, who after the 16th century eventually outnumbered the natives. It is estimated that around 1400 Prussians numbered 100,000 and comprised about half of the total population in Prussia. The Prussians were subject to Germanization and assimilation and eventually became extinct sometime after the 16th century. It is believed that the Prussian language became extinct sometime at the beginning of the 18th century.

== See also ==
- Northern Crusades
- Prussia (region)
