= Northern Crusades (film) =

1972 historical drama film

- Directed by: Marijonas Giedrys
- Written by: Saulius Šaltenis
- Starring: Antanas Šurna; Eugenija Pleškytė
- Cinematography: Jonas Tomaševičius
- Music by: Giedrius Kuprevičius
- Release date: December 14, 1972
- Running time: 145 minutes
- Country: Soviet Union
- Languages: Lithuanian, Russian

Northern Crusades (Lithuanian: Herkus Mantas) is a 1972 Lithuanian SSR historical drama film directed by Marijonas Giedrys.

== Cast ==
- Antanas Šurna – Herkus Monte (Herkus Mantas)
- Eugenija Pleškytė – Catherine (Kotryna)
- Algimantas Masiulis – Samilis
- Stasys Petronaitis – Koltis
- Pranas Piaulokas – Auctume (Auktuma)
- Algimantas Voščikas – Glappo (Glapas)
- Aleksandr Vokach – Knight Hirhalsas, brother of Catherine
- Vytautas Paukštė – Bishop (vyskupas)
