= Bartians (disambiguation) =

Bartians may refer:

- Bartians, an extinct Prussian tribe
- Inhabitants of Saint Barthélemy
- Inhabitants of Bartlesville, Oklahoma
