= Battle of Lubawa =

Coordinates: 53°30′00″N 19°45′00″E

- Part of the Great Prussian Uprising
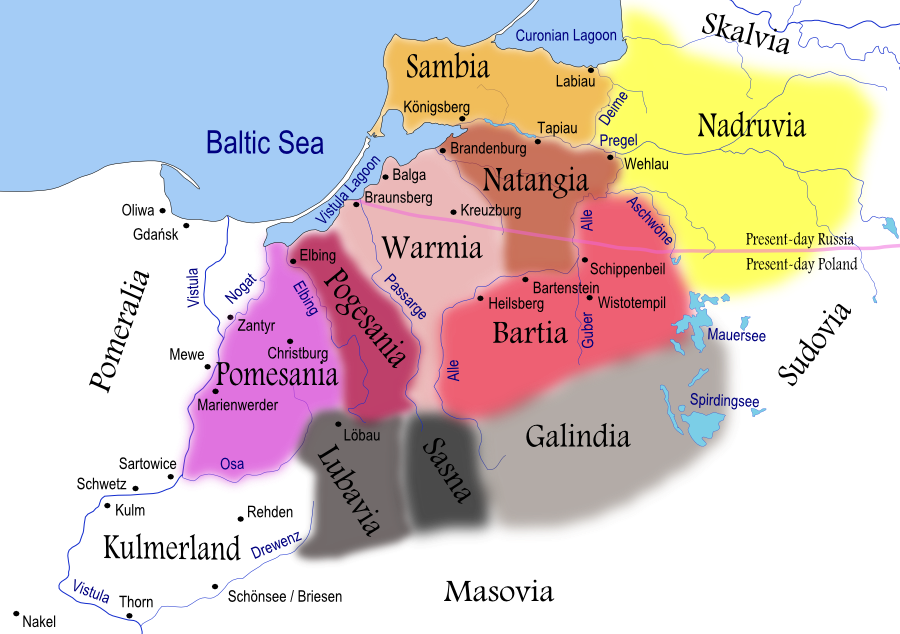
- Prussian tribes in the 13th century
| Date | 1263 |
| Location | Near Lubawa |
| Result | Prussian victory |

Belligerents
| Prussians (Natangians) | Teutonic Knights |

Commanders and leaders
| Herkus Monte | Master Helmrich von Rechenberg † |

Casualties and losses
| Unknown | 40 knights killed |

Battle of Lubawa or Löbau was fought between the Teutonic Order and Prussians in 1263 during the Great Prussian Uprising. The pagan Prussians rose against their conquerors, who tried to convert them to Christianity, after Lithuanians and Samogitians soundly defeated the joint forces of the Teutonic Knights and the Livonian Order in the Battle of Durbe (1260). The first years of the uprising were successful for the Prussians, who defeated the Knights in the Battle of Pokarwis and besieged castles held by the Knights.

The Prussians launched raids against the Chełmno Land (Kumerland), where the Knights first established themselves in the late 1220s. The apparent aim of these raids were to force the Knights to devote as many troops in defense of Chełmno as possible so that they could not provide help to the besieged castles and forts. In 1263 the Natangians led by Herkus Monte raided Chełmno Land and took many prisoners. Master Helmrich von Rechenberg, who was at Chełmno at the time, collected his men and pursued the Natangians, who could not move quickly due to a large number of captives.

The Teutonic Knights intercepted the Prussians near Löbau (now Lubawa, Poland). Their heavy warhorses smashed the Natangian formation, but Herkus Monte with trusted warriors attacked and killed the master Helmrich and marshal Dietrich. Leaderless knights were defeated, and forty knights perished along with a number of low-ranking soldiers. In terms of killed knights, it was the sixth largest defeat of the Teutonic Knights in the 13th century. After the battle it looked like the Prussians might win the uprising, but because of their infighting between numerous clans, they did not seize the opportunity to strike the final devastating blow. Instead individual clans continued to act on their own.
