= Balga =

Medieval castle of the Teutonic Knights in Kaliningrad Oblast, Russia

Coordinates: 54°33′09″N 19°58′10″E

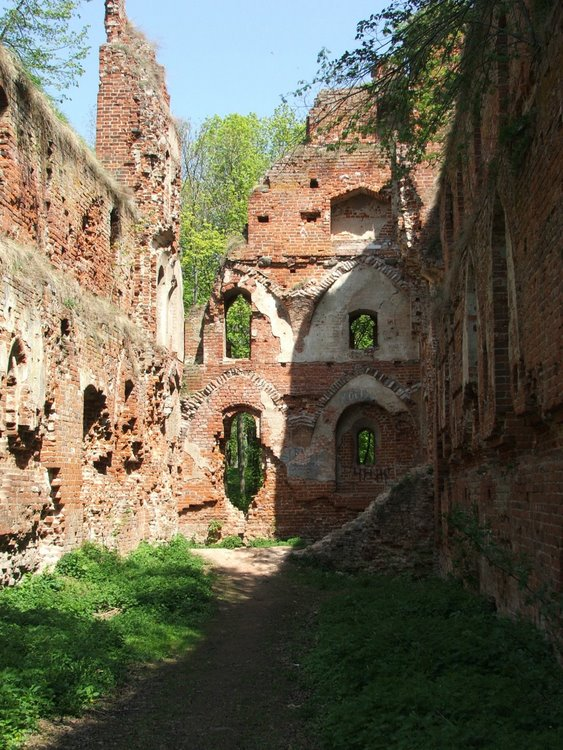
Balga castle ruins in 2006

Balga (Russian: замок Бальга; German: Burg Balga; Lithuanian: Balga; Polish: Balga) was a medieval castle of the Teutonic Knights in Kaliningrad Oblast, Russia. The castle ruins are located on the shore of the Vistula Lagoon, north of Mamonovo in the Pogranichny municipality of Bagrationovsky District, about 30 km (19 mi) southwest of Kaliningrad.

== History ==
The hill of Balga had been the site of an Old Prussian (Warmian) fortress called Honeda. The fort had been unsuccessfully besieged by the Wettin margrave Henry III of Meissen on his 1237 Prussian Crusade, but was eventually conquered in 1239 by the forces of the Teutonic Order, led by Grand Marshal Dietrich von Bernheim. Balga was the oldest Ordensburg constructed by the Teutonic Order in the region of present-day Kaliningrad Oblast, and was built from 1239 to control naval traffic on the Vistula Lagoon. With the assistance of Duke Otto I of Brunswick-Lüneburg, the Teutonic Knights defeated the Old Prussians along the coastline of Warmia and Natangia. The subjugation of these pagan peoples led Duke Świętopełk II of Pomerania to declare war against the Teutonic Order during the 1242 Prussian uprising, although he was eventually forced to abandon his participation in the uprising. From 1250, Balga was the administrative centre of Kommende Balga and the seat of a Komtur of the Teutonic Knights. Many Komturs at Balga like Winrich von Kniprode or Ulrich von Jungingen later rose to the office of the Grand Master, the highest position in the Teutonic Order.

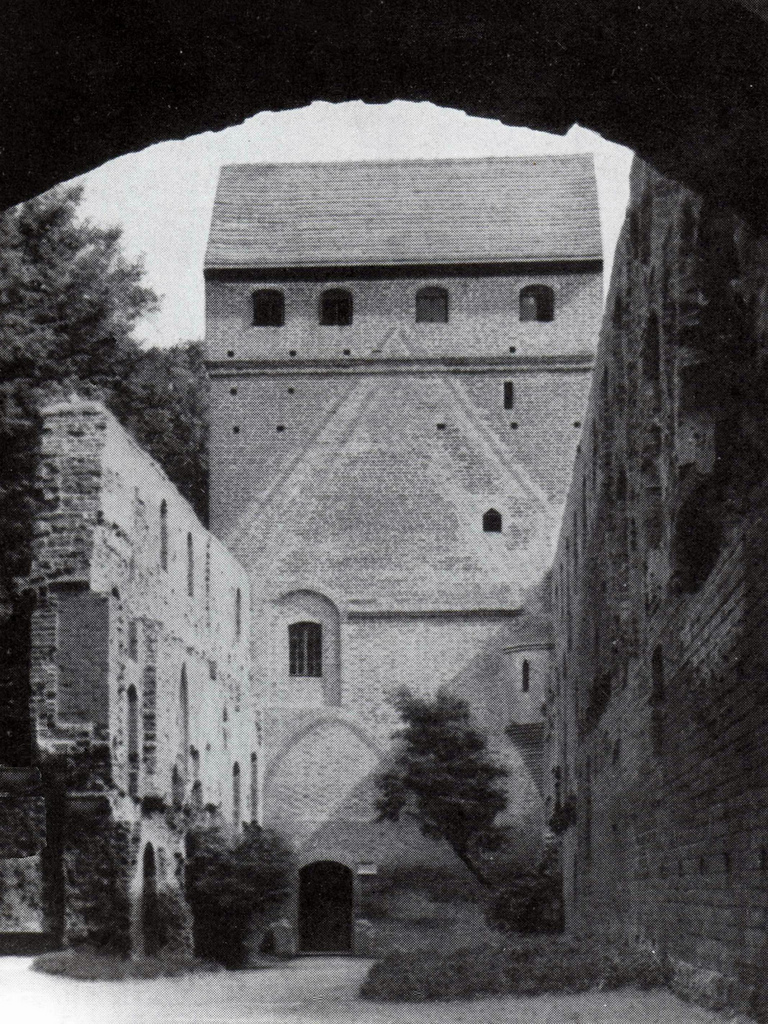
Balga ruins in their 1930s condition, before damage during World War II

In 1499, Grand Master Friedrich von Sachsen had the Kommende dissolved, and upon the Prussian Homage, Balga was part of the Polish Duchy of Prussia in 1525, and the castle became the residence of George of Polentz, Bishop of Samland.

From 1627, parts of the castle were broken down at the behest of King Gustavus Adolphus of Sweden during the Polish–Swedish War in order to gain building material for the construction of the star fort in Pillau (now Baltiysk), a strategically important port town occupied by the Swedes. Balga was located in the Duchy of Prussia from 1525 and the Kingdom of Prussia from 1701, where between 1772 and 1829 it belonged to the province of East Prussia. The province was unified with West Prussia into the Province of Prussia until 1878, when it separated once again and Balga remained in East Prussia until 1945.

During World War II the castle ruins were the site of one of the final battles between the German Wehrmacht and the Soviet Red Army, with the latter advancing during the East Prussian Offensive. The German defenders destroyed numerous vehicles by sinking them in the lagoon next to the ruins, and the battle extensively damaged the castle remains. Following the war Balga was in the section of East Prussia allocated to the Soviet Union at the Potsdam Conference, and included in the area that was organized into Kaliningrad Oblast of the Russian SFSR. The area around Balga became a popular site for grave robbers and treasure hunters hoping to dig up valuables left behind by the castle's previous occupants and the German and Soviet soldiers who died in World War II.

Balga was also the name of a nearby village, which after Soviet sovereignty over the area was renamed Vesyoloye. It is now abandoned.

== See also ==
- List of castles in Russia
