= Nadruvians =

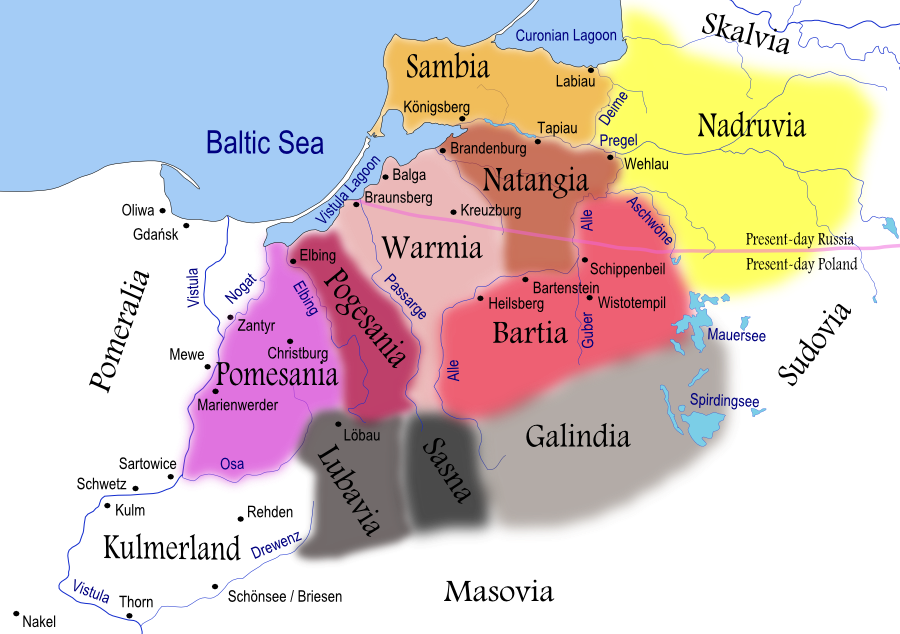
- Nadruvians (in yellow) and other Prussian clans during the 13th century

Total population
- Extinct in 17th-18th century

Regions with significant populations

Languages
- Old Prussian, later also Lithuanian and German

Religion
- Prussian mythology (Paganism)

Related ethnic groups
- Other Prussians and Balts

The Nadruvians were an Old Prussian tribe. Now extinct, they lived in Nadruvia (alternative spellings include: Nadruva, Nadrowite, Nadrovia, Nadrauen, Nadravia, Nadrow and Nadra), a large territory in northernmost Prussia. They bordered the Skalvians on the Neman (Nemunas) River just to the north, the Sudovians to the east, and other Prussian tribes to the south and west. Most information about the clan is provided in a chronicle by Peter von Dusburg.

== History ==
In 1236 Peter of Dusburg wrote that Nadruvia was the location of Romuva, the sacred center of Baltic religion. From Romuva Kriwe, the chief priest or "pagan Pope", ruled over the religion of all the Balts. No other sources mention the place. Scientists have considerable doubts if such an organized structure existed.

As the northernmost clan, Nadruvians were conquered last by the Teutonic Knights, a German crusading military order. In 1230 the Knights set up their base in the Chełmno Land in Poland and proceeded to conquer all pagans and convert them to Christianity. The first military encounters between Nadruvians and the Knights began ca. 1255 when the Knights were trying to conquer Sambians, western neighbors of Nadruvians. Dusburg alleges that Nadruvians had several fortresses with strong garrisons. Two distorted names are given (Otholicia and Cameniswika) and it is very difficult to identify their location. Nadruvians built another castle at Velowe when the Knights reached their lands. Sambians had to surrender in 1277, but the conquest of Nadruvians was delayed by the Great Prussian Uprising that broke out in 1260. The uprising ended in 1274, and Nadruvians fell in 1275. Prussian fortress at Velowe was captured by the Teutonic Knights and renamed to Wehlau. A handful of Nadruvians retreated into Grand Duchy of Lithuania. The rest were incorporated into the Monastic state of the Teutonic Knights and merged with Lithuanian and German settlers. In 1454, the region was incorporated by King Casimir IV Jagiellon to the Kingdom of Poland. After the subsequent Thirteen Years' War, the longest of all Polish–Teutonic wars, since 1466, it formed part of Poland as a fief held by the Teutonic Order, and after 1525 held by secular Ducal Prussia. Eventually, sometime after the 16th century, Nadruvians became extinct. The bulk of Nadruvia became part of the predominantly Lithuanian-inhabited region of Lithuania Minor.

== Etymology and classification ==
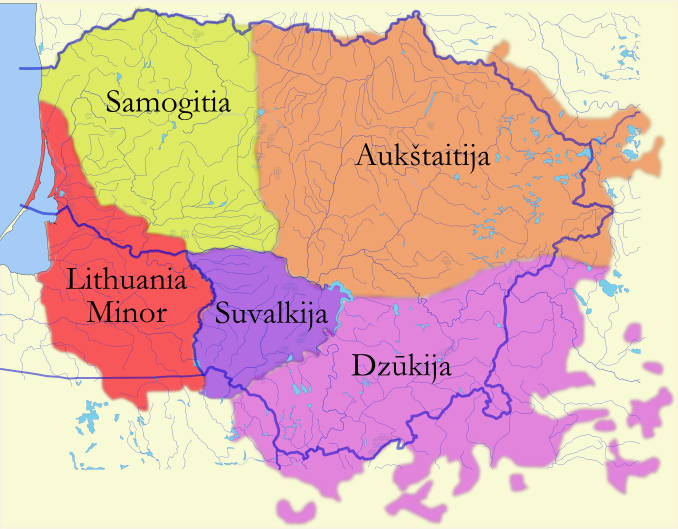
The territory of the Nadruvians is largely coterminous with Lithuania Minor, one of the historical ethnographic regions of Lithuania.

Linguists offer a few derivations for the name of the clan:

- Kazimieras Būga reconstructs *Nadravo from Old Prussian na (on) and dravis (wood).
- Kazys Kuzavinis and Zigmas Zinkevičius argue for na and some reflex of Indo-European *dhreu- (flow), as in English drizzle.
- Vilius Pėteraitis suggested that the name is derived from Drava, one of the tributaries to Pregolya, which name did not survive to this day.
- Like for other Old Prussian tribes, folk etymology states that Nadruvia was named after Nadro, a son of Prussian chieftain Widewuto.

While most linguists agree that Nadruvians were one of the Prussian clans, some historians argue that they were a separate tribe, more closely related to western Lithuanians than to Prussians. The matter is further complicated by the fact that the area was largely depopulated by the crusades against Prussians and Lithuanians. It was repopulated by bringing colonists from Germany and Lithuania (see Lithuania Minor). Therefore, it is impossible to determine whether Lithuanians originally lived there or migrated later on.

Another variant of the name is Netherland what corresponds to the Lithuanian suffix -uva meaning land as also in Lietuva - Lithuania and German Letland - Latvia. The root nether corresponds to Lithuanian Žemaitija - Samogitia, which translates as Lowland and was a neighbouring land of Nadrovia.
