= Battle of Pokarwis =

Coordinates: 54°36′N 20°14′E

- Part of the Great Prussian Uprising
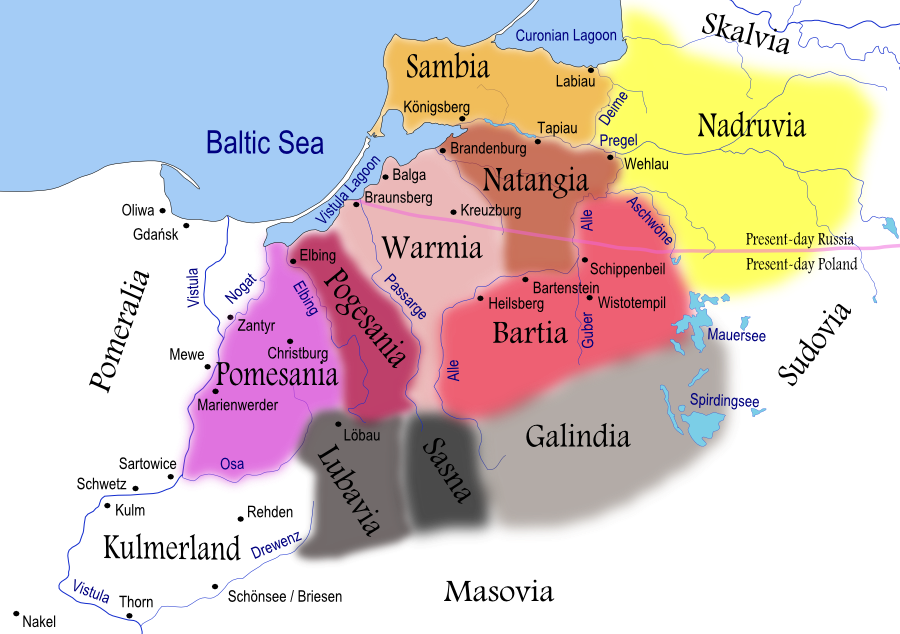
- Prussian tribes in the 13th century
Date	January 22, 1261
Location	Near present day Ushakovo
Result	Prussian victory

Belligerents
Prussians (Natangians)	Teutonic Knights

Commanders and leaders
Herkus Monte	Count of Reyden

The Battle of Pokarwis was a medieval battle fought in several skirmishes between pagan Old Prussians and the crusading Teutonic Knights on January 22, 1261 during the Great Prussian Uprising that followed the failed first Prussian Uprising of 1242-1249.

After Lithuanians and Samogitians soundly defeated the joint forces of the Teutonic Knights and the Livonian Order in the Battle of Durbe in 1260, the Prussians rose against their conquerors once again. Prussian tribes agreed to cooperate and elected their leaders. The Great Prussian Uprising started on September 20, 1260.

The Teutonic Order called crusaders from Germany and Poland for help and the first large army of reinforcements arrived in January 1261. The army was split into two groups: one, led by the Count of Barby, to operate in Sambia and the other, under the leadership of the Count of Reyden, to operate in Natangia.

The Teutonic group in Natangia met little resistance and split into two groups so that they could cover a larger territory more effectively. Though a common practice, it was a tactical mistake, because Herkus Monte, the leader of the Natangians, had been educated in Germany and expected this development. As soon as one group departed, he attacked and defeated the other. The first group had to retreat. The very next day the Teutonic group dispatched to Sambia was also defeated. This way the first wave of Teutonic reinforcements was wiped out and the Knights were in distress. The uprising spread further and intensified.
