= Warmians =

Historical ethnical group

- Location of Old Prussian Warmia on the map of Poland and Russia

Total population
- Extinct in 17th-18th century

Regions with significant populations

Languages
- Old Prussian, later also Polish and German

Religion
- Prussian mythology (Paganism)

Related ethnic groups
- Other Prussians and Balts

Warmians (also Warmi) were a Prussian tribe that lived in Warmia (Polish: Warmia, Latin: Varmia, German: Ermland, Lithuanian: Varmė), a territory which now mostly forms part of the Warmian-Masurian Voivodeship in Poland, with a small northern portion located in neighbouring Russia. It was situated between the Vistula Lagoon, Łyna and Pasłęka Rivers.

The Warmians, along with the other Prussians, were conquered by the Teutonic Knights, a crusading military order under direct command of the pope. The Knights conquered the Prussians and converted them to Christianity. Many cities and towns were built and the population increased by bringing in colonists from Germany and Poland, as well as other countries of Europe. The Prussians were eventually assimilated by the colonists and the Old Prussian language became extinct by the end of the 17th century or beginning of the 18th century.

== History ==
Soon after the Christianization of Poland, centuries of Polish attempts at conquest of the native Prussians began in 997 AD. The preferred method was to try to convert the still heathen Prussians to Christianity, and thereby also acquire their land. A number of crusades followed, called by Konrad of Masovia, as well as attacks on Prussian land of the Yotvingians, which later became Polish Podlasie, and of the Sudovians and Galindians. To speed up and enforce this pressure on Prussians, Duke Konrad, who had already called for crusade in 1209, then called in the Teutonic Order.

After arriving to Chełmno Land in 1230, the Teutonic Knights proceeded to conquer the pagan Prussians and convert them to Christianity. The Warmians, together with the Bartians and the Natangians, were conquered between 1238 and 1241. During one of the first Teutonic raids into Warmia, the Knights destroyed Honeda, a Warmian castle, and built Balga, their own brick fortress. Using their tested tactics, the Knights used Balga as a base for further expansion. The stronghold was one of five castles that did not fall during the First Prussian Uprising which broke out in 1242 and ended in 1249 with the signing of the Treaty of Christburg. The Knights also built the Braunsberg (Braniewo) and Heilsberg (Lidzbark Warmiński) castles.

After a crushing defeat of the Teutonic Knights in the Battle of Durbe in 1260, the Prussians rebelled again. The Great Prussian Uprising lasted for fourteen years. Warmians appointed Glappo as their leader and joined the uprising. During the early stage of the uprising, Glappo and his men successfully captured Braunsberg, but failed to capture Balga. In 1266, the rulers of Brandenburg arrived in Prussia and built a castle on the border of Warmian and Natangian lands between Balga and Königsberg. Named Brandenburg (now Ushakovo), the castle withstood Prussian attacks. Glappo was captured and hanged when he tried to recapture the fortress in 1273. The uprising ended a year later, and it was the last time the Warmians rebelled. Afterwards they were slowly assimilated by the Germans and Poles. In 1454, the region was incorporated by King Casimir IV Jagiellon to the Kingdom of Poland, with the cities and nobility of Warmia siding with Poland, and the Prince-Bishops of Warmia following suit in 1464. Poles settled in greater numbers after the Second Peace of Thorn (1466), in which the Teutonic Knights renounced any claims to the Prince-Bishopric of Warmia, and recognized it as part of Poland.

== Etymology ==
Several theories exist about the origin of the word Warmia:

- It might be derived from Prussian word wormyan (English: red);
- It might stem from Lithuanian word varmas (English: mosquito). In such a case it might have cultic background as worms are associated with fertility;
- Folk etymology has it that Warmia is named after the legendary Prussian chief Warmo. Ermland, name used by Germans, is said to derive from his widow Erma.
