= Slavskoye, Russia =

Settlement in Kaliningrad Oblast, Russia

Slavskoye Сла́вское
- Rural locality
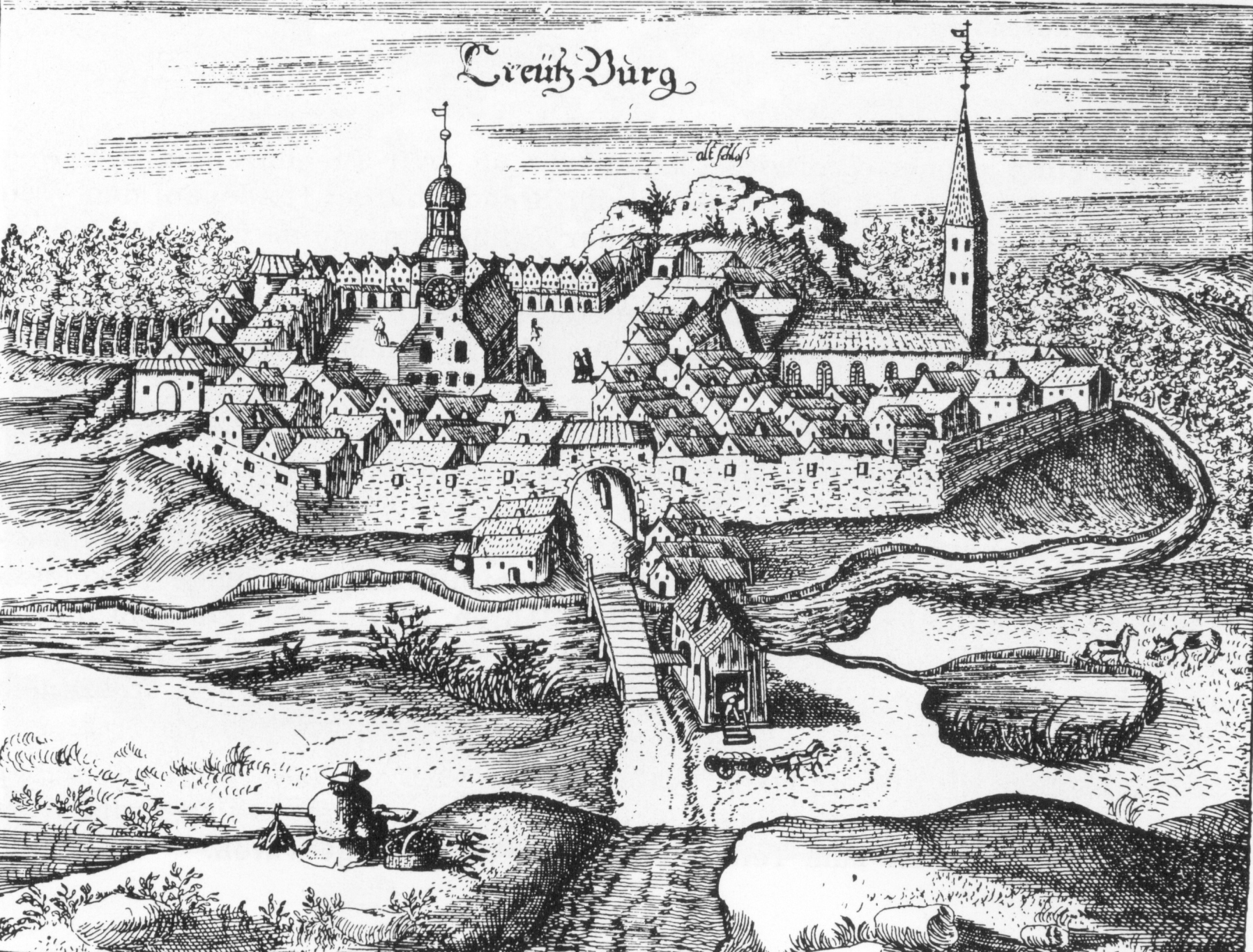
- A 1684 depiction of the town
- Interactive map of Slavskoye
- Location of Slavskoye Slavskoye (European Russia) Slavskoye (Russia)
- Coordinates: 54°30′N 20°26′E
- Country: Russia
- Federal subject: Kaliningrad Oblast
- Administrative district: Bagrationovsky District
- Founded: 1240 (Julian)
- Elevation: 47 m (154 ft)

Population (2010 Census)
  - Total: 248
  - Estimate (2010): 248 (0%)
- Time zone: UTC+2 (MSK–1)
- Postal code: 238420
- OKTMO ID: 27703000336

Slavskoye (Russian: Сла́вское; German: Kreuzburg in Ostpreußen; Polish: Krzyżbork; Lithuanian: Kryžbarkas) is a settlement in the Bagrationovsky District, Kaliningrad Oblast, Russia, located 20 kilometers (12 mi) south of Kaliningrad.

== History ==
In 1240, the Teutonic Knights founded a castle (Creutzburg or Kreuzburg, meaning 'cross castle') in the region of Natangia at the location of an Old Prussian settlement. In 1315 Kreuzburg received its town privileges. Throughout the Hunger War in 1414, 71 houses were destroyed and five citizens were killed by the Polish troops. In 1440 the town joined the Prussian Confederation, at the request of which Polish King Casimir IV Jagiellon signed the act of incorporation of the region into the Kingdom of Poland in 1454. During the subsequent Thirteen Years' War the town suffered heavy damages, and after the war, per the peace treaty signed in Toruń in 1466, the Teutonic Order regained authority over the town as a fief of the Polish Crown. The town suffered damages in the Polish-Teutonic War of 1519–1521, which broke out after the Grand Master of the Teutonic Order refused to pledge allegiance to Poland. The war resulted in the secularization of the Teutonic Knights in 1525, and the establishment of the Duchy of Prussia, which remained a fief of Poland.

In 1701, the town became part of the Kingdom of Prussia. It was badly affected by the Napoleonic Battle of Eylau in February 1807 and almost totally destroyed by a fire catastrophe on May 10, 1818, when 152 buildings burned down. Only the church, the vicarage, and the schoolhouse were not affected. Due to that disaster the regional administration was transferred to Preußisch Eylau. In 1871, the town became part of Germany.

Kreuzburg was connected to the railway system in 1908.

Throughout the Soviet East Prussian Offensive in February 1945 Kreuzburg was again largely destroyed and transferred from Germany to the Soviet Union according to the 1945 Potsdam Conference. Its German population was expelled, and the name was changed from Kreuzburg to Slavskoye.

== Population ==
- 1740: 986
- 1816: 1,700
- 1823: 1,352
- 1843: 1,809
- 1875: 2,004
- 1885: 1,976, including 17 Catholics, 11 Jews
- 1910: 1,726
- 1939: 2,005

== Notable residents ==
- Hermann von Boyen (1771–1848), Prussian fieldmarshal
- Michael Kongehl (1646–1710), baroque poet
- Michel Tolkien (1620-?), earliest known paternal ancestor of J. R. R. Tolkien, the English author

== Bibliography ==
- Horst Schulz, Der Kreis Pr. Eylau, Verden/Aller 1983
