= Bartians =

- Location of Bartia on the map of Poland

Total population
- Extinct in the 17–18th century

Regions with significant populations

Languages
- Old Prussian, later also German

Religion
- Prussian mythology (Paganism)

Related ethnic groups
- Other Prussians and Balts

The Bartians (also Barthi, Barthoni, Bartens, or Barti) were an Old Prussian tribe who were among the last natives following a pre-Christian religion before the Northern Crusades forced their conversion to Christianity at the cost of a high percentage of the native population. They lived in Bartia (also Bartenland or Barthonia), a territory that stretched from the middle and lower flow of Łyna river, by the Liwna river, and Lake Mamry, up to the Galindian woods. The territory is quite precisely known from description in Chronicon terrae Prussiae, dated 1326.

The same description mentions two provinces, the Major Barta and the Minor Barta. The territory was quite densely populated, as confirmed by abundant archeological findings. Before the wars with the Teutonic Knights, the population was estimated to be at 17,000.

The Bartians, along with the other Prussians, were conquered by the Teutonic Knights, who Christianized them under duress, brought in settlers. The Prussians were forcibly assimilated by the invaders and the Old Prussian language became extinct by the end of the 17th century.

== History ==
Several years of conquest attempts by Poland, aided by a number of crusades by the popes and by Konrad of Masovia, had been fairly successfully repelled by the Prussians. Then Konrad of Masovia called for further crusades and invited the Teutonic Knights, an Order of the Catholic Church, to settle in Chełmno Land in 1226. Receiving support from the rest of Christian Europe, the military order was able to expand their territory northeast. Their strategy was to conquer a territory and built a castle — a stronghold that would serve as the basis for further expansion. Castles at that time in Europe were built to serve as bases for colonial expansion.

The Bartians, together with the Warmians and the Natangians, were conquered by the Teutonic Knights 1238–1240. In Bartia the Knights built major castles in Bartoszyce and Reszel. In 1242, just two years after their conquest, Bartians rebelled and managed to resist until 1252. During the Great Prussian Uprising (1260–1274), that started after the Knights suffered a major loss in the Battle of Durbe, Bartians chose Diwane as their leader. The rebels managed to capture a few castles, including Bartenstein (Bartoszyce) in 1264. With help from other Prussian tribes, Diwane attacked Kulm (Chełmno), Marienburg (Malbork), and Christburg (Dzierzgoń). However, the Prussians could not win a war of attrition against the Knights, who could draw resources from the western Europe. In 1273 Diwane sieged another castle but was fatally wounded. Within a year, the uprising was over. Some of the rebels escaped to Grodno and other Lithuanian territories.

Despite heavy losses during the uprising, Bartia did not become an uninhabited land and the Bartians continued to resist. Two more attempts were made, in 1286 and 1293, to fight against the Teutonic Knights. In 1286 Bartians asked help from Duke of Rügen, and in 1293 from Vytenis, Grand Duke of Lithuania. In 1454, the region was incorporated by King Casimir IV Jagiellon to the Kingdom of Poland. After the subsequent Thirteen Years' War, the longest of all Polish–Teutonic wars, since 1466, it formed part of Poland as a fief held by the Teutonic Order, and after 1525 held by secular Ducal Prussia. The Bartians were forcibly assimilated by the Germans in the 16th or 17th century.

They are most likely the Bartove mentioned in the Hypatian Codex (together with the Prussians: "Prousi i Bartove").
