= Old Prussians =

Historical Baltic tribal group

Prussians Prūsai
- The Old Prussians' territory in light green c. 1200 CE (the boundaries are approximations)

Old Prussians, Baltic Prussians or simply Prussians (Note: Prussian: prūsai; German: Pruzzen or Prußen; Latin: Pruteni; Latvian: prūši; Lithuanian: prūsai; Polish: Prusowie; Kashubian: Prësowié) were a Baltic people that inhabited the region of Prussia, on the southeastern shore of the Baltic Sea between the Vistula Lagoon to the west and the Curonian Lagoon to the east. As Balts, they spoke an Indo-European language of the Baltic branch now known as Old Prussian and worshipped pre-Christian deities. Their ethnonym was later adopted by predominantly Low German-speaking inhabitants of the region.

The duchy of the Polans under Mieszko I, which was the predecessor of the Kingdom of Poland, first attempted to conquer and baptize the Baltic tribes during the 10th century, but repeatedly encountered strong resistance. Not until the 13th century were the Old Prussians subjugated and their lands conquered by the Teutonic Order. The remaining Old Prussians were assimilated during the following two centuries. The Old Prussian language, documented only in a limited way, was effectively extinct by the 18th century.

The original territory of the Old Prussians prior to the first clashes with the Polans consisted of central and southern West and East Prussia, equivalent to parts of the modern areas of the Pomeranian Voivodeship and Warmian-Masurian Voivodeship in Poland, the Kaliningrad Oblast in Russia and the southern Klaipėda Region in Lithuania. The territory was also inhabited by Scalovians, a tribe related to the Prussians, Curonians and Eastern Balts.

== Etymology ==
The term Prussian is an exonym for these peoples; they did not refer to themselves with this word. The words Prussians and Prussia may originate from toponymy, as the word Prūsas ("a Prussian") can be derived from the term for a body of water, an understandable convention in a coastal region dotted with thousands of lakes, streams, and swamps (Masuria). To the south, the terrain runs into the vast wetlands of the Pripet Marshes at the headwaters of the Dnieper River, which has been an effective natural barrier throughout the millennia.

Writing in 98 CE, Roman historian Tacitus described the pagan Aesti who lived somewhere by the Baltic Sea coast and east of the Vistula estuary. It has been suggested that the name Aesti could be etymologically related to the modern toponym Estonia. On the other hand, the Old Prussian and modern Lithuanian names for localities, such as the Vistula Lagoon, Aīstinmari and Aistmarės, respectively, also appear to derive from Aesti and mari ("lagoon" or "fresh-water bay"), which suggests that the area around the lagoon had links with the Aesti.

The original settlers tended to name their assets after surrounding localities (streams, lakes, seas, forests, etc.). The clan or tribal entity into which their descendants were later organized continued to use the names. This source is perhaps the one used in the very name of Prusa (Prussia), for which an earlier Latin-language word Bruzi is found in the Bavarian Geographer. (Note: Bruzi plus est undique quam de Enisa ad Rhenum) In Tacitus' Germania, the Lugii Buri are mentioned living within the eastern range of the Germans. Lugi may descend from Julius Pokorny's *leug- ("black swamp"), while Buri is perhaps the root on which the toponym Prussia is based.

The name of Pameddi, the (Pomesania) tribe, is derived from the words pa ("by" or "near") and median ("forest"), which can be traced to the Proto-Indo-European adjective *médʰyos ("middle"). (Note: The nominalization "the middle (one)" acquired, apparently via "what is in the middle (between fields, villages or cultivated land in general)", the meaning 'border, boundary; balk (between fields); forest' in Balto-Slavic.) Nadruvia may be a compound of the words na ("by" or "on") and drawē ("wood"). The name of the Bartians, a Prussian tribe, and the name of the Bārta river in Latvia are possibly cognates.

In the second century CE, the geographer Claudius Ptolemy listed some Borusci living in European Sarmatia (in his Eighth Map of Europe), which was separated from Germania by the Vistula Flumen. His map is very confusing in that region, but the Borusci seem further east than the Prussians, which would have been under the Gythones (Goths) at the mouth of the Vistula. The Aesti recorded by Tacitus, were 450 years later recorded by Jordanes as part of the Gothic Empire.

== Organisation ==
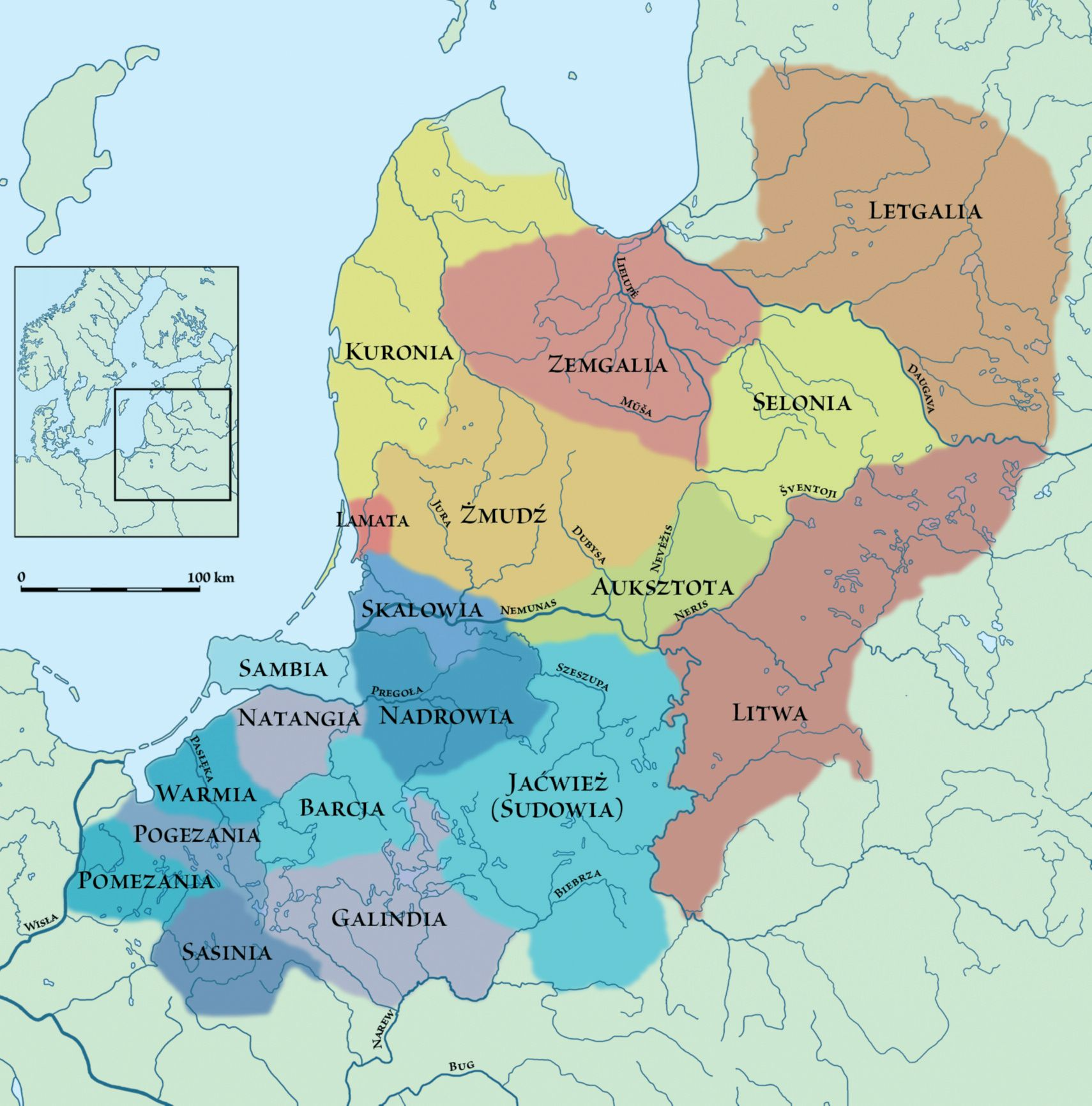
Prussian tribes and their borders around 1200.

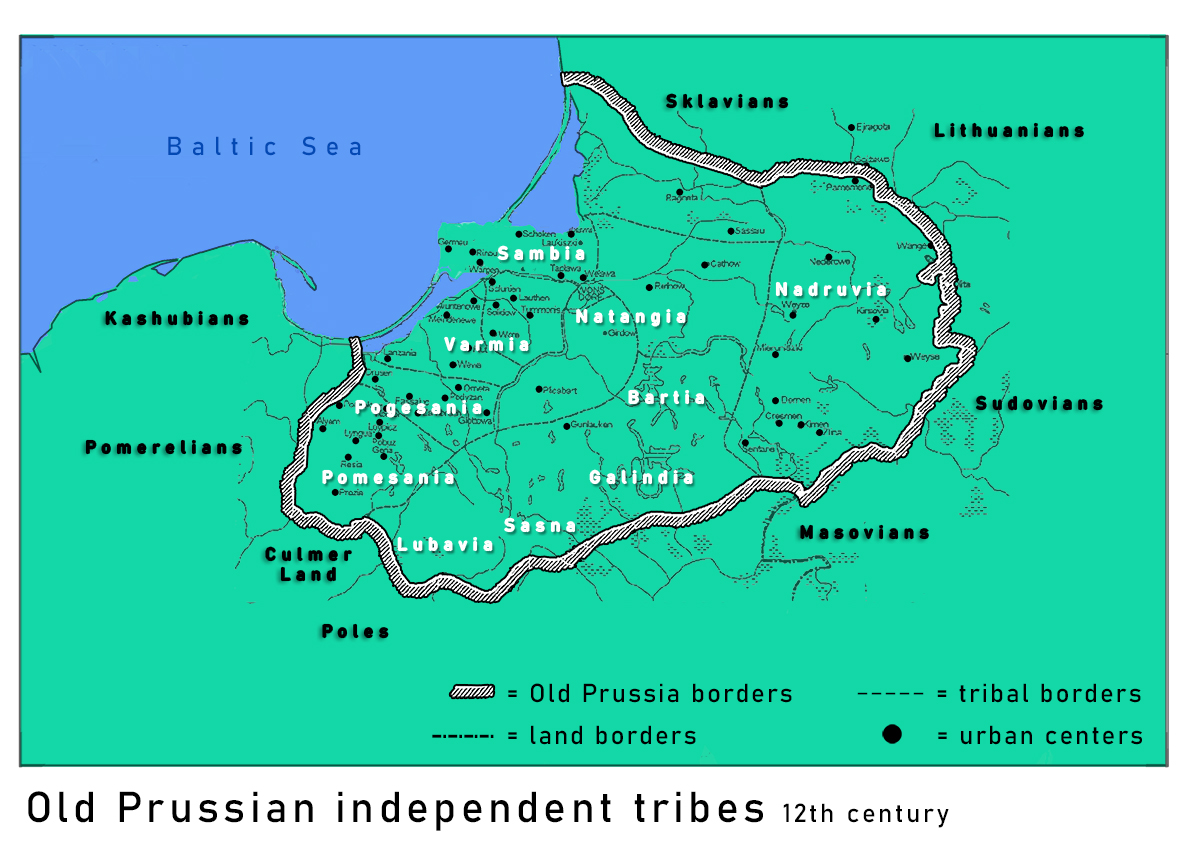
Political and tribal fragmentation of the 12th century Old Prussians

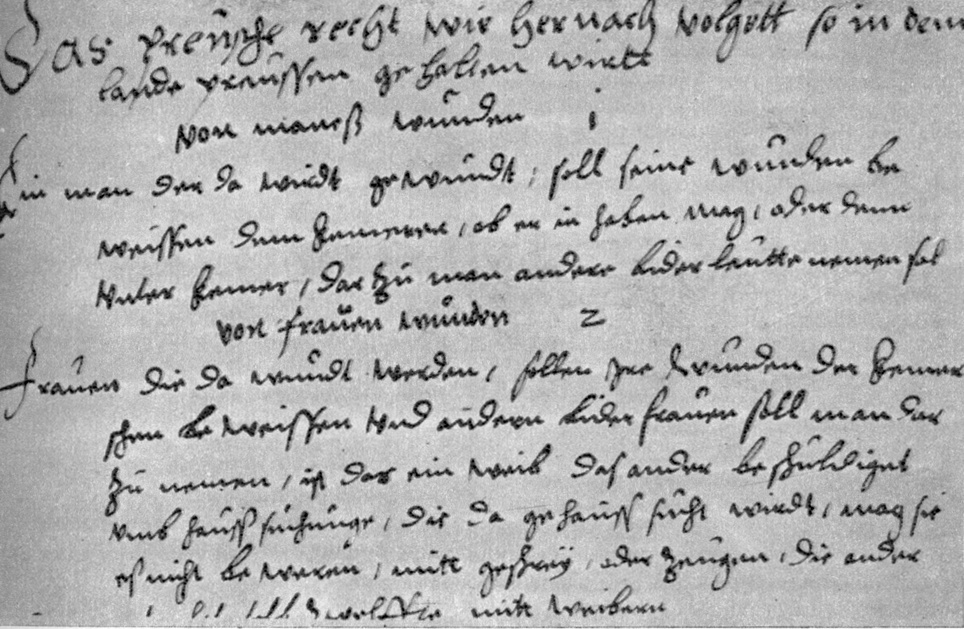
A fragment of the Pomesanian statute book of 1340. The earliest attested document of the customary law of the Balts.

The original Old Prussian settlement area in the western Baltic, as well as that of the eastern Balts, was much larger than in historical times. The archaeological documentation and associated finds confirm uninterrupted presence from the Iron Age (fifth century BCE) to the successive conquest by Slavic tribes, beginning in the Migration Period.

Permanent recorded Baltic history begins in the 10th century with the failed Christianisation by Adalbert of Prague (997 CE), the first conquest attempts at the expense of the Old Prussians by the duchy of the Polans under Mieszko I and the Duchy of Greater Poland under his son Bolesław, as a number of border areas were eventually lost.

Around the year 1000 CE, the Kashubians and Pomeranians lived to the west of the Old Prussians, the Poles to the south, the Sudovians (sometimes considered a separate people, other times regarded as a Prussian tribe) to the east and south-east, the Skalvians to the north, and the Lithuanians to the northeast.

The smallest social unit in the Baltic lands was the laūks, a word attested in Old Prussian as "field", which were small family oriented settlements, households and the surrounding fields, only separated from one another by uninhabited areas of forest, swamp and marsh. The word appears as a segment in Baltic settlement names, especially in Curonian, (Note: It varies in spellings, including -laukas, -laukis, and lauks.) and is found in Old Prussian placenames such as in Stablack, from stabs (stone) + laūks (field, thus stone field). The plural is not attested in Old Prussian, but the Lithuanian plural of laukas ("field") is laukai.

A laūks was also formed by a group of farms that shared economic interests and a desire for safety, ruled by a male head of the family and centred on strongholds or hill forts. The supreme power resided in general gatherings of all adult males, who discussed important matters concerning the community and elected the leader and chief; the leader was responsible for the supervision of the everyday matters, while the chief (the rikīs) was in charge of the road and watchtower building, and border defense, undertaken by Vidivarii.

The head of a household was the buttataws (literally, the house father, from buttan, meaning home, and taws, meaning father). Larger political and territorial organisations, called terrula in Latin (a small land), existed in the early 13th century in the territories which later comprised Prussia, Latvia and Lithuania and centred on strongholds or hill forts. Such a political territorial unit covered up to 300 km^{2} (120 sq mi) and could have up to 2,000 inhabitants. They were known as pulka, comprising a dozen or so laukses.

Because the Baltic tribes inhabiting Prussia never formed a common political and territorial organisation, they had no reason to adopt a common ethnic or national name. Instead, they used the name of the region from which they came – Galindians, Sambians, Bartians, Nadruvians, Natangians, Scalovians, Sudovians, etc. It is not known when and how the first general names came into being. This lack of unity weakened them severely, similar to the condition of Germany during the Middle Ages.

According to Jan Długosz, the Prussians, Samogitians, and Lithuanians were the same tribe.

The Prussian tribal structure is well attested in the Chronicon terrae Prussiae of contemporary author Peter of Dusburg, a chronicler of the Teutonic Order. The work is dated to 1326. He lists eleven lands and ten tribes, which were named on a geographical basis. These were:

	Latin	German	Polish	modern Lithuanian	reconstructed Prussian	see also
1	Pomesania	Pomesanien	Pomezania	Pamedė	Pameddi	Pomesanians
2	Varmia	Ermland, Warmien	Warmia	Varmė	Wārmi	Warmians
3	Pogesania	Pogesanien	Pogezania	Pagudė	Paguddi	Pogesanians
4	Natangia	Natangen	Natangia	Notanga	Notangi	Natangians
5	Sambia	Samland	Sambia	Semba	Semba	Sambians
6	Nadrovia	Nadrauen	Nadrowia	Nadruva	Nadrāuwa	Nadruvians
7	Bartia	Barten	Barcja	Barta	Barta	Bartians
8	Scalovia	Schalauen	Skalowia	Skalva	Skallawa	Skalvians
9	Sudovia	Sudauen	Sudawia	Sūduva	Sūdawa	Sudovians or Yotvingians
10	Galindia	Galindien	Galindia	Galinda	Galinda	Galindians
11	Culm	Kulmerland	Chełmno	Kulmas	Kulma, Kulms	

== Culture, religion and customs ==
"The Voyages of Ohthere and Wulfstan" describes a ninth century voyage by traveller and trader Wulfstan of Hedeby to the land of the Old Prussians. He observed their funeral customs.

=== Customs ===
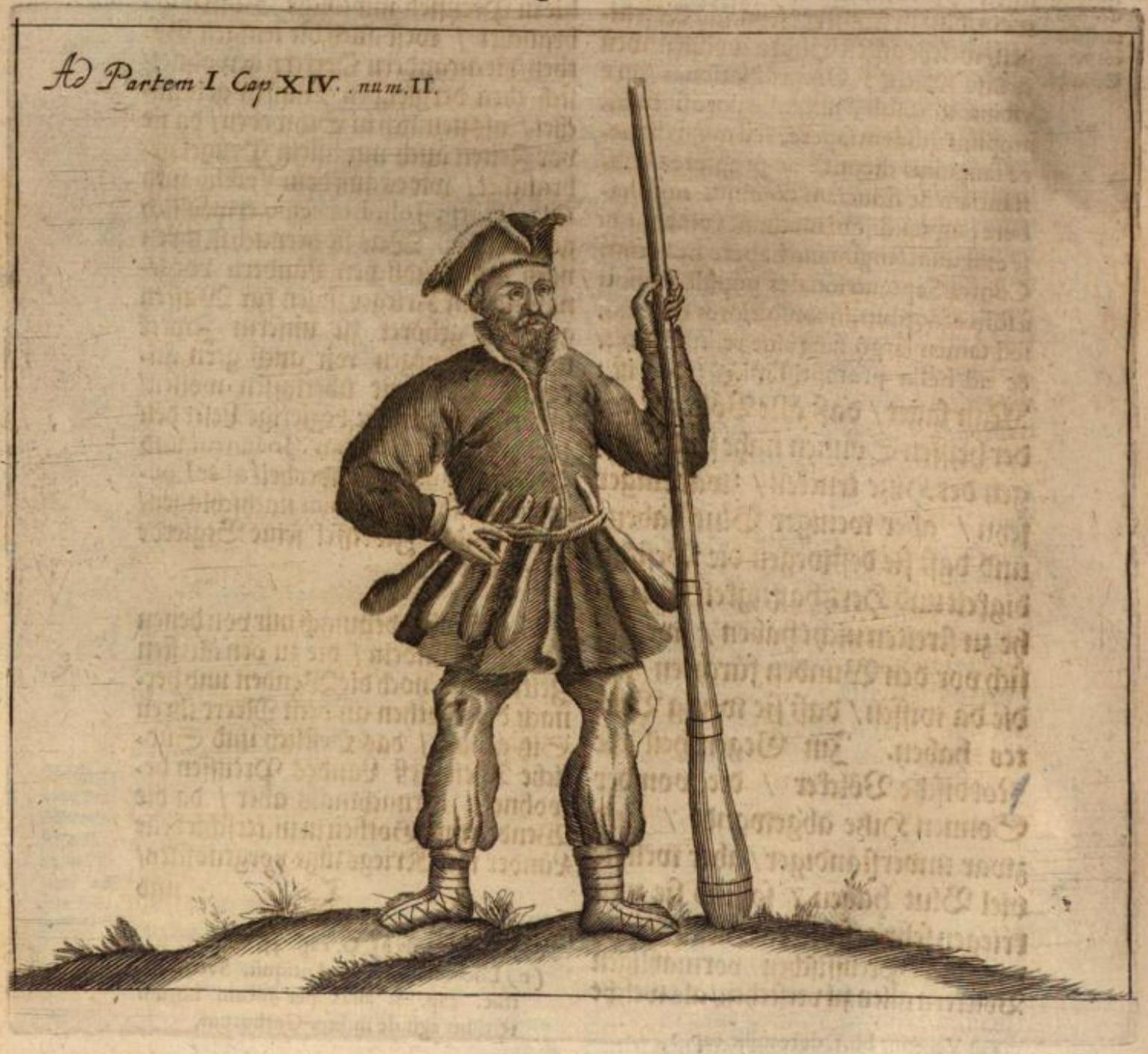
Engraving of a Prussian warrior with a club in Christoph Hartknoch's 1684 book "Old and New Prussia" (Alt- und Neues Preussen)

Characterized as a humble people, who dressed plainly, the Old Prussians were "distinguished for their valor and great bodily strength". They generally rejected luxury, yet were very hospitable, and enjoyed celebrating and drinking excessively, usually mead. Wulfstan of Hedeby, who visited the trading town of Truso at the Vistula Lagoon, observed that wealthy people drank fermented mare's milk kumis instead of mead. According to Adam of Bremen, the Sambians are said to have consumed horse blood as well as horse milk. He also mentions that horse meat was eaten.

Women held no powerful positions among the Old Prussians and, according to Peter von Dusburg, were treated like servants, forbidden to share the husband's table. Commercial marriage was widespread and after the husband's death, the widow fell to the son, like other inheritance. Polygyny, up to three wives, was widespread. Adultery was a serious crime, punishable with death. After the submission to the Teutonic Order, commercial marriage and polygyny were forbidden.

=== Burial customs ===
According to archaeological evidence, pre-Christian burial customs changed over the centuries.

During the Iron Age (5th century BCE – 1st century CE), the western Baltic kurgan and barrow culture were widespread among the Old Prussians. It was then that cremation in urns appeared. Grave mounds were raised over stone cells for up to 30 urns, or stone boxes for the urns were buried in Bronze Age style barrows.

During the early phase of imperial Rome, shallow graves appeared in which the corpse was buried in three coffins. Cremation with urns spread from the third century onwards. Except for the Samians and Sudauers, where shallow grave fields existed until Christianization, cremation pits without urns increasingly became the only form of burial among the Prussians. However, different forms of burial could occur side by side at the same time.

==== Stone babas ====
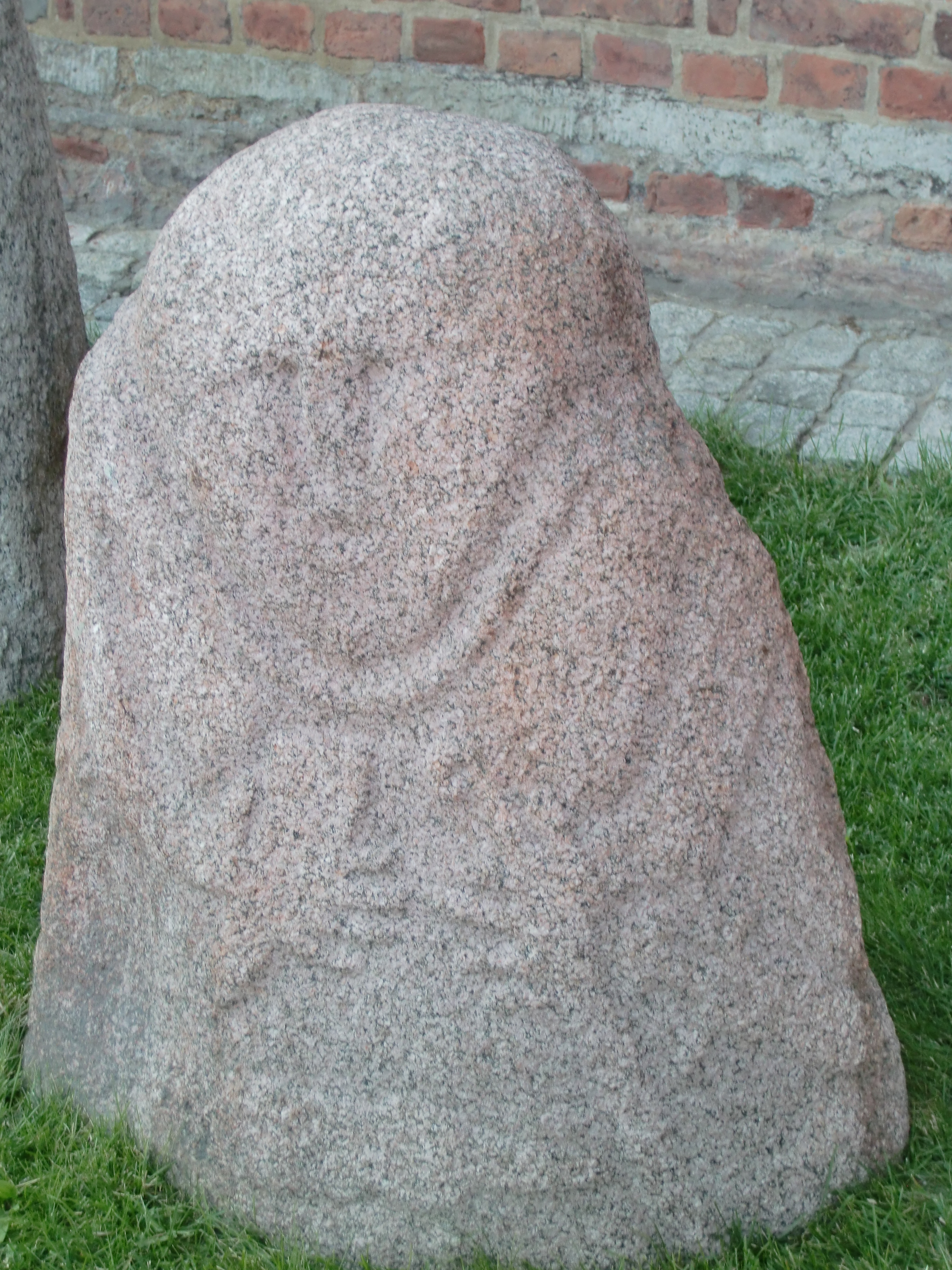
Prussian Hag – An Old Prussian Kurgan stele

The Stone babas, found all over Old Prussia, have for centuries caused considerable speculation and dissent among scholars. Beginning with a lack of confirmation about their original location and context, all subsequent questions on their age, the chronology of the objects, an exact definition of their function, and their provenance, pointing to which cultural influences have not been addressed until the late 19th century. A majority of past and present researchers agree that the babas were created between the 8th and 13th centuries as a "result of a long cultural process among the population of early Iron Age area of the south-eastern Baltic coast, which was affected by both the early traditions of the local craft and inspirations from countries already under Christian influence."

=== Old Prussian religion ===
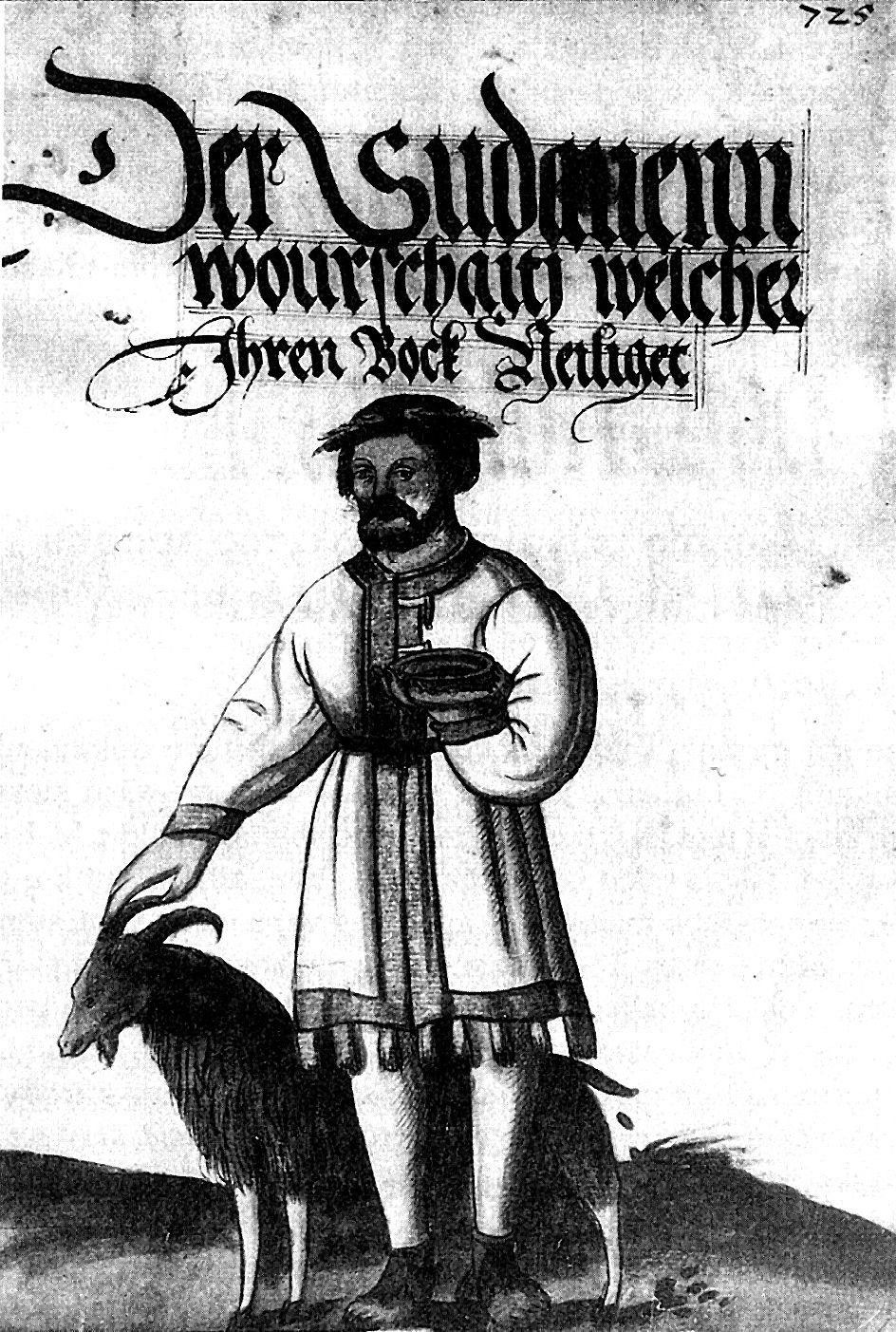
An illustration of a Prussian goat sacrifice from the 16th century Sudovian Book

Because they did not know God, therefore, in their error, they worshipped every creature as divine, namely the sun, moon and stars, thunder, birds, even four-legged animals, even the toad. They also had forests, fields and bodies of water, which they held so sacred that they neither chopped wood nor dared to cultivate fields or fish in them.

— Peter of Dusburg: Chronicon terrae Prussiae III,5,53

Baltic paganism has been described as a form of polydoxy, a belief in the sacredness of all natural forces and phenomena, not personified but possessing their own spirits and magical powers. They thought the world inhabited by a limitless number of spirits and demons, believed in a soul and an afterlife, and practiced ancestor worship. Some authors, by contrast, have argued for a well developed, sophisticated Old Prussian polytheism with a clearly defined pantheon of gods.

The highest priest Kriwe-Kriwajto was to be in permanent connection with the spirits of the dead ancestors. He lived in a sacred grove, the Romove, a place off limits to anyone but elite clergy. Each district was headed by its Kriwe, who also served as lawgiver and judge. The Kriwe-Kriwajto's next in rank, the Siggonen were expected to maintain the healthy spiritual connection with natural sacred sites, like springs and trees. The Wurskaiten – priests of lower rank – were supposed to superintend rites and ceremonies.

=== Christianisation ===
With the submission to the Teutonic Order in 1231, the Old Prussians were Christianised. How long the old paganism lived on cannot be inferred from the sources. Pagan customs are said to have lasted the longest with the remote Sudauers. In the 16th century, the so-called Sudovian Book (Sudauerbüchlein) was created, which described a list of gods, "pagan" festivals and goat sanctification. However, some researchers argue that this little book misinterpreted traditional folk customs as 'pagan' in the context of the Reformation.

== History ==
=== Early historical references ===
Cassiodorus's Variae, published in 537, contains a letter written by Cassiodorus in the name of Theodoric the Great, addressed to the Aesti:

It is gratifying to us to know that you have heard of our fame, and have sent ambassadors who have passed through so many strange nations to seek our friendship.
We have received the amber which you have sent us. You say that you gather this lightest of all substances from the shores of the ocean, but how it comes thither you know not. But as an author named Cornelius (Tacitus) informs us, it is gathered in the innermost islands of the ocean, being formed originally of the juice of a tree (whence its name succinum), and gradually hardened by the heat of the sun. Thus, it becomes an exuded metal, a transparent softness, sometimes blushing with the color of saffron, sometimes glowing with flame-like clearness. Then, gliding down to the margin of the sea, and further purified by the rolling of the tides, it is at length transported to your shores to be cast upon them. We have thought it better to point this out to you, lest you should imagine that your supposed secrets have escaped our knowledge. We sent you some presents by our ambassadors, and shall be glad to receive further visits from you by the road which you have thus opened up, and to show you future favors.

=== Medieval references ===
The Old Prussians are called Brus by the Bavarian Geographer in the ninth century.

=== Christian contact and conflict ===
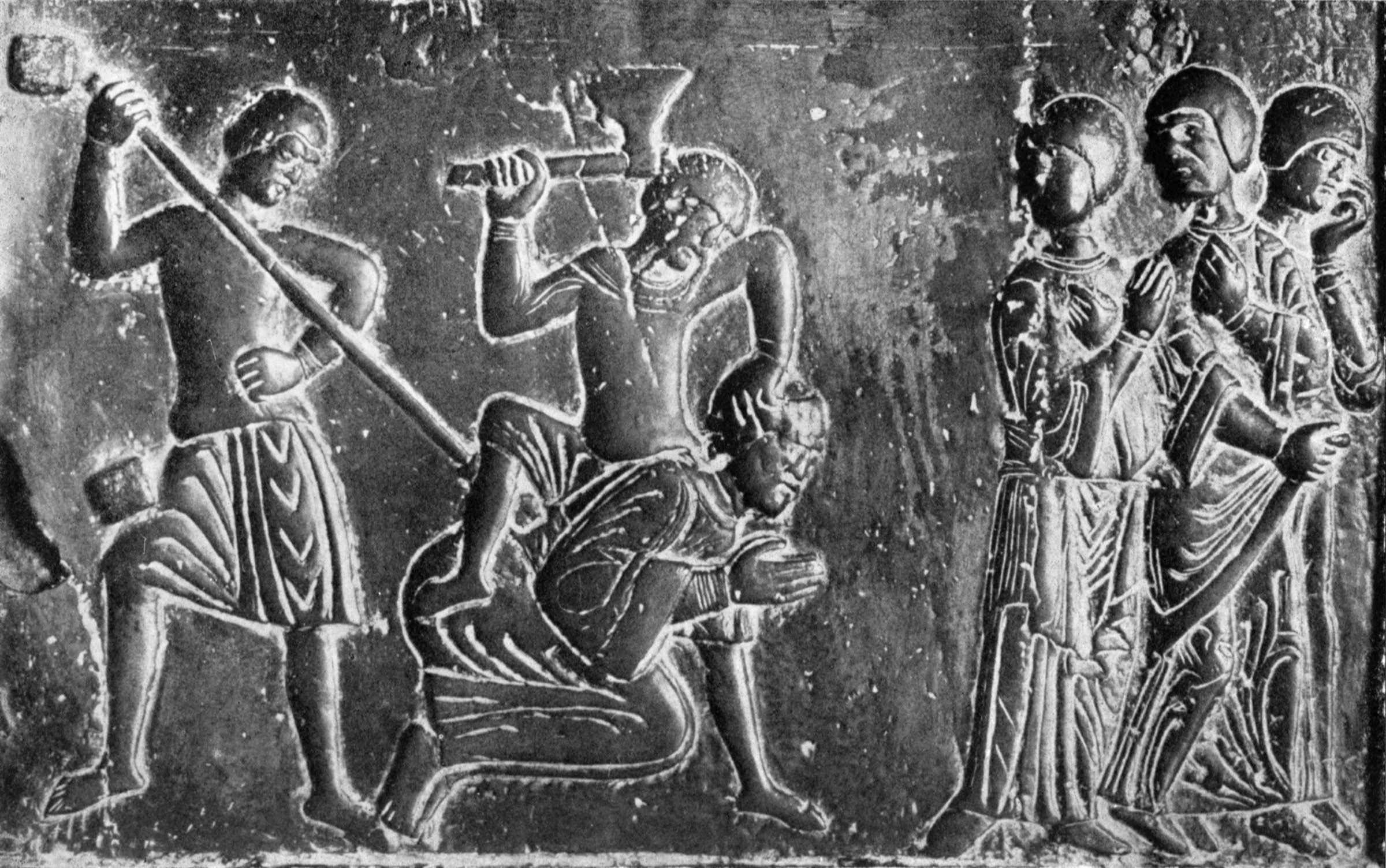
Medieval depiction of Prussians killing Saint Adalbert, the missionary bishop. Part of the Gniezno Doors, c. 1175

More extensive mention of the Old Prussians in historical sources is in connection with Adalbert of Prague, who was sent by Bolesław I of Poland. Adalbert was slain in 997 during a missionary effort to Christianise the Prussians. As soon as the first Polish dukes had been established with Mieszko I in 966, they undertook a number of conquests and crusades not only against Prussians and the closely related Sudovians, but against the Pomeranians and Wends as well.

Beginning in 1147, the Polish duke Bolesław IV the Curly (securing the help of Ruthenian troops) tried to subdue Prussia, supposedly as punishment for the close cooperation of Prussians with Władysław II the Exile. The only source is unclear about the results of his attempts, vaguely only mentioning that the Prussians were defeated. Whatever the results were, in 1157, some Prussian troops supported the Polish army in their fight against Emperor Frederick Barbarossa.

In 1166, two Polish dukes, Bolesław IV and his younger brother Henry, came into Prussia again over the Ossa River. The prepared Prussians led the Polish army, under the leadership of Henry, into an area of marshy morass. Whoever did not drown was felled by an arrow or by throwing clubs, and nearly all Polish troops perished. From 1191 to 1193, Casimir II the Just invaded Prussia, this time along the river Drewenz (Drwęca). He forced some of the Prussian tribes to pay tribute and then withdrew.

Several attacks by Konrad of Masovia in the early 13th century were also successfully repelled by the Prussians.

=== Crusade and conquest ===
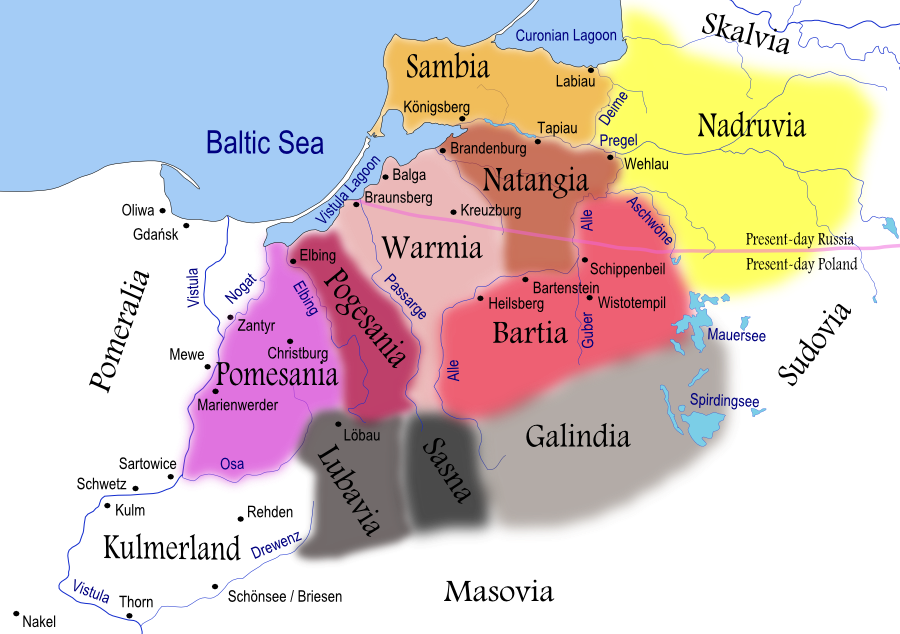
A map of the Old Prussian tribes after the subjugation by the Teutonic Order in the 13th century. The indicated towns feature Teutonic fortifications or castles, built to facilitate the conquest.

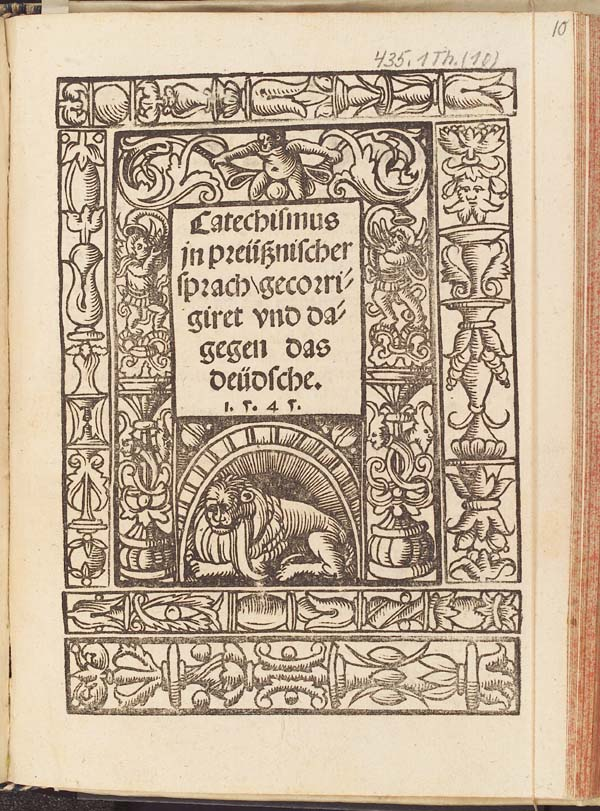
A translation of catechisms into Old Prussian published in 1545 in Königsberg

In 1209, Pope Innocent III commissioned the Cistercian monk Christian of Oliva with the conversion of the pagan Prussians. In 1215, Christian was installed as the first bishop of Prussia. The Duchy of Masovia, and especially the region of Culmerland, became the object of constant Prussian counter-raids. In response, Konrad I of Masovia called on the Pope for aid several times, and founded a military order (the Order of Dobrzyń) before calling on the Teutonic Order. The results were edicts calling for Northern Crusades against the Prussians.

In 1224, Emperor Frederick II proclaimed that he himself and the Empire took the population of Prussia and the neighboring provinces under their direct protection; the inhabitants were declared to be Reichsfreie, to be subordinated directly to the Church and the Empire only, and exempted from service to and the jurisdiction of other dukes. The Teutonic Order, officially subject directly to the Popes, but also under the control of the empire, took control of much of the Baltic, establishing their own monastic state in Prussia.

In 1230, following the Golden Bull of Rimini, Grand Master Hermann von Salza and Duke Konrad I of Masovia launched the Prussian Crusade, a joint invasion of Prussia to Christianise the Baltic Old Prussians. The Order then created the independent Monastic State of the Teutonic Knights in the conquered territory and subsequently conquered Courland, Livonia, and Estonia. The Dukes of Poland accused the Order of holding lands illegally.

During an attack on Prussia in 1233, over 21,000 crusaders took part, of which the burggrave of Magdeburg brought 5,000 warriors, Duke Henry of Silesia 3,000, Duke Konrad of Masovia 4,000, Duke Casimir of Kuyavia 2,000, Duke Wladyslaw of Greater Poland 2,200 and the Dukes of Pomerania 5,000 warriors. The main battle took place at the Sirgune River and the Prussians suffered a decisive defeat. The Prussians took the Christian bishop and imprisoned him for several years.

=== Teutonic rule ===
Numerous knights from throughout Catholic Europe joined in the Prussian Crusades, which lasted sixty years. Many of the native Prussians from Sudovia who survived were resettled in Samland; Sudauer Winkel was named after them. Frequent revolts, including a major rebellion in 1286, were defeated by the Teutonic Knights. In 1283, according to the chronicler of the Teutonic Knights, Peter of Dusburg, the conquest of the Prussians ended and the war with the Lithuanians began.

In 1243, papal legate William of Modena divided Prussia into four bishoprics – Culm, Pomesania, Ermland, and Samland – under the Bishopric of Riga. Prussians were baptised at the Archbishopric of Magdeburg, while Germans and Dutch settlers colonized the lands of the native Prussians; Poles and Lithuanians also settled in southern and eastern Prussia, respectively. Significant pockets of Old Prussians were left in a matrix of Germans throughout Prussia and in what is now the Kaliningrad Oblast.

=== Conversion and language ===
The monks and scholars of the Teutonic Order took an interest in the language spoken by the Prussians and tried to record it. In addition, missionaries needed to communicate with the Prussians in order to convert them. Records of the Old Prussian language therefore survive; along with little-known Galindian and better-known Sudovian, these records are all that remain of the West Baltic language group. As might be expected, it is a very archaic Baltic language.

=== Reformation and decline ===
Old Prussians resisted the Teutonic Knights and received help from the Grand Duchy of Lithuania during the 13th century in their quest to free themselves of the military order. In 1525, Grand Master Albert of Brandenburg-Ansbach secularized the Order's Prussian territories into the Protestant Duchy of Prussia, a vassal of the crown of Poland. During the Reformation, Lutheranism spread throughout the territories, officially in the Duchy of Prussia and unofficially in the Polish province of Royal Prussia, while Catholicism survived in the Prince-Bishopric of Warmia, the territory of secular rule comprising a third of the then Diocese of Warmia. With Protestantism came the use of the vernacular in church services instead of Latin, so Albert had the Catechisms translated into Old Prussian.

Because of the conquest of the Old Prussians by Germans, the Old Prussian language probably became extinct at the beginning of the 18th century, with the devastation of the rural population by plagues and the assimilation of the nobility and the larger population with Germans or Lithuanians. However, translations of the Bible, Old Prussian poems, and some other texts survived and have enabled scholars to reconstruct the language.
