= Ludwig von Liebenzell =

Teutonic knight

Ludwig von Liebenzell was a knight of the Teutonic Order in the 13th century. He was a Komtur of Ragnit in Prussia from 1294 to 1300.

Ludwig von Liebenzell is repeatedly mentioned in The Chronicle of the Prussian Land by Peter of Dusburg and the eponymous The Chronicle of Prussia by Nikolaus von Jeroschin both as a brave warrior and a skilled negotiator. Being a smart commander, he successfully combined advanced military arts with a strategy of manipulation and turning the enemies of the Teutonic Order against each other. As The Chronicle of Prussia by Nikolaus von Jeroschin reads,

Brother Ludwig was from a branch of a noble family, had learned the arts of war from an early age and performed many miraculous, valiant deeds in battle, which this book will describe later.

In 1280, Ludwig was taken prisoner by Skomantas of Sudovia during the campaign launched by Landmeister of Prussia Mangold von Sternberg against the Yotvingians in the region of Crasima in Yotvingia. While in captivity, Ludwig showed his diplomatic talent. He managed to befriend Skomantas and soon Skomantas released him. This is attested both in The Chronicle of the Prussian Land by Peter of Dusburg and The Chronicle of Prussia by Nikolaus von Jeroschin:

Brother Ludwig von Liebenzell was taken prisoner during this campaign. ... When the enemy captured him he was entrusted to Skumantas. He [Skomantas] saw him [Ludwig] an exceptional warrior and brave man like himself and for this reason he looked after him himself and enjoyed his company.... One of Skumantas's servants freed him from the bonds which kept him captive, took him away and brought him back to the brothers.

Afterwards in 1283, according to the above-mentioned The Chronicle of Prussia, Skomantas was voluntarily Christianized along with his people and became military ally of the Teutonic Knights, as The Chronicle of Prussia by Nikolaus von Jeroschin goes,

[H]e finally gave himself up to the brothers with his whole household and accepted the Christian faith by receiving baptism with all of his men.

In 1283, Ludwig took part in the raid in the region of Silia in Yotvingia organized and led by Marshal (German: Marschall; Ordensmarschall) Konrad von Thierberg (also known as Konrad von Tierberg the Younger). Although the raid had been successful, Ludwig was captured again, that time by a Yotvingian noblemen called Cantegerda.

The Teutonic Knights had long regarded Ludwig as missing. Meanwhile, being in his second captivity, Ludwig displayed his diplomacy skills again: he befriended Cantegerda and convinced him to convert together with all his subjects. Ludwig returned safely thereafter, bringing Cantegerda and 1,600 his people to the Order's possessions for christening. Nikolaus von Jeroschin states in The Chronicle of Prussia,

Master Konrad [von Tierberg the Younger] ... met Brother Ludwig von Liebenzell coming towards him from Sudovia, surrounded by a crowd of men and women. Among them was Cantegerda ... and about 1,600 heathens, all of whom he had converted from their error and brought to the path of the true faith by teaching them while he was a prisoner.

In 1294, Ludwig was appointed a Komtur of Ragnit. Right after his appointment, Ludwig led and fulfilled a number of successful offensive operations and devastating raids against the Grand Duchy of Lithuania, masterly setting local tribes against the then Grand Duke of Lithuania:

With his brothers at Ragnit he [Ludwig von Liebenzell] now threw himself fearlessly and with great cleverness and boldness into an unrelenting war against the heathens and took part in many laudable battles in many campaigns at sea and on land. On one occasion he sailed with his men to Aukštaitija, which is subject to the king of Lithuania. There was a large village there called Romene. In their simplicity the inhabitants of Aukštaitija considered the village to be sacred. The commander silently put the village in order, wreaking great destruction there, consecrating the natives under the banners of his own chaplains.... He conducted many campaigns, harrying Aukštaitija and plaguing them with violence and destruction.... There was one area known as Pograuden [in Samogitia] which he and his men secretly moved against, hiding the bulk of the army in an ambush and sending out a small troop to rampage across the region, killing and destroying and then moving on. This made the people very angry and they set off in hot pursuit with all of their horsemen chasing the raiders and not noticing the ambush until they were right upon it. Then there was a great clash; some ran away, the others set about them and killed all of the Lithuanian army so that only six horsemen escaped, according to reports, while all the others died. This event so weakened the mounted forces of the region of Pograuden that their numbers did not recover for a very long time. He did the same at Vaikiai.... With strategies like this ... during the six years that he was in command of Ragnit that he forced all the Lithuanians who lived along the Memel from the River Neris to the province of Lamotina to maintain peace with the Christians and to give the brothers at Ragnit an agreed yearly tribute.... [T]hey still liked him, so that even the nobles in the province of Samogitia incited the common people to rebel against the king.... He was also able to use amazing cunning to foment trouble among the provinces, to the point that in his day the king of Lithuania could not persuade the people of Samogitia by threats or pleas to fight on his side against the brothers.

== See also ==
- Prussian Crusade
