= Heinrich Stange =

Teutonic knight

Heinrich Stange (died 1252, Germau, Sambia) was a Teutonic knight who served in the land of Prussia administered by the Teutonic Order as the Komtur of Christburg from 1249 to 1252, simultaneously holding the position of the Vice Landmeister of Prussia.

In 1252, by order of Landmeister of Prussia Dietrich von Grüningen, Heinrich Stange led a campaign against the Sambians and died in the battle near the village of Germau in Sambia, as reported by Peter of Dusburg and Nikolaus von Jeroschin in both versions of The Chronicle of the Prussian Land,

The brother known as Heinrich Stange, the commander of Christburg and a magnificent hero in battle, assembled a large troop of brothers and armed men on the orders of the master, marched out in battle against the Sambians in the name of the Lord and entered their territory across the sea at the point where there is now a castle called Lochstädt (this was during the winter) and devastated the land far and wide, robbing, burning and killing with great ferocity as far as the village of Germau. The Sambians mounted their defence there and pressed them so hard that the brothers and their army turned and fled. When the commander saw this he set off against the enemy with the intention of holding them off for long enough that his men could escape unharmed. He fought like a lion, showing no fear and wounded many of them. Finally, however, the heathens surrounded him and beat him ferociously, keeping it up until they had knocked him from his horse. When his brother, Brother Hermann, saw this it caused him great distress to see his own flesh and blood being slaughtered in this way. He was seized by a great anger and he ran up and hit out at them valiantly, stabbing and slashing until many of the heathens lay at his feet, some dead, others wounded. In this way he protected his brother and they both inflicted great distress on many a Sambian. Finally they lay dead together on the battlefield. In the meantime the other men retreated without any difficulty and reached home safely.

== See also ==
- Prussian Crusade
