= Battle of Wopławki =

1311 battle in Poland

- Part of the Lithuanian Crusade
Date	7 April 1311
Location	Near Wopławki (German: Woplauken; Woplaucken)
Result	Teutonic victory

Belligerents
Grand Duchy of Lithuania	Teutonic Order

Commanders and leaders
Vytenis	Heinrich von Plötzke

Strength
4,000 Lithuanian warriors	80 or 150 Teutonic Knights; Prussian militiamen (the number is unknown)

Casualties and losses
from 2,800 to 3,000	40 or 60 men in the first assault; total death toll is unknown

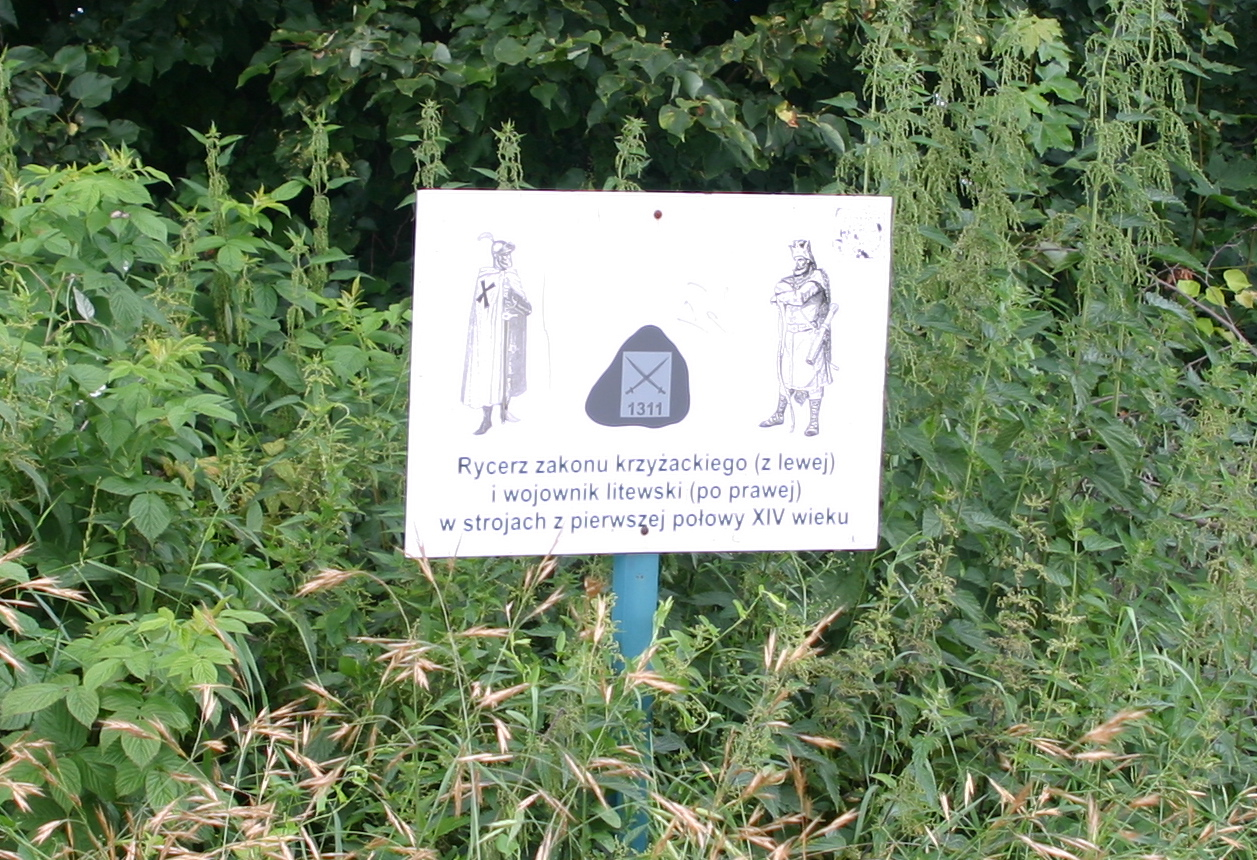
Monument to the battle between Lithuanian troops and the Teutonic Order in 1311, Wopławka area.

The Battle of Wopławki or Woplauken was fought on 7 April 1311 in the area near the village of Woplauken (Lithuanian - Voplaukis, now the Polish village of Wopławki), north-east of Kętrzyn (former Rastenburg). Belarusian historian Ruslan Gagua states in Annalistic Records on the Battle of Wopławki The battle definitely had become a major and significant one by medieval standards during the military confrontation of the Teutonic Order and the then Lithuania, according to The Nature of the Conduct of Warfare in Prussian and Lithuanian Borderlands at the Turn of the 13th and 14th Centuries by Ruslan Gagua.

== Historical background ==
Such major battles during the Lithuanian Crusade were rare. As reported by Russian historian Aleksiy Khoteev in On the Hundred Years' War of the Grand Duchy of Lithuania, military operations were generally confined to raids aimed at causing economic damage to the enemy as much as possible through the devastation of lands, seizure of property and taking local residents captive, as repeatedly attested and thoroughly reported in the Order's chronicles such as Chronicon terrae Prussiae (Latin for The Chronicle of the Prussian Land) by Peter of Dusburg, the eponymous The Chronicle of Prussia by Nikolaus von Jeroschin and Chronica nova Prutenica (Latin for New Prussian Chronicle) by Wigand of Marburg.

== Campaign and battle ==
On 3 April 1311, at the head of a force of 4,000 men (according to The Chronicle of the Prussian Land by Peter of Dusburg and The Chronicle of Prussia by Nikolaus von Jeroschin) Grand Duke of Lithuania Vytenis invaded Warmia, which was inhabited by baptized Warmians and German immigrants. His army totally looted and destroyed the lands of Warmia, killing most of local Christians and captured 1,200 people (according to Peter of Dusburg) or 1,300 (according to Nikolaus von Jeroschin).

Vytenis decided to return through the lands of Bartia. On 6 April, having reached the area near Woklauken, the Lithuanian army set up a camp on the hill, encircling it with abatis.

In the meantime, the Teutonic Order gathered an army under the command of Grosskomtur Heinrich von Plötzke and sent it to chase Vytenis. The army consisted of Teutonic Knights numbering 80 according to Nikolaus von Jeroschin or 150 according to Peter of Dusburg. Reporting on the number of the Teutonic Knights themselves, however, neither Peter of Dusburg nor Nikolaus von Jeroschin provides any data on the number of Sariantbrothers, i.e. not knighted members of the Order, who used to make up the bulk of the Order’s army at the time (including lances fournies). Peter of Dusburg just confines his report to "many men," as well as Nikolaus von Jeroschin mentions "many other valiant heroes" and "many skilled and tested bold warriors."

Another chronicler of the Order, Wigand of Marburg, provides in Chronica nova Prutenica the titles of the units led by Heinrich von Plötzke: the Banner of the Commandery of Ragnit, the Banner of the Commander of Insterburg, the Banner of Saint George, the Banner of Saint Mary and the Banner of Preußisch Holland. Besides, according to Konrad Gesselen (who translated into Low German the aforementioned Chronica nova Prutenica), a part of the army was composed of Prussian militiamen. However, none of these authors provides the number of the not knighted crusaders or the Prussian militiamen.

The vanguard led by Komtur of Christburg Günther von Arnstein was dispatched ahead. On 7 April, having reached Vytenis’ camp, the vanguard immediately attacked the Lithuanians

The first storming was successfully repulsed by the Lithuanians. Taking advantage of the camp’s location, showering the crusaders with arrows and javelins, the Lithuanians forced them to retreat. At that time the main part of the army led by von Plötzke had arrived and formed up for battle. Joined by the vanguard, the main body launched a new assault on the camp. This time, the Lithuanian warriors were unable to withstand the onslaught. Being overcome with panic, the Lithuanian fighters began to retreat in disorder, and then the battle turned into a mass slaughter.

All the captured Christians were released, according to Nikolaus von Jeroschin.

== Casualties ==
=== Lithuanian casualties ===
According to Nikolaus von Jeroschin, the crusaders captured 2,800 horses whose owners were killed in the camp, which in turn suggests that more than half of the Lithuanian riders were killed in pursuit.

Another source—Canonici Sambiensis epitome gestorum Prussie—states that 3,000 Lithuanians were killed in this battle.

As to Vytenis, he managed to survive together with the remnants of his army and reached his domain.

=== Crusaders casualties ===
According to Nikolaus von Jeroschin, "In the first assault the Christians lost 40 men," whereas Peter of Dusburg claims that 60 crusaders died in the first assault. Besides, there are no data of the crusaders’ total death toll.

== Aftermath ==
The victory at Wopławki allowed the Teutonic Knights to gain a foothold on the border with the Grand Duchy of Lithuania by building the castle of Christmemel, as attested in the abovementioned chronicles both by Peter of Dusburg and Nikolaus von Jeroschin In 1315, Vytenis tried to capture Christmemel but did not succeed.

== See also ==
- Lithuanian Crusade
- Northern Crusades

== Sources ==
=== Primary sources ===
- The Chronicle of Prussia by Nikolaus von Jeroschin (in English)
- A History of the Teutonic Knights in Prussia 1190-1331: The Kronike Von Pruzinlant by Nikolaus von Jeroschin (in English)
- Chronicon terrae Prussiae by Peter of Dusburg (in Russian)
- "Vigand iz Marburga. Novaya prusskaya khronika (1394)" [Wigand of Marburg.New Prussian Chronicle (1394)]. Dom-Knig [House of Books] (in Russian).
- Canonici Sambiensis epitome gestorum Prussie (in Russian)
- Canonici Sambiensis epitome gestorum Prussie (in Russian)

=== Secondary sources ===
- Khoteev, A.S. "O stoletnei voine Velikogo knyazhestva Litovskogo" [On the Hundred Years' War of the Grand Duchy of Lithuania]. Fond strategicheskoi kultury [Strategic Culture Fund] (in Russian).
- Gagua, R.B. "Letopisnye soobshcheniya o bitve pri Voplavkakh" [Annalistic Records on the Battle of Wopławki]. Besplatnaya Internet Biblioteka – Sobranie dokumentov [Free Online Library – Compilation of Documents] (in Russian).
- Gagua, R.B. "Kharakter vedeniya voennykh deystviy na prussko-litovskom pogranich'e na rubezhe XIII i XIV stoletiy" [The Nature of the Conduct of Warfare in Prussian and Lithuanian Borderlands at the Turn of the 13th and 14th Centuries]. CyberLeninka (in Russian).
- Gagua, R.B. "Bitva pod Voplavkami: krakh antikrestovykh pokhodov velikogo knyazya litovskogo Vitenya" [The Battle of Woplawki: the Fall of Anticrusaders Campaigns of Grand Duke of Lituania Vitenes]. Repozitoriy Polesskogo gosudarstvennogo universiteta [Palessie State University Repository] (in Russian).
