= Stenckel von Bentheim =

Stenckel von Bentheim, also known as Schenckel von Bentheim and Seno von Bynthausen, was a knight of Westphalia mentioned in The Chronicle of the Prussian Land (Latin: Chronicon terrae Prussiae) by Peter of Dusburg and the eponymous The Chronicle of Prussia by Nikolaus von Jeroschin. He took part as a so-called guest knight (or a ‘‘pilgrim’’) in the Prussian Crusade and died in the Battle of Pokarwis in 1261, as described by Peter of Dusburg and Nikolaus von Jeroschin in the aforementioned chronicles:

The brothers and the Christians fought back valiantly, particularly one, a good pure knight called Lord Schenckel of Bentheim who came from Westphalia. He had heard a bishop there preaching to the people that all of the Christian souls who were killed by the heathens in Prussia entered heaven directly without going through purgatory. This reward was precious above all others to this knight. He spurred on his horse and charged, carrying his spear as knights do, and charged through the enemy front line and into the main army. His charge inflicted serious injury on many Prussians; his sharpedged salute killed many on both sides. When he had charged through them, and he was turning back and had reached the middle of the army, this laudable warrior of God was knocked down.

The above-mentioned reward, for which Stenckel von Bentheim sacrificed his life in action, refers to a crusade indulgence granted to each crusader, as attested by Peter of Dusburg and Nikolaus von Jeroschin in the chronicles:

In the meantime Grand Master Hermann von Salza, a far-sighted man and clever strategist, went to the pope. Among other things that he asked for on behalf of his order, he requested that the pope should designate certain lands and regions for the preaching of a crusade for the benefit of Prussia. This pope, and Innocent IV who succeeded him, awarded absolution to all pilgrims who went to Prussia and Livonia in God’s name to put an end to the devil’s contempt and to protect the faith, with all the benefits, eternal privileges and complete certainty that had always been given to the pilgrims who went on crusade to Jerusalem in the Holy Land.

== See also ==
- Battle of Pokarwis
- Prussian Crusade
- Prussian uprisings
- Northern Crusades
