= Hermann Balk =

Landmeister in Livland (died 1239)

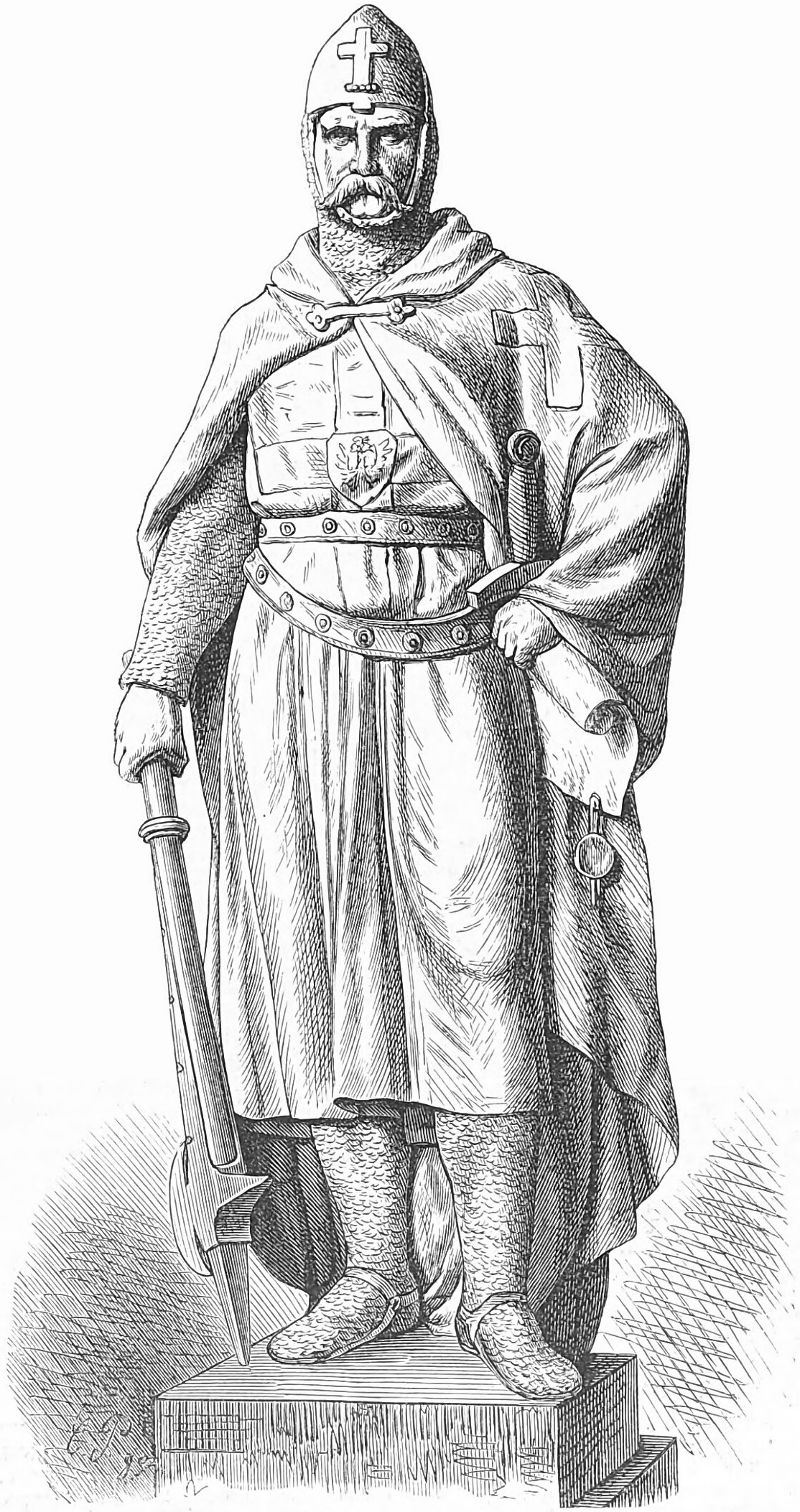
- Drawing of a statue of Hermann Balk by German sculptor Otto Geyer
- Died: March 5, 1239; Würzburg

Hermann Balk (died March 5, 1239), also known as Hermann von Balk or Hermann Balke, was a Knight-Brother of the Teutonic Order and its first Landmeister, or Provincial Master, in both Prussia and Livonia. From 1219 to 1227, he served as the Deutschmeister in the Order's Province of Alemannia. Balk led the crusaders during the Prussian Crusade and became Master of Prussia in 1230. From 1237 to 1238, he also served in the additional role as Master of Livonia.

== Life ==
Balk came from a family of Lower Saxon-Markish origin. He may have been a former canon at Hildesheim and may have joined the Teutonic Knights at Acre in 1189. He was well respected by fellow Roman Catholics, but he had no patience for pagans. His leadership and traditions were emulated by his successors throughout the 13th century, and he created the master's seal presenting the flight into Egypt. While all other masters' seals were anonymous, only Balk's included his name.

In 1226, the Teutonic Knights were invited to combat the Old Prussians by Duke Conrad I of Masovia, whose lands had been raided by the pagans over the preceding decades. Balk led the first substantial detachment of Teutonic Knights to Castle Vogelsang near Toruń. The master allegedly negotiated the Treaty of Kruszwica (possibly a later forgery by the knights) with Conrad in 1230, by which the Teutonic Knights would control Culmerland and future conquests instead of them passing to the Masovian duke or Bishop Christian of Oliva; the arrangement was similar to what had been agreed upon by Emperor Frederick II in the 1226 Golden Bull of Rimini.

Granted the titles of Landpfleger (per Sclavoniam et Prusiam preceptor) and Landmeister, Balk led the Teutonic Knights during the conquests of Culmerland, Pomesania, and northern Warmia in the first decade of the Prussian Crusade, the 1230s. Because the Teutonic Order's primary focus was defending Outremer, Balk, the "Pizarro of the Baltic lands", had limited resources at his disposal. He utilized guerilla warfare, forest ambushes, and his white-cloaked cavalry in winter campaigns; the master crossed the Vistula in 1231 to hang a Prussian chief from a sacred oak tree. Balk allowed tribes who accepted Christianity to become auxiliaries of the Teutonic Knights and left them with their lands, while tribes that remained pagan were defeated and expelled. Ballistae and crossbows were used by the crusaders to capture the Prussians' forts.

Under Balk's leadership, castles were built at Marienwerder (Kwidzyn), Culm (Chełmno), Elbing (Elbląg), Thorn (Toruń), and Rheden. The master encouraged the settlement of German colonists near Teutonic Ordensburg castles; the municipal privileges granted to Culm and Toruń on 28 December 1233 by Balk and Grand Master Hermann von Salza became the basis for Culm law, which was later applied to other developing towns in Prussia.

The Livonian Brothers of the Sword, a German military order active in Livonia, were crushed by Samogitians in the 1236 Battle of Saule. The remnants of the Sword-Brothers were assimilated into the Teutonic Order the following year, and Balk was given the charge of reorganizing the new brethren. He recruited sixty knights from the Teutonic Order's north German convents, as they spoke the Low German used by the Sword-Brothers. After sailing to Riga, he distributed his troops to reinforce the countryside. At Stensby in 1238, Balk returned Danish Estonia, which had been conquered by the Sword-Brothers, to King Valdemar II of Denmark. The upset Livonian Brethren refused to cooperate with Balk, who traveled to Italy to seek aid from Grand Master Hermann von Salza and Pope Gregory IX. Balk received little assistance, as Gregory IX was feuding with Emperor Frederick II and Hermann von Salza died in Salerno. Dietrich von Grüningen was named Master of Livonia later in 1238, and Balk died at Würzburg in Franconia the next year.

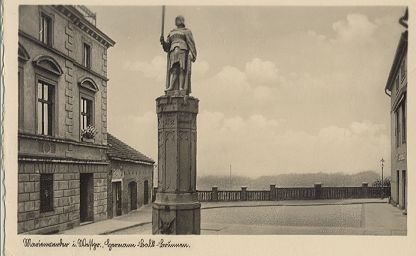
This 1922 postcard of the Hermann Balk Fountain in Marienwerder (destroyed 1945) depicts Balk in historically incorrect Late Middle Ages attire.
