= Prussian Chronicle =

Prussian Chronicle or Teutonic Chronicle can refer to one of the several medieval chronicles:

- Chronicon terrae Prussiae by Peter von Dusburg (written between 1324 and 1326)
- by Nikolaus von Jeroschin, translation of Peter von Dusburg's chronicle written between 1331 and 1335
- Chronica nova Prutenica (New Prussian Chronicle) by Wigand of Marburg (covers the period between 1293 and 1394)
- by Johann von Posilge (written by 1419)
- by Simon Grunau (written between 1510 and 1529)
- by Lucas David (written between 1550 and 1583)
