= 1258 =

1258 in various calendars
| Gregorian calendar | 1258; MCCLVIII |
| Ab urbe condita | 2011 |
| Armenian calendar | 707; ԹՎ ՉԷ |
| Assyrian calendar | 6008 |
| Balinese saka calendar | 1179–1180 |
| Bengali calendar | 664–665 |
| Berber calendar | 2208 |
| English Regnal year | 42 Hen. 3 – 43 Hen. 3 |
| Buddhist calendar | 1802 |
| Burmese calendar | 620 |
| Byzantine calendar | 6766–6767 |
| Chinese calendar | 丁巳年 (Fire Snake); 3955 or 3748 — to — 戊午年 (Earth Horse); 3956 or 3749 |
| Coptic calendar | 974–975 |
| Discordian calendar | 2424 |
| Ethiopian calendar | 1250–1251 |
| Hebrew calendar | 5018–5019 |
- Hindu calendars
| Vikram Samvat | 1314–1315 |
| Shaka Samvat | 1179–1180 |
| Kali Yuga | 4358–4359 |
| Holocene calendar | 11258 |
| Igbo calendar | 258–259 |
| Iranian calendar | 636–637 |
| Islamic calendar | 655–656 |
| Japanese calendar | Shōka (era) 2 (正嘉２年) |
| Javanese calendar | 1167–1168 |
| Julian calendar | 1258; MCCLVIII |
| Korean calendar | 3591 |
| Minguo calendar | 654 before ROC 民前654年 |
| Nanakshahi calendar | −210 |
| Thai solar calendar | 1800–1801 |
| Tibetan calendar | མེ་མོ་སྦྲུལ་ལོ་ (female Fire-Snake); 1384 or 1003 or 231 — to — ས་ཕོ་རྟ་ལོ་ (male Earth-Horse); 1385 or 1004 or 232 |

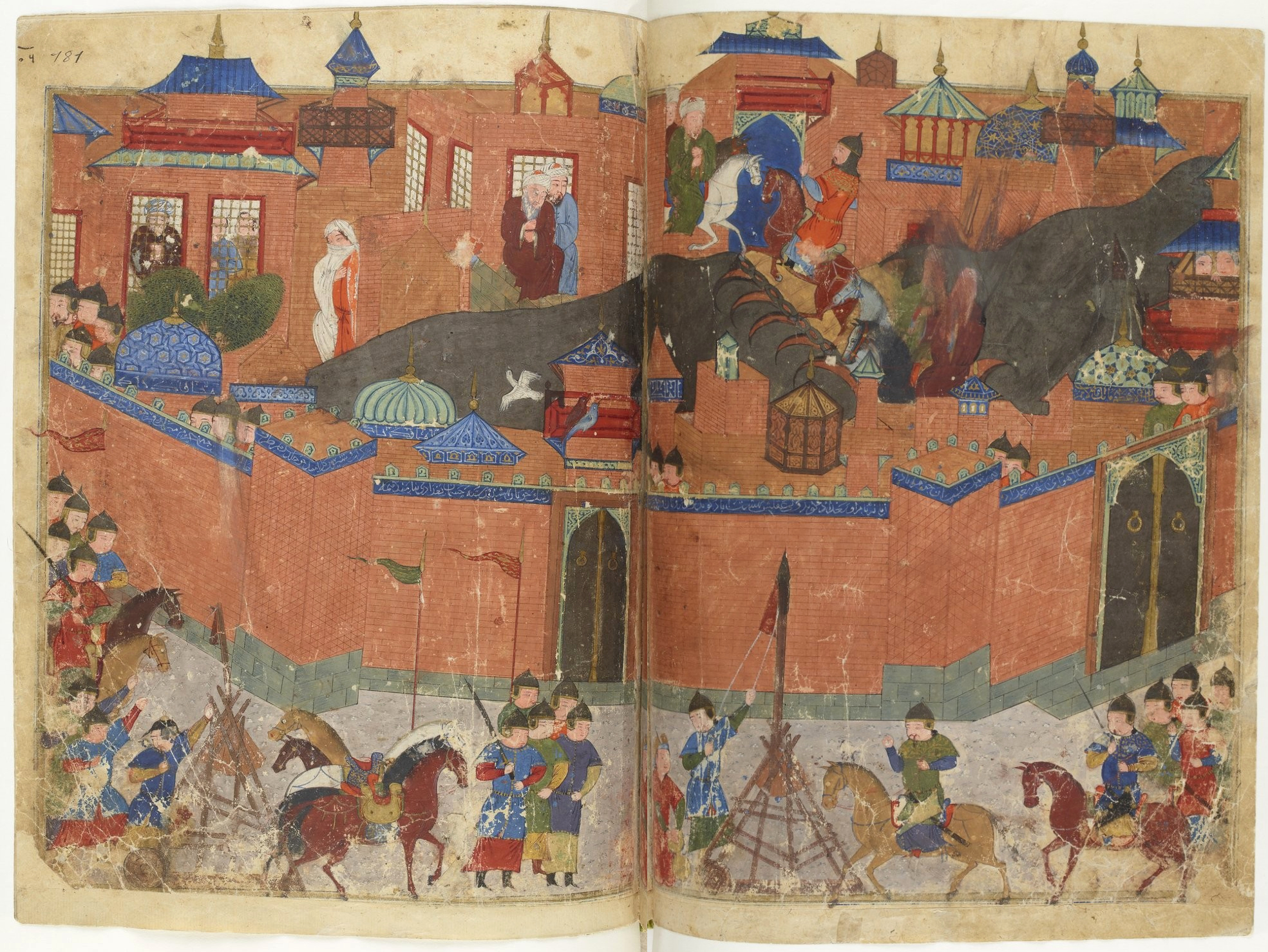
Mongols besiege the walls of Baghdad

Year 1258 (MCCLVIII) was a common year starting on Tuesday of the Julian calendar.

== Events ==
=== By place ===
==== Mongol Empire ====
- February 10 – Siege of Baghdad: Mongol forces (some 150,000 men), led by Hulagu Khan, besiege and conquer Baghdad after a siege of 13 days. During the first week of February, the eastern walls begin to collapse, and the Mongols swarm into the city, on February 10. Caliph Al-Musta'sim surrenders himself to Hulagu – together with all the Abbasid chief officers and officials. They are ordered to lay down their arms, and are massacred. Hulagu imprisons Al-Musta'sim among his treasures, to starve him to death. Meanwhile, massacres continue throughout the whole city; in 40 days about 80,000 citizens are murdered. The only survivors are the ones who are hiding in cellars which are not discovered, and a number of attractive girls and boys who are kept to be slaves, and the Christian community, who take refuge in the churches which are left undisturbed, by the special orders of Hulagu's wife, Doquz Khatun.
- February 15 – Hulagu Khan enters Baghdad, where many quarters of the city are ruined by fire. The House of Wisdom (or Great Library) is destroyed, numerous precious book collections are thrown into the Tigris River. Before the siege, about 400,000 manuscripts are rescued by Nasir al-Din al-Tusi, Persian polymath and theologian, who takes them to Maragheh observatory (located in East Azerbaijan Province). The sack of Baghdad brings an end to the Abbasid Caliphate (750–1258) and the Islamic Golden Age. Many professors, physicians, scientists, clerics, artists and lecturers are also massacred.

==== Europe ====
- May 11 – Treaty of Corbeil: King Louis IX of France ("the Saint") signs a peace treaty with King James I of Aragon ("the Conqueror"). Louis, heir of Charlemagne, formally renounces his feudal overlordship over Catalonia (independent de facto since 988), while James renounces his claims over Occitania.
- June – War of the Euboeote Succession: Achaean forces under William II Villehardouin defeat a coalition of Greek princes led by Guy I de la Roche ("Great Lord"), duke of Athens, which ends the conflict, on August 6.
- August 10 – Manfred, son of the late Emperor Frederick II, is crowned king of Sicily at Palermo. Pope Alexander IV, who has an alliance with the Saracens, declares the coronation void and excommunicates Manfred.
- August 16 – Theodore II Laskaris dies after a 4-year reign at Magnesia. He is succeeded by his 7-year-old son, John IV, as ruler of the Empire of Nicaea. His regent becomes the bureaucrat George Mouzalon.
- August 25 – George Mouzalon is assassinated in Magnesia ad Sipylum, as part of a conspiracy led by Byzantine nobles, under future Emperor Michael VIII Palaiologos.
- Gissur Þorvaldsson, Icelandic chieftain (or goði), is made Earl of Iceland for his loyal service to King Haakon IV of Norway ("the Old").

==== British Isles ====
- May 2 – King Henry III of England accepts the demand of Simon de Montfort and his baronial supporters that the government is reformed with a committee of 22 barons, including the king. As an act of faith, Simon de Montfort hands over his estates at Odiham and Kenilworth as part of the proposals. The Provisions of Oxford establish baronial control of the government, also known as the Oxford Parliament, on June 11.
- Llywelyn ap Gruffudd proclaims himself Prince of Wales, first used in an agreement between Llywelyn and his supporters and the Scottish nobility. He becomes the final ruler of an independent Wales before the conquest of Wales by Edward I of England.
- Irish, assisted by Scottish gallowglasses, halt the English advance westward through Ireland.

==== Levant ====
- June 25 – Battle of Acre: The Genoese send an armada (some 50 galleys) to relieve the blockade at Acre and ask for the assistance of Philip of Montfort, lord of Tyre, and the Knights Hospitaller for a combined attack from the land side. The Genoese fleet's arrival takes the Venetians by surprise but the superior experience and seamanship result in a crushing Venetian victory, with half the Genoese ships lost. Later, the Genoese garrison is forced to abandon Acre.

==== Asia ====
- Mongol invasions of Vietnam: Mongol forces (some 30,000 men) under Uriyangkhadai, son of Subutai, invade Vietnam. After many battles, the Vietnam army is routed and defeated. The senior leaders are able to escape on prepared boats, while the remnants are destroyed on the banks of the Red River. The Mongols occupy the capital city, Thăng Long (modern-day Hanoi), and massacres the city's inhabitants, by the end of January.

=== By topic ===
==== Global ====
- The consequences of the volcanic 1257 Samalas eruption in Indonesia include the following anecdotal accounts: very dry fog in France; lunar eclipses in England; severe winter in Europe; a harsh spring in Iceland; famine in England, Germany, France and Italy; and pestilence in London, parts of France, Austria, Iraq, Syria, and southeast Turkey.

==== Markets ====
- The Republic of Genoa starts imposing forced loans, known as luoghi, onto its taxpayers; they are a common resource of medieval public finance.

==== Religion ====
- September 29 – Consecration of the newly rebuilt Salisbury Cathedral in England.
- Civil unrest in northern Italy spawns the medieval musical form of Geisslerlieder, penitential songs sung by wandering bands of Flagellants.
- Kudahuvadhoo is converted to Islam.

== Births ==
- Osman I, founder of the Great Ottoman Empire (d. 1324)
- March 8 – Arghun Khan, Mongol ruler of the Ilkhanate (d. 1291)
- October 10 – Joachim Piccolomini, Italian altar server (d. 1305)
- October 20 – Bolko I, Polish co-ruler (House of Piast) (d. 1313)
- December 7 – Trần Nhân Tông, Vietnamese emperor (d. 1308)
- Bertrand of Saint-Geniès, French academic lawyer and patriarch (d. 1350)
- Ferrantino Malatesta, Italian nobleman and knight (d. 1353)
- Henry I, Count of Holstein-Rendsburg, German nobleman (House of Schaumburg) (d. 1304)
- Henry Probus (Henryk IV Probus or Prawy, "the Righteous"), High Duke of Poland (d. 1290)
- John I, French nobleman (House of Chalon-Arlay) (d. 1315)
- Liu Guandao (or Zhong Xian), Chinese court artist (d. 1336)
- Usman Serajuddin, Bengali Sufi scholar and mystic (d. 1357)

== Deaths ==
- January 6 – Konrad I von Wallhausen, bishop of Meissen
- February 20 – Al-Musta'sim, Abbasid caliph of Baghdad
- March 19? – Clement of Dunblane, Scottish cleric, friar and bishop
- March 26 – Floris de Voogd, Dutch nobleman (b. 1228)
- April 5
  - Juliana of Liège, Flemish nun, mystic and saint
  - Pełka (or Fulko), Polish archbishop of Gniezno
- April 14 – Rüdiger of Bergheim, German bishop (b. 1175)
- May 10 – Sewal de Bovil, English cleric and archbishop
- June 2
  - Edmund de Lacy, English nobleman and knight
  - Peter I, Count of Urgell (or Pedro), Portuguese prince (b. 1187)
- June 15 – Ada of Holland, Dutch noblewoman (b. 1208)
- June – Ibn Abi'l-Hadid, Abbasid scholar and writer (b. 1190)
- July 22 – Meinhard I, count of Gorizia (House of Gorizia)
- August 8 – Henry of Lexington, English cleric and bishop
- August 14 – John of Wallingford, English abbot, historian and writer
- August 18 – Theodore II Laskaris, emperor of Nicaea
- August 25 – George Mouzalon, Byzantine high official
- August 28 – Gerhard II of Lippe, German archbishop
- October/November – Walter Comyn, Lord of Badenoch, Scottish magnate, adviser and regent
- November 8 – Grzymisława of Łuck, Polish princess
- November 10 – William de Bondington, Scottish bishop
- November 23 – John Fitzgeoffrey, English nobleman
- Abu Yahya ibn Abd al-Haqq, Marinid sultan
- Al-Shadhili, Almohad Sufi leader (b. 1196)
- Al-Mahdi Ahmad bin al-Husayn, Yemeni ruler, killed in battle (b. 1216)
- Baha al-Din Zuhayr, Arab secretary and poet (b. 1186)
- Bartholomew of Brescia, Italian teacher and canonist
- Bruno of Altena-Isenberg, prince-bishop of Osnabrück
- Ch'oe Ŭi, Korean military leader and dictator (b. 1233)
- Eberhard von Sayn, German knight and Landmeister
- Fujiwara no Tomoie, Japanese nobleman (b. 1182)
- Guillaume de Chateauneuf, French Grand Master
- Hong Pok-wŏn, Korean general and official, perhaps executed (b. 1206)
- Ingerd Jakobsdatter, Danish noblewoman (b. 1200)
- John of Arsuf (or Ibelin), Outremer nobleman (b. 1211)
- Robert de la Piere, French magistrate and troubadour
