= Eberhard von Sayn =

Grand Marshal of the Teutonic Order from 1251 to 1254

Eberhard von Sayn, sometimes Eberhardus de Seyne or Everart de Saine (died 1258), was a Teutonic Knight, Grosskomtur, Landmeister and finally Grand Marshal of the Teutonic Order from 1251 to 1254.

== Biography ==
Eberhard von Sayn came from a family of counts whose ancestral seat was Sayn Castle, in Rhineland-Palatinate and north of Koblenz. It is assumed that Eberhard may have been the grandson of Count Eberhard II von Sayn, founder of the cadet branch of the family.

It is not known when Eberhard joined the Teutonic Order, but appeared in sources for the first time in 1249, when he was already a great commander. At that time he was in Palestine, acting in place of Grand Master Heinrich von Hohenlohe who was not present in Palestine. In 1251, he assumed the position of Landmeister of Prussia. In the autumn of the same year, on the instructions of the new Grand Master Günther von Wüllersleben, he left for Prussia and Livonia. Despite being ordered to oversee the Baltic provinces, Eberhard von Sayn is presumed to have exercised effective power during his stay in both provinces. In Prussia he took over from the absent Landmeister Dietrich von Grüningen, while in Livonia he replaced Landmeister in Livland Andreas von Felben.

The first province he visited was Prussia, where on 1 October 1251 he ordered the rebuilding of the destroyed Toruń and Chełmno. Upon learning of the difficulties of functioning of the monastic state in Prussia, Eberhard turned to the Grand Master who was in Acre for help. A messenger, in the person of Brother Ottone, returned from the Holy Land with a set of statutes that regulated the functioning of the new province and its relations with the highest religious authorities, who were based in Venice. Eberhard von Sayn promulgated these statutes, most likely in early 1252. The next stage of Eberhard's mission was in Livonia, where he remained from summer 1252 to spring 1254. During this period, acting as interim Landmeister, he managed to resolve the relations between the Teutonic Order and the local bishops, specifically in Riga, Dorpat, Ösel and Courland. He also contributed to the construction of Memel Castle in 1252 and led at least one armed expedition against the Samogitians.

After his success in arranging the internal affairs of the two monastic provinces, Eberhard von Sayn resigned from the post of Landmeister of Prussia and probably returned to the Holy Land. It is also assumed that upon his return to Palestine he assumed the position of Grosskomtur until at least September 1257. Eberhard von Sayn died in 1258.
