= Sufi Way =

Arabic poem by the Sufi mystic and scholar Shayk Umar ibn al-Farid

Poem of the Sufi Way, or Nazm al-suluk, is an Arabic poem by the Sufi mystic and scholar Umar ibn al-Farid. An exact date of the poem's writing is unknown as Ibn al-Farid (1181–1235) is said to have written this text over the course of many years. Widely remarked as Ibn al-Farid's most famous work, the poem itself is one of the longest pieces of Sufi literature to date, and is still held in high regard by modern Sufi practitioners. It is 760 verses long. It is often referred to as al-Ta'iyya al-kubra (the Greater Poem Rhyming in T) to differentiate it from a shorter ode that also rhymes in t. The title can also be translated to “the Poem of Progress”.

== Origins ==
The origins of this work are shrouded in mythology. Most accounts of the poem's construction derive from Ibn al-Farid's grandson in his biographical work “Adorned Proem to the Diwan” (Dibijat al-Diwan), heralding his grandfather's legacy and many of the stories surrounding it. According to Ali, Ibn al-Farid “would fall into deathlike trances for days, then recover and spontaneously recite verses directly inspired by God; these verses were then collected to form this long ode”. In another story related by Ali, it is said that Ibn al-Farid received instruction from Muhammad himself, requesting that he title it as the “Poem of the Sufi Way”, instead of the original title intended by Ibn al-Farid, “The Diaries of Hearts and the Gardens' Sweet Scents”.

== Content ==
The poem itself is designed to demonstrate a pluralistic and mystical connection to God, or Allah. Initially, the poem likens the pursuit of God's love to the pursuit of a female, written from the man's perspective. The narrator becomes increasingly humbled throughout the poem, and, after much desperation and awe, the link to the narrator's lover, or God, becomes obscured to the point of total cohesion. This felt harmony and connection on an equal level with God is characteristically Sufi, yet it is also an area of critique from Muslim orthodoxies who label such possibility of equality with God as heresy.

=== Translation ===
The translation of the poem is known for its difficulty. There are many puns based on variations of the three-consonant radical of most Arabic words, as was custom to the mannerist (badi'a) poetry of the time.

=== Thematic material ===
As expected from a poem of such length, “the Poem of the Sufi Way” covers many different themes and draws on many different backgrounds. As Michael Sells writes in the Preface to Umar Ibn al-Farid: Sufi Verse, Saintly Life:

“The poem of the Sufi Way” is a microcosm of Islamic tradition at the time of Ibn al-Farid. A preliminary list of central themes of the poem would include the following: the famous lovers of classical Arabic poetry; key themes and passages from the Qur'an and from the hadith, the stories of the Qur'anic prophets; the stories of the four “rightly guided” Caliphs; mystical interpretations of Qu'ranic passages and motifs that grew out of these interpretations, such as the pre-eternal covenant; worlds of esoteric science (alchemy, astrology, divination, numerology); the psychology of Sufi states of altered consciousness; the stations of Muhammad's mi'raj, or the mystic in his or her journey to the divine beloved; and interpretations of key mystical concepts such as fana' – the passing-away of the human self in mystical union with the divine.”

== Commentaries ==
Its importance has merited many commentaries, including ones by including al-Farghānī (d. 1300), al-Qāshānī (d. 1334), al-Qaysarī (d. 1350), Jāmī (d. 1492), al-Būrīnī (d. 1615), and al-Nābulusī (d. 1730). Once an unknown religious scholar asked the Shaykh's permission to write a commentary on “the Poem of the Sufi Way.” Ibn al-Farid asked how long the commentary would be. When the scholar replied that it would fill two volumes, Ibn al-Farid replied that he “could compose a two-volume commentary on each verse.”
