= Sudovia =

Sudovia (Lithuanian: Sūduva) can refer to:

== In geography ==
- Sudovia/Yotvingia, ancient Baltic land inhabited by Sudovians/Yotvingians
- Suvalkija, one of the five cultural regions of Lithuania
- Suwałki Region, region in Poland near the border with Lithuania

== In sport ==
- Sūduva stadium, multi-use stadium in Marijampolė, Lithuania
- FK Sūduva Marijampolė, a football club from the city of Marijampolė, Lithuania
- BC Arvi-Sūduva, a basketball club of Marijampolė, Lithuania
