= Landmeister in Livland =

High office in the Teutonic Order

Seal of Landmaster of the Teutonic Order in Livonia

Landmeister in Livland was a high office in the Teutonic Order. The Landmeister administered the province of the State of the Teutonic Order in Livonia (formally known as the Mastery of Livland, Meistertum Livland). The area of the province had belonged to the former crusading order of the Livonian Brothers of the Sword until 1237, when the remnants of the crusader order were incorporated into the Teutonic Order.

The seat of the Landmeister was the castle of Wenden. The Landmaster's office existed in Livonia until 1561, when in the wake of the Livonian War the last Landmeister Gotthard Kettler relinquished the northern parts of the Livonian Mastery and in the Union of Vilna secularized the part still left to him and, as the Duchy of Courland and Semigallia, took fief from the Polish king and Grand Duke of Lithuania Sigismund II Augustus. The non-recognition of this act by Pope, Holy Roman Empire and the Grand Master of the Teutonic Order had no factual effect.

== History ==
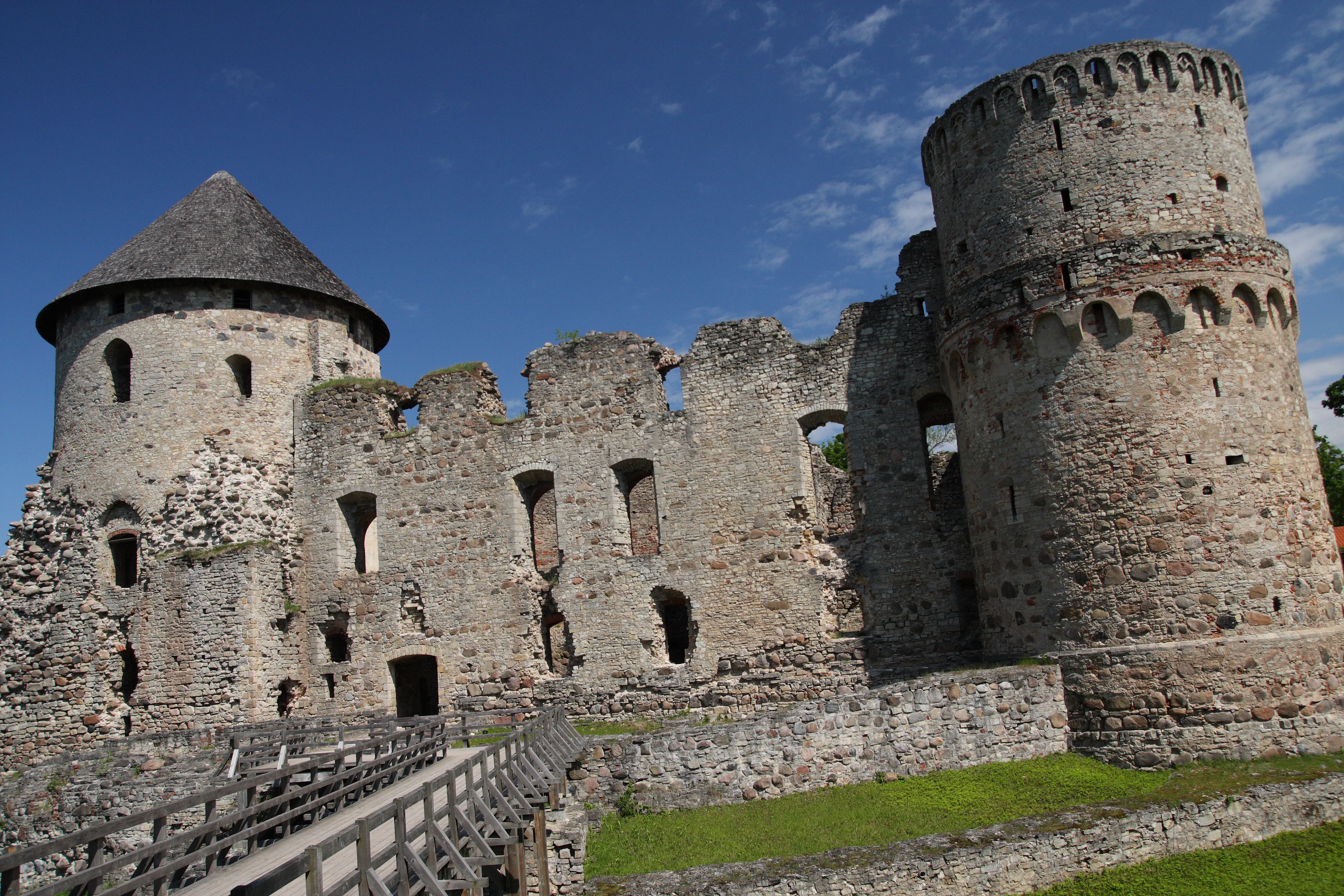
Wenden castle was the seat of Livland Landmeister.

After the demise of the Order of the Sword Brothers in the 1236 Battle of Saule, the crusader order ceased to exist and, with the Pope's permission, in 1237, the surviving sword brothers and their property were incorporated into the Teutonic Order. The Teutonic Landmeister of Prussia, Hermann Balk also became the first person to hold the new office of Landmeister in Livland.

Until the mid-14th century the Landmeisters were nominated by the Grand Master of the Teutonic Order. However, due to the geographical distance between Livonia and Prussia, as well as regional peculiarities in governing the country, in the following centuries, the Landmeister was elected by the Livonian General Chapter and typically only "confirmed" by the Grand Master, and the Landmeister always maintained a significant degree of autonomy within the State of the Teutonic Order, even from 1309 to 1525, when the seat of the Grand Master was located in Marienburg or Königsberg.

In addition came the different origin of the cadres of the both branches of the Order: while in Prussia predominantly Central and West German warrior monks ruled, the core of the Livonian branch recruited predominantly from North German and Danish knights. This reflected the country's attachment to the traditions of forcible proselytizing of Livonians and Estonians at the beginning of the 13th century: Christianity spread in the northern Baltic through pre-Hanseatic sea connections from bases such as Lübeck and the Danish Zealand.

Coordinated activities of both branches in the war against the Grand Duchy of Lithuania remained the exception in view of this constellation. An outstanding example is the absence of the entire Livonian Meistertum in the decisive campaign of 1410, which led to the catastrophe in the Battle of Tannenberg. The Livonian Landmeister Conrad von Vytinghove relied on a truce agreed with the Lithuanian Grand Duke Vytautas.

Wolter von Plettenberg was the Landmeister in Livonia 1494-1535. In 1503, his troops won a famous victory over the invading army of Ivan III of Russia. Plettenberg is remembered for his pragmatic approach to the introduction of the Reformation in Livonia. Plettenberg himself, like his successors until 1561, remained Catholic even after the Reformation, yet under his leadership the Reformation prevailed in Livonia among the entire local population of Germans, Estonians and Latvians. The Protestant faith has survived to this day in Estonia and Latvia.

== See also ==
- List of Landmeisters in Livland
- Landmeister of Prussia

== Literature ==
- Peter of Dusburg: Chronicon Terrae Prussiae (c. 1326).
- Nikolaus von Jeroschin: Di Kronike of Pruzinlant (transfer of Chronicon Terrae Prussae into East German with additions, around 1340).
- Hermann von Wartberge: Chronicon Livoniae (around 1378)
- Wigand von Marburg: Chronicon Livoniae (around 1378)
