= Ibn al-Farid =

Arab poet and Scholar (1181–1234)

- عمر بن علي بن الفارض
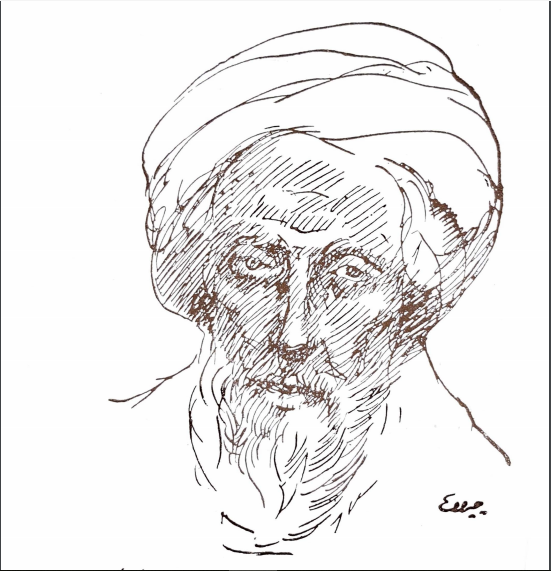
- Born: ʿUmar ibn ʿAlī ibn al-Fāriḍ 22 March 1181; Cairo, Ayyubid Egypt, now Egypt
- Died: 1235 (aged 54-55); Al-Azhar Mosque, Cairo, Ayyubid Sultanate, now Egypt
- Resting place: Mokattam Hills, now City of the Dead (Cairo) southeastern Cairo, Egypt
- Occupations: Arabic poet, writer, philosopher
- Writing career
- Notable work: Dīwān Ibn al-Fāriḍ دیوان ابن الفارض

Ibn al-Farid or Ibn Farid; (Arabic: عمر بن علي بن الفارض, ʿUmar ibn ʿAlī ibn al-Fāriḍ) (22 March 1181 – 1234) was an Arab poet as well as a Sufi waliullah. His name is Arabic for "son of the obligator" (the one who divides the inheritance between the inheritors), as his father was well regarded for his work in the legal sphere. He was born in Cairo to parents from Hama in modern Syria, lived for some time in Mecca, and died in Cairo. His poetry is full of Sufi inspiration and imagery, and he was esteemed as the greatest mystic poet of the Arabs. Some of his poems are said to have been written in ecstasies.

Ibn al-Fāriḍ was arguably the most celebrated Sufi poet in the pre-modern Islamic world, with his poetry admired across both Arabic and Persian speaking regions. The Persian poet Jami is known to have written a commentary on Ibn al-Fāriḍ's poems, and Sa'id al-Din Farghani also authored a Persian commentary on his work

== Biography ==
Ibn al-Farid's father moved from his native town, Hama in Syria, to Cairo where Umar was born. Some sources say that his father was a respected farid (an advocate for women's causes) and others say that his profession was the allocation of shares (furūḍ) in cases of inheritance. These two can be reconciled, however, by interpreting his name to mean that he often represented women in cases of inheritance. Whichever is the case, Ibn al-Farid's father was a knowledgeable scholar and gave his son a good foundation in belles lettres.

When he was a young man Ibn al-Farid would go on extended spiritual retreats among the oases, specifically the Oasis of the Wretches (Wadi al-Mustad'afin), outside Cairo, but he eventually felt that he was not making deep enough spiritual progress. He abandoned his spiritual wanderings and enrolled in a madrasa studying in the Shafi'i school of law.

One day Ibn al-Farid saw a greengrocer performing the ritual Muslim ablutions outside the door of the madrasa, but the man was doing them out of the prescribed order. When Ibn al-Farid tried to correct him, the greengrocer looked at him and said, "Umar! You will not be enlightened in Egypt. You will be enlightened only in the Hijaz, in Mecca…"

Umar Ibn al-Farid was stunned by this statement, seeing that this simple greengrocer was no ordinary man. But he argued that he couldn't possibly make the trip to Mecca right away. Then the man gave Ibn al-Farid a vision, in that very moment, of Mecca. Ibn al-Farid was so transfixed by this experience that he left immediately for Mecca and, in his own words, "Then as I entered it, enlightenment came to me wave after wave and never left".

Shaykh Umar Ibn al-Farid stayed in Mecca for fifteen years, but eventually returned to Cairo because he heard the same greengrocer calling him back to attend his funeral. Upon his return he found the greengrocer on the point of death, and they wished each other farewell.

Upon Ibn al-Farid's return to Cairo, he was treated as a saint. He would hold teaching sessions with judges, viziers and other leaders of the city. While walking down the street, people would come up to him and crowd around him, seeking spiritual blessings (barakah) and try to kiss his hand (he would respond by shaking their hand). Ibn al-Farid became a scholar of Muslim law, a teacher of the hadith (the traditions surrounding the sayings and life of Muhammad), and a teacher of poetry.

Unlike many other respected poets of the day such as Ibn Sana al-Mulk, Ibn Unayn, Baha al-Din Zuhayr and Ibn Matruh, Ibn al-Farid refused the patronage of wealthy governmental figures which would have required him to produce poetry for propaganda, preferring the relatively humble life of a teacher that allowed him to compose his poetry of enlightenment unhampered. One time al-Malik al-Kamil, who was the Ayyubid sultan at that time, liked some of his odes so much that he sent the poet an exorbitant amount of money and offered to build a shrine for him. Ibn al-Farid declined both the money and the offer of the shrine, choosing to trust in God to supply for his needs. His position as a teacher at the Al-Azhar Mosque allowed him to provide for his family, which included three children.

=== Death and Burial ===
Ibn al-Farid died in the Al-Azhar Mosque. He was buried in Qarafah cemetery at the foot of Mt. Muqqattam under the al-Arid mosque. The burial was postponed because the grave was not completely dug. Some said this was to "chastise him for claiming such a high status in love" while others said it was "merely the last indignity that one of God's chosen must suffer from the contingencies of the world below".

== Ecstasies ==
During the later part of his life, Ibn al-farid was known to enter into spiritual raptures known as jadhabat in Arabic, a common occurrence in sufism.

Normally described as being handsome, his son wrote that when a mystical state overcame him, his face would increase in beauty and brightness. Sweat would pour from his body and collect at the ground beneath his feet, which was a result of jumping and dancing. He would also take forty-day fasts, during which he would neither eat, drink nor sleep.

During one particular ecstasy, the Shaykh screamed out and danced in the middle of the market bazaar. Others in the market began to join in and dance with them, causing a commotion with some of them falling on the ground. Ibn al-Farid threw off all of his clothes, an act which members of the crowd repeated. The crowd carried the Shaykh in his underwear to the al-Azhar mosque where he remained in this state for some days afterward.

Ibn al-Farid claimed to see many things happen that could be considered to be out of this world. He wrote of a lion kneeling down to him and asking him to ride. He also wrote of seeing a man descending a mountain, floating without using his feet. He claimed that a "great green bird" came down at the funeral of the greengrocer and "gobbled up his corpse". He also claimed to have conversed with Muhammad in a dream.

Ibn al-Farid's son Kamal al-Din Muhammad described his ecstasies or trances as sometimes lasting ten consecutive days without eating, drinking, moving, speaking or hearing outside noises. He would alternately stand, sit, lie on his side, and "throw himself down on his side." When he came to, his first words would be a dictation of the verse God had given him.

== Legacy ==
Every Friday, Cairenes gather at Ibn al-Farid's tomb to listen to readings of his poems. There was once a Sufi order in Egypt in the sixteenth century C.E. called "al-Fāriḍīyah". It supposedly originated from ibn al-Farid, but is no longer in existence. Due to the subject matter of his poems and the beauty of the verse, Ibn al-Farid later became referred to as "sultan al-ashiqin" ("the sultan of lovers").

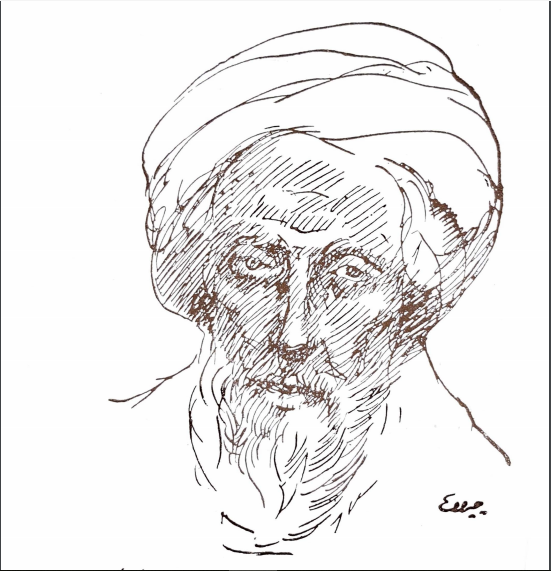
1917 sketch by Khalil Gibran

=== Art ===
Ibn al-Farid was depicted in art, notably in a sketch by Khalil Gibran made in 1917.

=== Moulid of Ibn al-Farid ===
There is a moulid of Ibn al-Farid. It begins with a procession starting in Cairo that travels through Mamluk graveyards known as the "City of the Dead" and ends at Ibn al-Farid's tomb which lies at the base of Mount al-Muqaṭṭam in the sandstone hill area of the Eastern part of Cairo. The moulid continues for two more days of meditations, prayers and dancing. During the procession, some men put skewers through their cheeks. It does not appear that Ibn al-Farid practiced this; the origination of the tradition is unknown. It is said though that the spirit of Ibn al-Farid protects the men who do this. The trance-like aspect of the dancing and the procession are connections to Sufi background of Ibn al-Farid. This is one of the smaller moulids in Cairo and is not widely known about among Cairenes; the average participation is a few hundred.
