= Baldwin of Alna =

Roman Catholic bishop (d. 1243)

Baldwin of Alna (German: Baldwin von Alna or Alva; French: Baudoin d’Aulne; died in 1243) was an envoy and later a papal legate of Pope Gregory IX in the Baltic region. He played a diplomatic role in both the Northern Crusades and the Barons' Crusade. He was a monk of Aulne Abbey, a Cistercian monastery in the Bishopric of Liège.

== Life ==
=== In Livonia ===
In 1230, Baldwin was appointed by cardinal Otto of Tonengo of San Nicola in Carcere as the pope's envoy to the Archbishopric of Riga, tasked to settle disagreements arising after the death of Bishop Albert of Riga (von Buxhövden) in January 1229. Baldwin arrived in Riga in July 1230. The disagreement was between Albert Suerbeer, appointed by prince-archbishop Gerhard of Bremen and Hamburg, and Nicholas of Nauen, appointed by the cathedral chapter of Riga. By October 1230, Otto decided in favour of Nicholas, who arrived in Riga in summer 1231.

Baldwin convinced the Curonians to submit to the Bishopric of Riga in the winter of 1230–1231 in exchange for food aid addressing the famine in Livonia and Novgorod; due to disputes over the division and baptism of Courland, he had to flee to the monastery of Daugavgrīva (Dünamünde). In early 1232, Baldwin left Livonia. The pope appointed him Bishop of Semigallia, with authority of A Papal legation throughout much of Livonia. Baldwin returned by 1233. He set up his base in Wiek in western Estonia, and in summer 1233 demanded that the Livonian Brothers of the Sword hand over the castle of Reval (later Tallinn). The Brothers refused, and in subsequent fighting in c. August–September 1233, they defeated Baldwin, who excommunicated the Sword Brothers in retaliation.

At that point, Livonia was in two camps: Baldwin's Bishopric of Semigallia, the Bishopric of Dorpat and the late Albert of Riga's Buxhöveden family plus several monasteries, most Estonians and Curonians, and the Livonian Brothers of the Sword, Nicholas' Bishopric of Riga, and the city of Riga. Historians argued that Baldwin attempted to make the whole Baltic region an ecclesiastical state, but Manfred Hellmann (1993) rejected this idea as "fanciful speculation". Papal correspondence with Baldwin was primarily concerned with ending the conflict in Livonia on terms favourable to Rome, rather than conquering part of Pskov and Novgorod. No Livonian faction was allowed to ally with an external power to prevent the internal conflict from spilling over and threatening Livonia's external security.

In 1234, the pope called Baldwin to Rome, and sent his new envoy William of Modena, who arrived in Livonia by August 1234.

=== In Thrace ===
In 1239, Baldwin accompanied Baudouin de Courtenay in the Barons' Crusade and took over the responsibilities of the archbishop of Vizia in Thrace, in the Latin Empire.

== See also ==
- Christian of Oliva

== Bibliography ==
- Selart, Anti (2015). "Chapter 3: Livonia and Rus' in the 1230s and 1240s". Livonia, Rus' and the Baltic Crusades in the Thirteenth Century. Leiden/Boston: BRILL. pp. 127–170. doi:10.1163/9789004284753_005. ISBN 978-90-04-28475-3.
- Selart, Anti (2025). Personal Networks of Baldwin of Aulne, Papal Legate in Livonia. Zapiski Historyczne, 90 (2), 5−26. DOI: 10.15762/ZH.2025.11.
