= Scalovia =

Historical region in Prussia, now in Lithuania and Russia

Coordinates: 55°10′N 21°30′E

Scalovia or Skalvia (Lithuanian: Skalva, German: Sclavonia, Schalauen, Polish: Skalowia, Latin: Sclavonia, Schlavonia) was the area of Prussia originally inhabited by the now extinct Baltic tribe of Skalvians or Scalovians which according to the Chronicon terrae Prussiae of Peter of Dusburg lived to the south of the Curonians, by the lower Nemunas river, in the times around 1240.

Jodocus Hondius mentions in 1641 that in "Sclavonia liegen Ragneta, Tilsa, Renum, Liccovia, Salavia, Labia, Tapia, Vintburg, Christader, Bayria, Cestia, Norbeitia, Bensdorff / Angenburg und Dringofordt" The centre of Scalovia was supposed to be Ragnit (Ragneta)(Raganita)(Rogneta) and in the west it bordered the Curonian Lagoon as far as the town of Russ and with Samogitia up north and with Nadrovia in the south.

The origin of the name according to Prussian chronicles is derived from one of the Prussian brothers name Schalauo and resembles the name of the town Salavia.

The inhabitants can be traced back to burial grounds with cremated remains and occasional graves of horses. Judging from the diggings, Scalovians are assumed to be relative to other western Balts such as Curonians and more distantly to eastern Balts such as Latvians and Lithuanians.

The territory once inhabited by Scalovian or Schlavone people (Andreas Cellarius, 1652:132), which had been a part of Lithuania Minor, was at various times under Polish, Lithuanian, and German rule. It is now divided between Lithuania and Kaliningrad Oblast.
