= Christian of Oliva =

Bishop of Prussia (died 1245)

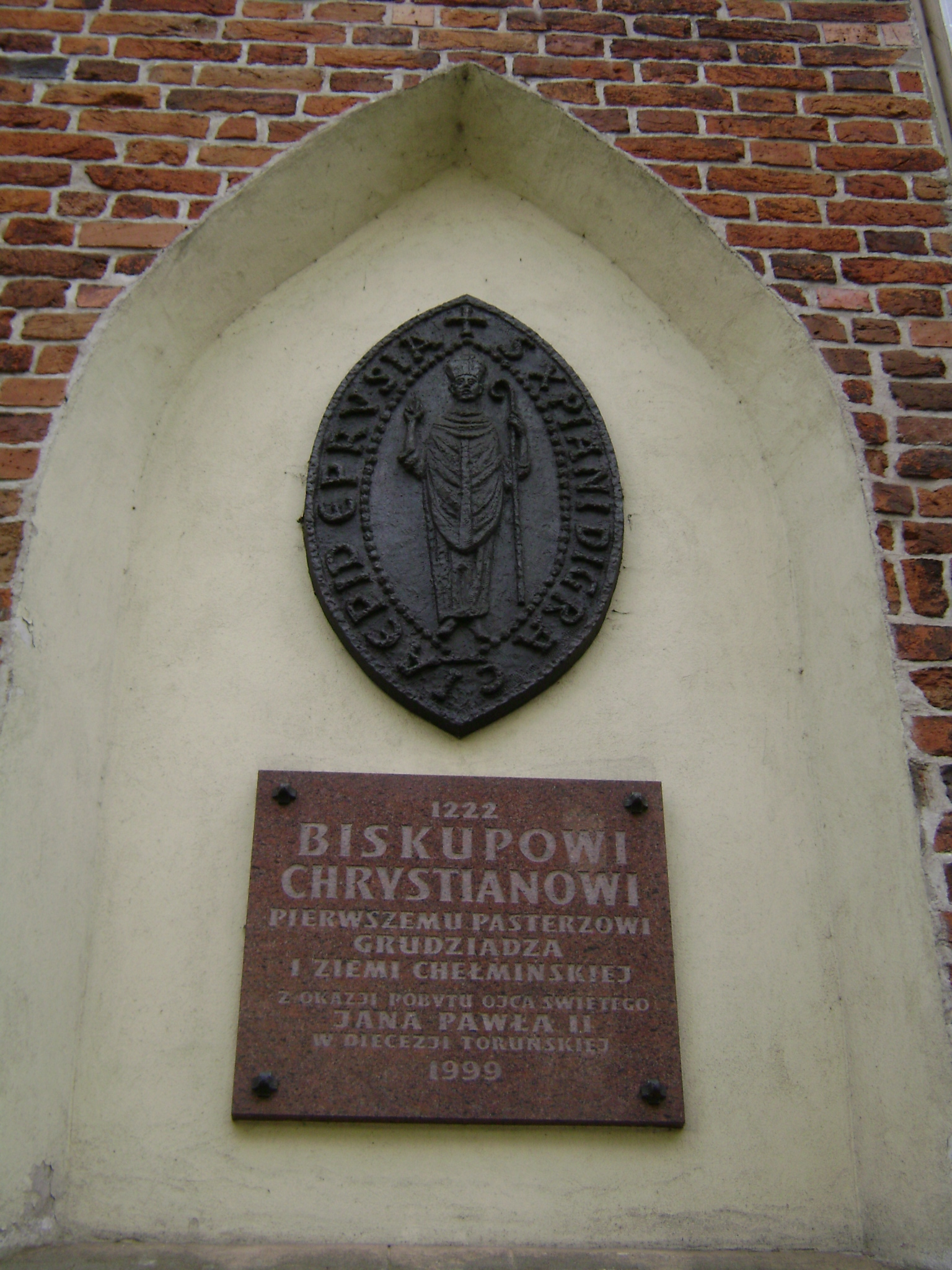
Memorial plaque of Bishop Christian at Grudziądz

Christian of Oliva (Polish: Chrystian z Oliwy), also Christian of Prussia (German: Christian von Preußen) (died 4 December(?) 1245) was the first missionary bishop of Prussia.

== History ==
Christian was born about 1180 in the Duchy of Pomerania, possibly in the area of Chociwel (according to Johannes Voigt). Probably as a juvenile he joined the Cistercian Order at newly established Kołbacz (Kolbatz) Abbey and in 1209 entered Oliwa Abbey near Gdańsk, founded in 1178 by the Samboride dukes of Pomerelia. At this time the Piast duke Konrad I of Masovia with the consent of Pope Innocent III had started the first of several unsuccessful Prussian Crusades into the adjacent Chełmno Land and Christian acted as a missionary among the Prussians east of the Vistula River.

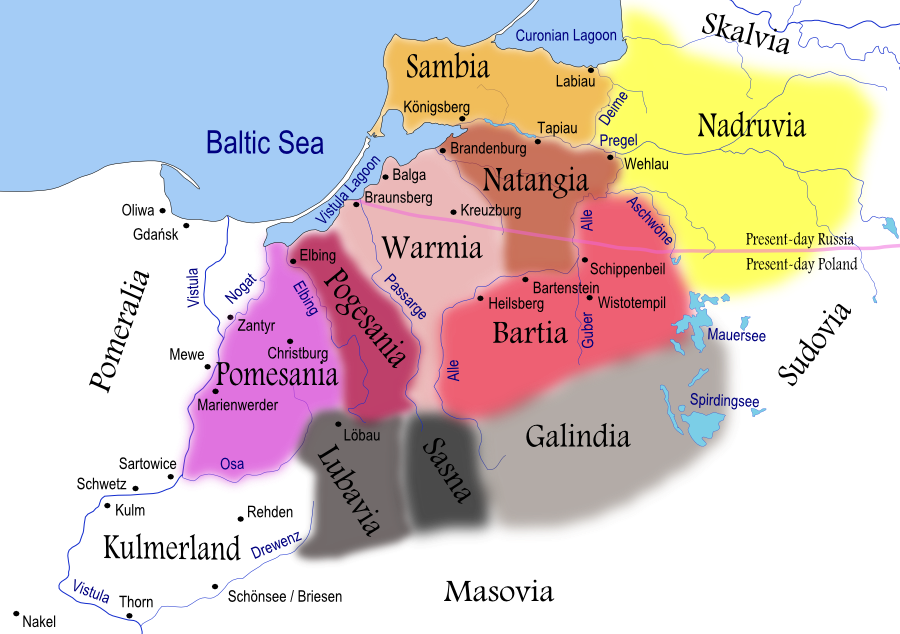
Prussian tribes in the 13th century, Chełmno Land (Kulmerland) in white

In 1209, Christian was commissioned by the Pope to be responsible for the Prussian missions between the Vistula and Neman Rivers and in 1212 he was appointed bishop. In 1215 he went to Rome in order to report to the Curia on the condition and prospects of his mission, and was consecrated first "Bishop of Prussia" at the Fourth Council of the Lateran. His seat as a bishop remained at Oliwa Abbey on the western side of the Vistula, whereas the pagan Prussian (later East Prussian) territory was on the eastern side of it.

The attempts by Konrad of Masovia to subdue the Prussian lands had led to long-term and intense border quarrels, whereby the Polish lands of Masovia, Cuyavia and even Greater Poland became subject to continuous Prussian raids. Bishop Christian asked the new Pope Honorius III for the consent to start another Crusade, however a first campaign in 1217 proved a failure and even the joint efforts by Duke Konrad with the Polish High Duke Leszek I the White and Duke Henry I the Bearded of Silesia in 1222/23 only led to the reconquest of Chełmno Land but did not stop the Prussian invasions. At least Christian was able to establish the Diocese of Chełmno east of the Vistula, adopting the episcopal rights from the Masovian Bishop of Płock, confirmed by both Duke Konrad and the Pope.

Duke Konrad of Masovia was still not capable of ending the Prussian attacks on his territory and in 1226 began to conduct negotiations with the Teutonic Knights under Grand Master Hermann von Salza in order to strengthen his forces. As von Salza initially hesitated to offer his services, Christian created the military Order of Dobrzyń (Fratres Milites Christi) in 1228; however, to little avail.

Meanwhile, von Salza had to abandon his hope to establish an Order's State in the Burzenland region of Transylvania, which had led to an éclat with King Andrew II of Hungary. He obtained a charter by Emperor Frederick II issued in the 1226 Golden Bull of Rimini, whereby Chełmno Land would be the unshared possession of the Teutonic Knights, which was confirmed by Duke Konrad of Masovia in the 1230 Treaty of Kruszwica. Christian ceded his possessions to the new State of the Teutonic Order and in turn was appointed Bishop of Chełmno the next year.

Bishop Christian continued his mission in Sambia (Samland), where from 1233 to 1239 he was held captive by pagan Prussians, and freed in trade for five other hostages who then in turn were released for a ransom of 800 Marks, granted to him by Pope Gregory IX. He had to deal with the constant cut-back of his autonomy by the Knights and asked the Roman Curia for mediation. In 1243, the Papal legate William of Modena divided the Prussian lands of the Order's State into four dioceses, whereby the bishops retained secular rule over about one-third of the diocesan territory:

- Bishopric of Chełmno (Chełmno Land, Ziemia Chełminska)
- Bishopric of Pomesania (Pomesania)
- Bishopric of Warmia (Ermland) (state)/ Diocese of Warmia (ecclesiastical ambit)
- Bishopric of Samland (Sambia)

all suffragan dioceses under the Archbishopric of Riga. Christian was supposed to choose one of them, but did not agree to the division. He possibly retired to the Cistercians Abbey in Sulejów, where he died before the conflict was solved.

== See also ==
- Baldwin of Alna
