= Baha al-Din Zuhayr =

Arabian poet

- بهاء الدين زهير
- Born: 1186
- Died: 1258; Egypt

Baha al-Din Zuhayr (Arabic: بهاء الدين زهير; 1186–1258) was an Arabian poet born at or near Mecca, and became celebrated as the best writer of prose and verse and the best calligrapher of his time.

== Life ==
He entered the service of Sultan Malik As-Salih Najm ud-Din in Mesopotamia, and was with him at Damascus until the Sultan was betrayed and imprisoned. Baha' al-din then retired to Nablus where he remained until Najm ud-Din escaped and obtained possession of Egypt, whither he accompanied him in 1240. There he remained as the Sultan's confidential secretary until his death, due to an epidemic, in 1258.

His poetry consists mostly of panegyric and brilliant occasional verse distinguished for its elegance. It has been published with English metrical translation by E. H. Palmer (2 vols., Cambridge, 1877).

His life was written by his contemporary Ibn Khallikan (see de Slane's trans. of his Biographical Dictionary, vol. i, pp. 542–545).

== Quotes ==
Spurn not the mildest man on Earth:

Who knows but someday you may need his aid?
Cloth of soft texture is of greater worth
than rougher stuff, when robes are to be made.

لا تَطَّرِح خامل الرجال فقد تَضْطَرّ يوماً الى ارادتِهِ

فاللينُ في البُرْدِ مُحْتَقَرٌ خيرٌ منَ اليُبسِ عند حاجتِهِ

(translation: E.H. Palmer, The Poetical Works of Baha Ed-Din Zuheir, 2 vols., Cambridge 1877, p. 34)
