= Dietrich von Grüningen =

Dietrich von Grüningen (or von Groeningen) (c. 1210 – 3 September 1259) was a Knights Templar, Landmeister in Livonia and Landmeister of Prussia and Deutschmeister of the Teutonic Order. One of the most outstanding figures of the Teutonic Order in the 13th century.

== Early years ==
He came from a ministerialis at Weissensee in Thuringia in the service of the Ludowinger Landgrave of Thuringia, which according to the place Grüningen (today part of Greußen) called. He probably performed on 18 November 1234 in Marburg (Lahn), together with the later Grand Master Conrad of Thuringia (1206-1240) and eight other followers of the latter, including the later one Grand Master Hartmann von Heldrungen († 1282), in the Teutonic Order. The occasion was probably the penance imposed on them for the total destruction of the city Fritzlar and the desecration of the local collegiate church two years earlier.

== History ==
As the Livonian Brothers of the Sword after his heavy defeat against the Lithuanian Samogitians in the Battle of Schaulen (22 September 1236) in the year 1237 by arbitration of the Pope Gregory IX as Livonian Order was united with the Teutonic Knights, Dietrich von Grueningen should probably be in the same year Landmeister in Livland. However, the then Grand Master Hermann von Salza looked away from it and instead used Hermann von Balk, the Landmeister of Prussia, also in Livonia, probably because Dietrich von Grüningen only a few years earlier in the Order had come and was still very young. However, Grüningen may have already acted as representative of Balk in Livland. Already in 1238, when Balk had left because of serious illness and serious disputes with the bishop of Riga, Nikolaus von Nauen, about the sovereign rights in the area of the former Livonian Brothers of the Sword, followed him Dietrich von Grüningen as land master in Livland.

Grüningen remained until 1251 Landmeister in Livonia, briefly interrupted 1241-1242 by an interim office of Andreas von Felben. However, he was often absent as an anti - Staufer religious diplomat. As early as 1245, he served as temporary deputy of the German Champion. From 1246 to 1259 he was also Landmeister of Prussia, where he followed Poppo von Osterna (1244-1246). From 1254 to 1256 he was under the Master Poppo von Osterna in personal union both Landmeister of Prussia and Deutschmeister. Grüningen completed the conquest of Kurland and built a number of castles, including Goldingen (Kuldīga) and Amboten (Embūte).

In 1254 he led an embassy of the Order to Pope Innocent IV in Rome; In doing so, he achieved that the Pope in a Papal bull the bishops of Kulm, Pomesania and Courland in support of the Order in the Christianization of the conquered landscapes Barten and Galinden. In December 1254, he concluded in the name of the Order a comparison with the Archbishop of Riga and the bishops of Bishopric of Ösel–Wiek, Courland and Dorpat, in which they are concerned about their respective claims to power in Livonia agreed. During the campaign of the king Ottokar II of Bohemia against the Prussians in Samland in the spring of 1255, Dietrich von Grüningen joined him in Elbing with a squad of knights from Kulm and the Warmia; Otto III, Margrave of Brandenburg.

== Literature ==
- Grüningen (Gruningen, Groningen), Dietrich von | Kurt Forstreuter | 13614621X}} * {{NDB | 7 | 200 | 200 |
- Theodor Kallmeyer (ed.): The Establishment of German Rule and Christian Faith in Courland during the Thirteenth Century (Elibron Classics Facsimile Reprint of Nicolai Kymmel, Riga, 1859). BookSurge Publishing, 2003, ISBN 1-4212-4508-6, ISBN 978-1-4212-4508-9
- Friedrich Benninghoven: The Order of the Sword Brothers. Cologne; Graz, 1965 (p. 462).
- Maciej Dorna: Bracia zakonu krzyżackiego w Prusach w latach 1228-1309 , Wydawnictwo Poznańskie, Poznań, 2004 (p. 132-141) (Polish)
- Lutz Fenske & Klaus Militzer (ed.), The Knights Brothers in the Livonian branch of the Teutonic Order, Böhlau, Cologne, 1993, ISBN 3-412-06593-5, ISBN 978-3-412-06593-5 ( pp. 277–279)
- (in German) The Pomeranian noble family of Grueningen
- (in German) Friedrich Wachtsmuth (1878). Ueber die Quellen und den Verfasser der ältern livländischen Reimchronik.
- (in German) Willigis Eckermann (1848). Lehrbuch der Religionsgeschichte und Mythologie der Vorzüglichsten Völker des Alterthums.
