= William of Modena =

Italian clergyman (c. 1184–1251)

His Eminence William of Modena O.Carth.
- Cardinal-Bishop of Sabina
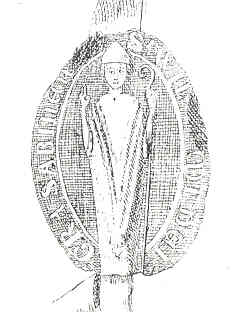
- Seal of William of Modena
- Church: Catholic Church
- Appointed: 28 May 1244
- Term ended: 31 March 1251
- Predecessor: Goffredo da Castiglione
- Successor: Pierre de Bar
- Previous posts: Bishop of Modena (1222-1233)

Orders
- Consecration: 1221
- Created cardinal: 28 May 1244 by Pope Innocent IV
- Rank: Cardinal-Bishop

Personal details
- Born: c. 1184 Piedmont, Italy
- Died: 31 March 1251 (aged 66–67) Lyon, France
- Buried: Église Notre-Dame-de-Confort

William of Modena (c. 1184 – 31 March 1251), also known as William of Sabina, Guglielmo de Chartreaux, Guglielmo de Savoy, Guillelmus, was an Italian clergyman and papal diplomat. He was frequently appointed a legate, or papal ambassador by the popes Honorius III and Gregory IX, especially in Livonia in the 1220s and in the Prussian questions of the 1240s. Eventually he resigned his see to devote himself to these diplomatic issues. On 28 May 1244 he was created Cardinal-Bishop of Sabina by Pope Innocent IV. For a short time (1219–1222) he served also as Vice-Chancellor of the Holy Roman Church.

== In Livonia ==
Born in Piedmont and named bishop of Modena in May 1222, William was sent as Papal legate to resolve differences that resulted from the outcome of the Livonian Crusade in Livonia in 1225. The Prince Bishop Albert and the semi-monastic military Order, the Livonian Brothers of the Sword, the Teutonic crusaders and the Russians, all had claims, which were made more difficult by language barriers. William soon earned the confidence of all sides, arranging diplomatic compromises on boundaries, overlapping ecclesiastical and territorial jurisdictions, taxes, coinage, and other subjects, but he could not resolve the basic quarrel: who was to be master in Livonia. William sought to remove Estonia from contention by placing it directly under papal control, appointing his own vice-legate as governor, and by bringing in German knights as vassals. But the vice-legate subsequently turned the land over to the Brothers of the Sword. The Chronicle of Henry of Livonia one of the greatest medieval narratives, was written probably as a report for him, giving him the history of the Church in Livonia up to his time. It relates how in 1226, in the stronghold of Tarwanpe, William of Modena successfully mediated peace between Germans, Danes and Estonians.

== Intervention for the Stedingers ==
Upon hearing of the situation in Stedingen, the Teutonic knights asked the Pope to intervene in order to avoid bloodshed. On 18 March 1234, in the letter Grandis et gravis, Gregory ordered his legate in Germany, William of Modena, to mediate the dispute between the Stedinger and the archbishop Gerhard II of Lippe. The crusaders were either unaware of the pope's decision or the archbishop chose to ignore it because the disagreement was not settled prior to the spring campaign.

== The Bishoprics of Prussia question ==
Even while William was negotiating in Livonia, the conflicts were brewing that would occupy him two decades later. In the Crusades to conquer and Christianize Prussia at swordpoint, William of Modena found himself required to mediate between the rival claims and conflicting programs of Christian, the evangelizing first Bishop of Prussia, who, if he had been more successful, would have been sainted, as an "Apostle to the Prussians," and the Knights of the Teutonic Order, to whom Christian and Duke Conrad of Masovia had pledged territorial properties. Before 1227, only Christian's own Cistercian order had assisted him in fortified eastern missions; but with the arrival of the Teutonic Knights, the Dominicans, who were favored by the order and by Pope Gregory IX, took a strong foothold in Prussia, while Christian and his Cistercians were thrown into the background. William of Modena, who had been appointed papal legate for Prussia, disregarded the rights of Christian, who had the misfortune to be captured by the pagan Prussians and held for ransom (1233–39), and proceeded in his absence to appoint another Bishop of Prussia. In 1236, Gregory IX, apparently giving up on Christian, empowered William of Modena to divide Prussia into three dioceses. The bishops for these new sees were, in accordance with the wish of the Teutonic Order, to be selected from the Dominican Order, while no provision whatsoever was made for the imprisoned Bishop Christian.

Finally, in the winter of 1239–40, Christian obtained his liberty. He was obliged to give hostages whom he afterwards ransomed for a sum stated as no less than eight hundred marks, which was granted to him by Gregory. Immediately upon his liberation, Christian complained to the pope that the Teutonic Order refused baptism to those who desired it and oppressed the newly converted. More concrete charges concerned episcopal rights that they claimed and properties they refused to restore. The confrontation had not been settled when Gregory died (22 August 1241). Christian and the Teutonic Order then agreed that two thirds of the conquered territory in Prussia should belong to the Order, to form a Teutonic Order state, and one-third to the bishop; that, moreover, the bishop should have the right to exercise ecclesiastical functions in the territory belonging to the Order.

William of Modena did not give up his plans of dividing Prussia into dioceses instead of empowering a vast territorial knightly order. He finally obtained from Pope Innocent IV permission to make a division, and on 29 July 1243, the Bishopric of Prussia was divided into four dioceses:

In 1243, the territorial possessions of the Teutonic Knights were divided into the Dioceses of Culm, Pomesania, Ermland, and Samland.

- Bishopric of Culm Culm
- Bishopric of Pomesania Pomesania
- Bishopric of Ermland Warmia (Ermland)
- Bishopric of Samland Sambia (Samland, now Kaliningrad) under the archbishopric of Riga with Visby as mother city to Riga. Both cities joined the Hanseatic League.

Christian received for his decades of apostolic labor the privilege to select for himself any one of the four new episcopal sees, a choice he refused.

== An embassy to Frederick II ==
In the meantime, William had been at Rome. When Celestine IV died after a short reign of sixteen days, the excommunicated Hohenstaufen emperor, Frederick II, was in possession of the Papal States of the Church around Rome and attempted to intimidate the cardinals into electing a pope to his own liking. The cardinals fled to Anagni and cast their votes for Sinibaldo de' Fieschi, who ascended to the papal throne as Innocent IV on 25 June 1243, after an interregnum of more than a year and a half. Innocent IV had previously been a friend of Frederick II. Immediately after the election the emperor sent messengers with congratulations and overtures of peace, which Innocent refused to receive. Two months later, he sent emissaries including Peter de Colmieu, Archbishop of Rouen, William of Modena, who had resigned his episcopal office, and Abbot William of St. Facundus as legates to the emperor at Melfi with instructions to ask him to release the prelates whom he had captured while on their way to a council that Gregory IX had intended to hold at Rome and challenge the emperor to make satisfaction for the injuries which he had inflicted upon the Church, which had caused Gregory IX to put him under the ban of excommunication. Should the emperor deny that he had done any wrong to the Church, or even assert the injustice of the Church, the legates were to propose that the decision should be left to a council of kings, prelates, and temporal princes. Frederick entered into an agreement with Innocent on 31 March 1244. He promised to yield to the demands of the Curia in all essential points, to restore the States of the Church, to release the prelates, and to grant amnesty to the allies of the pope. His insincerity became apparent when he secretly incited various tumults in Rome and refused to release the imprisoned prelates.

Feeling himself hindered in his freedom of action on account of the emperor's military preponderance, and fearing for his personal safety, Innocent decided to flee Sutri in disguise for Civitavecchia and board a fleet provided by the sympathetic Genoese. During the night of 27–28 June, he made his escape to Genoa. In October, he went to Burgundy, and in December to Lyons, where he remained in exile the following six years.

He died in Lyons.

== Resting place ==
William of Modena was "buried in the church of the Dominicans" in Lyon., possibly the église Notre-Dame-de-Confort.

== See also ==
- Teutonic Order state
- Baldwin of Alna
- Christian of Oliva
- Otto of Tonengo
