= Yotvingia =

Historical region

Coordinates: 54°30′N 23°00′E

Yotvingia Sūdava Dainava
- 7th century–1442
- Baltic tribes in the 12th century, Yotvingian territory marked in darker green
- Capital: Skomandburg (c. 1260-1281)

Government
  - King: Netimeras (c. 980)
  - Duke (kuningas): Komantas (c. 1260-1281); Kantigirdas (c. 1283)
- Historical era: Middle Ages
  - Established: 7th century
  - Disestablished: 1442
Succeeded by
Trakai Voivodeship
Podlaskie Voivodeship (1513–1795)
Monastic state of the Teutonic Knights

Yotvingia (Jaćwież) in the 11th century.

Yotvingia, or Sudovia, (Note: Yotvingian: Sūdava; Lithuanian: Sūduva; Polish: Jaćwież; German: Sudauen; Russian: Ятвягия, Етвязь, from Old Russian Ятвязь (Yatvyaz); Belarusian: Яцьвезь.) was a region where the Baltic tribe known as Yotvingians lived. It was located in the area of Sudovia and Dainava; south west from the upper Nemunas, between Marijampolė, Merkinė (Lithuania), Slonim, Kobryn (Belarus), Białystok, and Ełk (Poland).

Today this area corresponds mostly to the Podlaskie Voivodeship of Poland, Marijampolė County of Lithuania and a part of Hrodna Province and Brest Province of Belarus.

== History ==
The treaty of 944 between Kievan prince Igor and the Byzantine Empire has the names of many Rus' ambassadors, one of which was Jatviag Gunarev. It is also the first written documentation of the term Jatviag, or Yatviag.

The southern part of the Yotvingian lands, Sudovia and Galindia, were subdued by an army of Kievan Rus', led by Vladimir I of Kiev in 983.

Netimeras, a ruler of the Yotvingians (part of Lithuanian kingdom), was converted to Christianity by Bruno of Querfurt in 1009.

When his father died in 1170, Roman the Great was bequeathed the Principality of Vladimir-in-Volhynia. He subdued the Yotvingians, and harnessed the captives instead of oxen to drag the plows on his estates.

From the 13th century, Yotvingians began raiding adjacent areas of Masovia, Lublin and Volhynia, after Konrad I of Masovia and Daniel of Galicia had invaded them.

In 1264, the Duke of Krakow, Boleslaw V the Chaste organized an expedition against Yotvingia. On 23 June 1264 the two armies met near Brańsk. The Battle of Brańsk lasted two days pitting the forces of Yotvingia, led by Kumata against the well equipped Krakovian army. The Yotvingian forces were routed in a bloody battle and their leader killed.

In the 1280s the Northern Yotvingians were partly conquered and dispersed by the Teutonic Knights; some Yotvingians then took refuge in the Duchy of Lithuania.

On 27 September 1422, the Treaty of Melno ended the Gollub War. The Treaty divided Yotvingia between the Teutonic Knights, the Kingdom of Poland and the Grand Duchy of Lithuania.

== See also ==
- Sudovian language
- Yotvingians
- Komantas of Yotvingia
- Black Ruthenia
