= Wopławki =

- Village
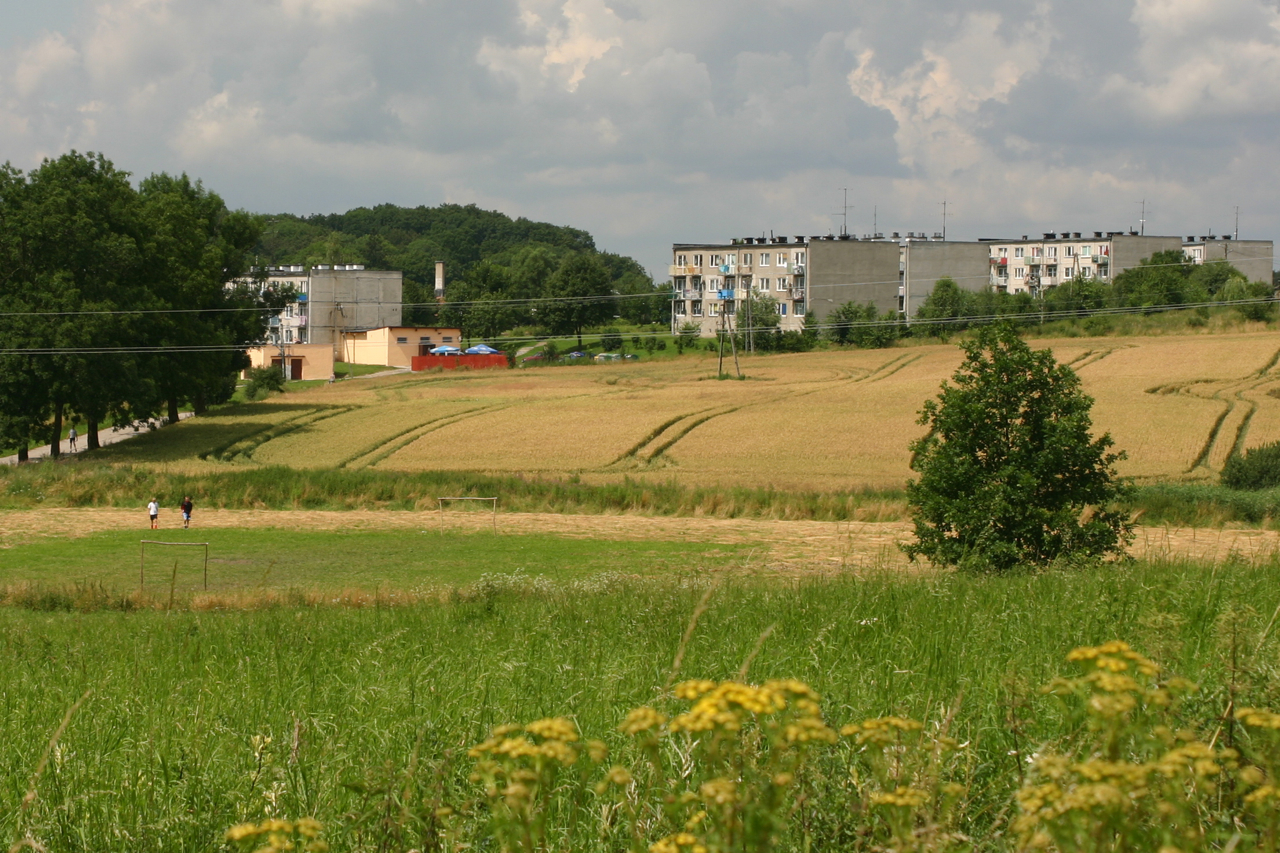

- Location within Poland
- Coordinates: 54°5′21″N 21°24′49″E
- Country: Poland
- Voivodeship: Warmian-Masurian
- County: Kętrzyn
- Gmina: Kętrzyn
- Population: 750

Wopławki [vɔˈpwafki] (German: Woplaucken) is a village in the administrative district of Gmina Kętrzyn, within Kętrzyn County, Warmian-Masurian Voivodeship, in northern Poland.
