= Komantas of Yotvingia =

Baltic duke and pagan priest

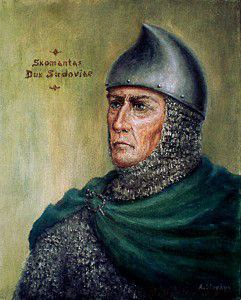
Komantas of Yotvingia

Komantas or Skomantas (known in Ruthenian sources as Komat, in Latin Koommat, in German Skomand and Skumand; ca. 1225(?) – after 1285) was a powerful duke and pagan priest of the Yotvingians, one of the early Baltic tribes (according to historian S. C. Rowell and some other researchers, this duke of Sudovia seems to be identical to Skalmantas, the supposed progenitor of Gediminas' dynasty, the Gediminids). He was at the height of his power during the 1260s and 1270s.

Skomantas is first mentioned by Peter von Dusburg during the Great Prussian Uprising (1260–1274) as a leader of the 1263 raid on Chełmno, a stronghold of the Teutonic Knights. He also led campaigns against Pinsk and other Slavic territories and therefore could not fully support the uprising. After the uprising Skomantas, with help from the Lithuanians, led 4,000 men against the Teutonic Knights. However, the Old Prussians and other Balts were losing their power. Skomantas' estate was devastated in 1280–1281 and he escaped with three sons, Rukals, Gedetes and Galms, to Black Ruthenia, controlled at that time by the Grand Duchy of Lithuania. However, he soon returned, was baptized in the Roman Catholic rite, and acknowledged the superiority of the Knights. Skomantas went on to lead armies on behalf of the Knights and was awarded lands within Prussia. His tribe lost the fight against the Knights and did not survive as an entity.
