= Pomesanians =

- Location of Pomesania on the map of Poland

Total population
- Extinct in 17th-18th century

Regions with significant populations

Languages
- Old Prussian, later also German and Polish

Religion
- Prussian mythology (Paganism)

Related ethnic groups
- Other Prussians and Balts

Pomesanians were a Prussian clan. They lived in Pomesania (Polish: Pomezania; Lithuanian: Pamedė; German: Pomesanien), a historical region in modern northern Poland, located between the Nogat and Vistula Rivers to the west and the Elbląg River to the east. It is located around the modern towns of Elbląg and Malbork. As the westernmost clan, the Pomesanians were the first of the Prussians to be conquered by the Teutonic Knights, a German military crusading order brought to the Chełmno Land to convert the pagans to Christianity. Due to Germanization and assimilation, Pomesanians became extinct some time in the 17th century.

== Etymology ==
The territory is said in folk etymology to have been named after Pomeso, a son of Widewuto, legendary chieftain of the Prussians. Georg Gerullis determined that its name was actually derived from the Old Prussian word pomedian, meaning fringe of the forest. The Lithuanian term pamedė, having the same meaning, was introduced by Kazimieras Būga.

== History ==
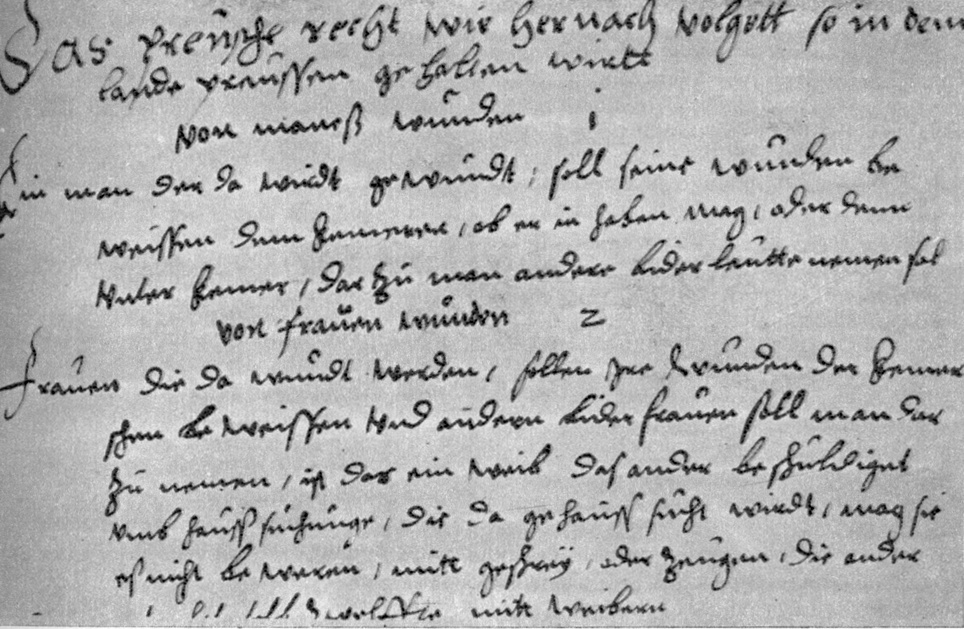
Fragment of the Pomesanian statute book of 1340. The earliest attested document of the customary law of the Balts.

The area was inhabited by Baltic people at least since the 9th century and possibly earlier. At the dawn of the 13th century the population is estimated at around 16,000–20,000. The clan, together with their neighbours the Pogesanians, made frequent raids into Masovian lands. In 1225 Duke Konrad I of Masovia asked the Teutonic Knights to protect his territory from such raids. In 1230 the Knights settled in the Chełmno Land and began the Prussian Crusade. In 1231 they crossed Vistula and built Thorn (Toruń). Pomesanian leader Pepin unsuccessfully besieged the city, but soon he was captured and tortured to death. In 1233 the work began in Marienwerder (Kwidzyn), and during the winter the Prussians gathered a large army for a major battle on the Sirgune (Dzierzgoń) River, where they suffered a great defeat. During the next three years all of Pomesania was conquered and made part of the Monastic State of the Teutonic Knights. The city of Elbing (Elbląg) was founded in 1237 by the Order near the ancient Prussian trading town of Truso.

In 1243, the Bishopric of Pomesania was established and put under the jurisdiction of the Archbishop of Riga by papal legate William of Modena. The diocese of Pomesania was later placed under the jurisdiction of the Bishop of Bydgoszcz (until 1821). Pomesanians joined the other Prussian clans during the First Prussian Uprising (1242–1249), but was the only clan not to participate in the Great Prussian Uprising (1260–1274). As the westernmost Prussian territory, it was the most exposed clan to the Polish Pomeranian, Masovian, and Kuyavian and then German colonists and their cultures. They might have been assimilated more quickly than the other Prussians.

In 1454, the region was incorporated by King Casimir IV Jagiellon to the Kingdom of Poland. The incorporation was confirmed in the Second Peace of Thorn (1466), and the region became part of the Malbork Voivodeship in the province of Royal Prussia in the large Greater Poland Province. It prospered with the grain trade from southern Poland to the royal city of Gdańsk. It then sustained ravages and plagues brought by the Swedish-Polish Wars the 17th and early 18th centuries, and was annexed by the Kingdom of Prussia as a result of the First Partition of Poland in 1772 and then combined with the newly formed Prussian province of East Prussia in 1773. With the rest of Prussia, it became a part of the German Empire during the unification of Germany in 1871. Despite the restoration of independent Poland after World War I, the Treaty of Versailles assigned the region to Germany as part of the exclave and province of East Prussia following the East Prussian plebiscite. In the 1930s, Nazi Germany conducted persecutions of the Polish community of Powiślans in the region, incl. mass arrests of Polish leaders, activists, teachers and school students. After World War II ended in 1945, Pomesania became again part of Poland according to the Potsdam Agreement. It is currently divided between the Warmian-Masurian and Pomeranian Voivodeships.
