= Landmeister of Prussia =

High office in the Teutonic Order

Landmeister of Prussia was a high office in the Teutonic Order. The Landmeister administered the land of Prussia of the Teutonic Order. It was in existence as a separate office from 1230 to 1309, later being held in union with the office of Grand Master until 1525.

== History ==
The office was created at the same time as the beginning of the conquest and the forcible Christianization of the Prussians in the summer of 1230. The first Landmeister, Hermann von Balk, received the Kulmer Land from the Duke Konrad I of Masovia as the nucleus of the Teutonic Orders in Prussia and started advancing north along the Vistula river. His successors completed the conquest of the country under considerable setbacks and established the protection of the districts and the defeat of rebellious Prussians in fortified houses, the forerunners of the later brick fortresses known as Ordensburgs. The last Landmeister of Prussia residing in Elbing was Heinrich von Plötzke. In 1309, after the death of Plötzke, the office became held in union with that of the Grand Master (held by Siegfried von Feuchtwangen residing in Marburg Castle at the time) and continued as such until 1525.

== List ==
The Landmeisters of Prussia were:

1. Hermann Balk, 1230–1239
2. Heinrich von Wida, 1239–1244
3. Poppo von Osterna, 1244–1246
4. Dietrich von Grüningen, 1246–1249
5. ?
6. Burkhard von Hornhausen, 1257–1259
7. Hartmund von Grumbach, 1259–1261
8. Helmerich von Rechenberg, 1262–1263
9. Ludwig von Baldersheim, 1263–1269
10. ?
11. Dietrich von Gattersleben, 1271–1273
12. Konrad von Thierberg the Elder, 1273–1279
13. Konrad von Feuchtwangen, 1279–1280
14. Mangold von Sternberg, 1280–1283
15. Konrad von Thierberg the Younger, 1284–1288
16. Meinhard von Querfurt, 1288–1299
17. Konrad von Babenberg, 1299
18. Ludwig von Schippen, 1299–1300
19. Helwig von Goldbach, 1300–1302
20. Konrad Sack, 1302–1306
21. Siegfried von Schwarzburg, 1306
22. Heinrich von Plötzke, 1307–1309
23. ?
24. Friedrich von Wildenberg, 1317–1324

== See also ==
- Landmeister in Livland
