= Chronicon terrae Prussiae =

1326 chronicle of the Teutonic Order

Chronicon terræ Prussiæ
- lit. 'Chronicle of the Prussian Land'
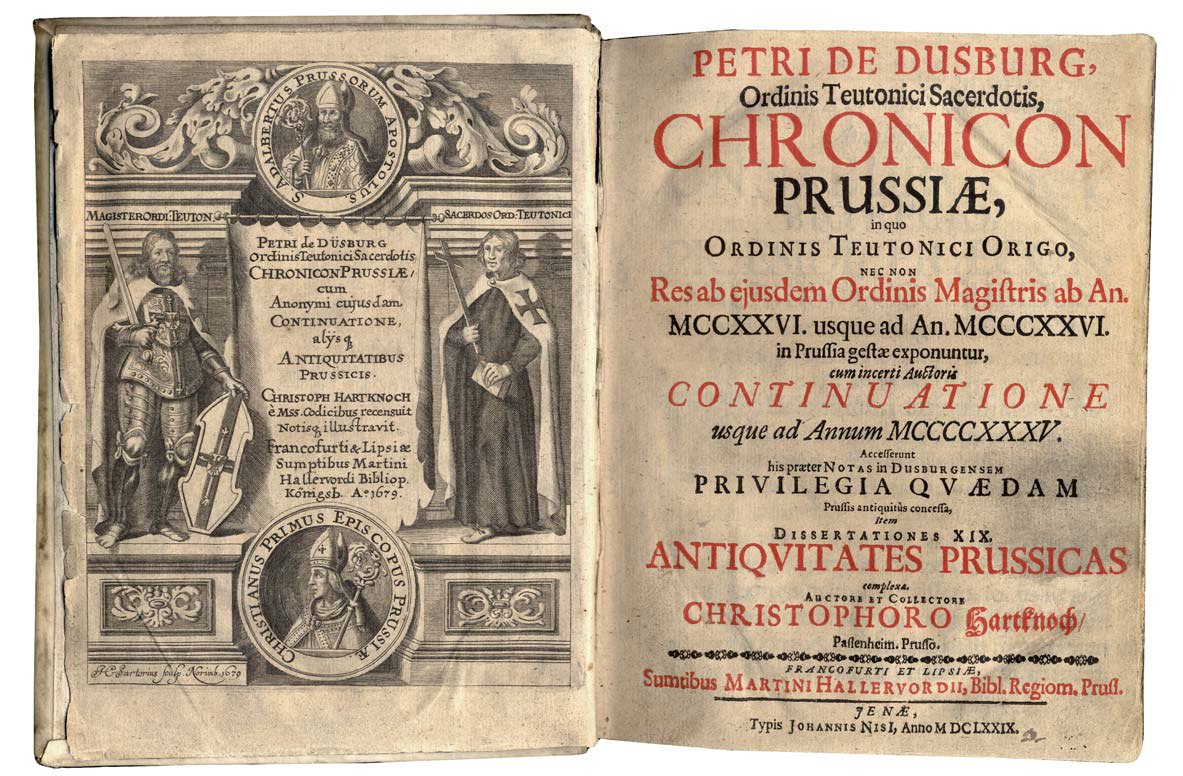
- Cover of a copy of Chronicon terræ Prussiæ from 1679
- Author(s): Peter of Dusburg
- Language: Latin
- Date: 1326
- Genre: Chronicle
- Subject: Prussian Crusade

Chronicon terræ Prussiæ (lit. 'Chronicle of the Prussian Land') is a chronicle of the Teutonic Knights, by Peter of Dusburg, finished in 1326. The manuscript is the first major chronicle of the Teutonic Order in Prussia and the Grand Duchy of Lithuania, completed some 100 years after the conquest of the crusaders into the Baltic region. It is a major source for information on the Order's battles with Old Prussians and Lithuanians.

== Contents and reliability ==
The chronicle is written in Latin and consists of four volumes. The first volume gives the background of the Order and its crusades in Outremer. The second volume narrates how the Order arrived to the Prussian land, while the third volume details wars with Old Prussians and other Baltic tribes. The fourth volume provides a historical context of other contemporary events in the world. The chronicle has an addendum of another 20 chapters dealing with events of 1326-1330, which may also have been written by Peter of Dusburg.

The chronicle is based on local monastery annals, chronicles, reports and narrations which Peter "considered reliable". Peter had access to the Grand Masters' archive in Marienburg, and witnessed some events himself.

The chronicle contains some ethnographic data about the Old Prussians, the indigenous people conquered by the Order. It provides numerous chapters in the styles of religious visions, miracles, and hagiography, aimed at the glorification of the mission of the Order. Like in the Descriptiones terrarum (1253), it writes about their tree worship: "[Prussians] had forests, fields, and sacred waters in which no one was allowed to cut down trees, plough, or fish". The war against pagans is presented as sacred, and all knights who perish go to heaven.

Peter takes no interest in domestic policy of the Order: he does not describe cities, trade, or colonization. Rather the chronicle describes minor raids and clashes with great detail.

While narratives of events and battles are considered to be mostly reliable, the chronology is sometimes wrong and the ethnographic data is ideologically charged. As a priest, Peter tried to teach the reader. Pagan Prussians and Lithuanians are presented as a moral example. They are pious in their own way, and Christians should be ashamed of their disobedient and sinful ways.

== See also ==
- Nikolaus von Jeroschin, Kronike von Pruzinlant
- Wigand of Marburg
