= Nikolaus von Jeroschin =

German chronicler (c. 1290 – 1341)

Nikolaus von Jeroschin (c. 1290 – 1341) was a 14th-century German chronicler of the Teutonic Knights in Prussia.

== Life ==
Nikolaus joined the Teutonic Order as a chaplain of the Grand Masters of the Teutonic Knights, during the time of Grand Master Gottfried von Heimberg (r. 1326 – 1329). In 1328, he translated the Vita Sancti Adalberti of Johannes Canaparius into Middle High German. From 1331–1335, he did the same for Peter of Dusburg's Chronicon terrae Prussiae on behalf of Grand Master Luther of Brunswick, translating 27,738 verses. His work is reckoned among the best of High and Late Medieval Middle High German verse.

Nikolaus's Di Kronike von Pruzinlant (The Chronicle of Prussian land) was dedicated to the patron saint of the Teutonic Knights, the Virgin Mary, and expanded upon the earlier work of Peter of Dusburg. The chronicle is more passionate than the Chronicon terrae Prussiae and was later continued by Wigand of Marburg.
