= Peter of Dusburg =

Peter of Dusburg (German: Peter von Dusburg; Latin: Petrus de Dusburg; died after 1326), also known as Peter of Duisburg, was a Priest-Brother and chronicler of the Teutonic Knights. He is known for writing the Chronicon terrae Prussiae, which described the 13th and early 14th century Teutonic Knights and Old Prussians in Prussia.

== Life ==
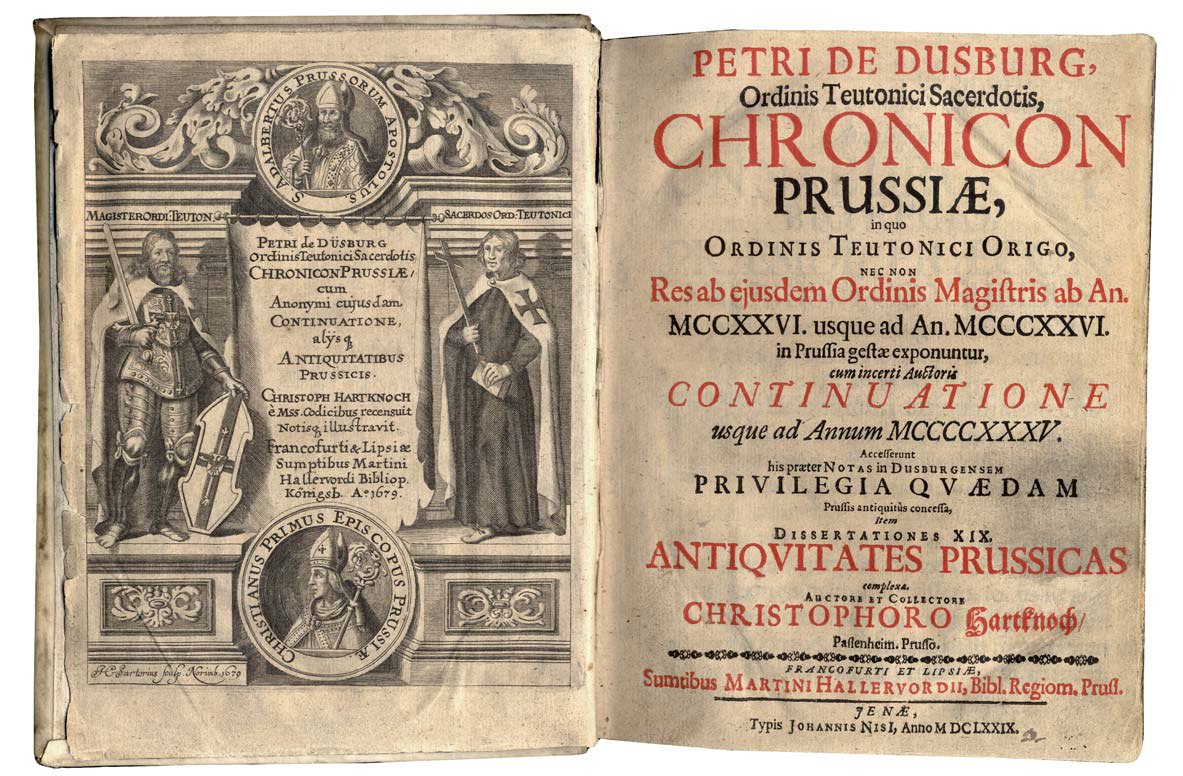
Cover of the Chronicon terrae Prussiae from the 1679 copy.

Peter's dates of birth and death are unknown, although he lived from the second half of the 13th century until the first half of the 14th century. Initially it was thought he was from Duisburg, Germany, and in some texts he is referred to as "Peter of Duisburg". Other research indicates he may have instead come from Doesburg, the Netherlands.

In 1324, probably while in Königsberg, Peter began working on his Chronicon terrae Prussiae on behalf of Grand Master Werner von Orseln. By 1326, he had finished expanding upon the now-lost work of a Latinist who had written about the campaigns of the early Prussian Crusade. That version was subsequently revised to include events up to 1330. In 1331-1335, Nikolaus von Jeroschin translated Peter's chronicle into Middle High German on behalf of Grand Master Luther von Braunschweig.

== Literature ==
- Christiansen, Erik (1997). The Northern Crusades. London: Penguin Books. p. 287. ISBN 0-14-026653-4.
