= Siege of Novogrudok =

1314 siege of the Lithuanian Crusade

- Part of the Lithuanian Crusade
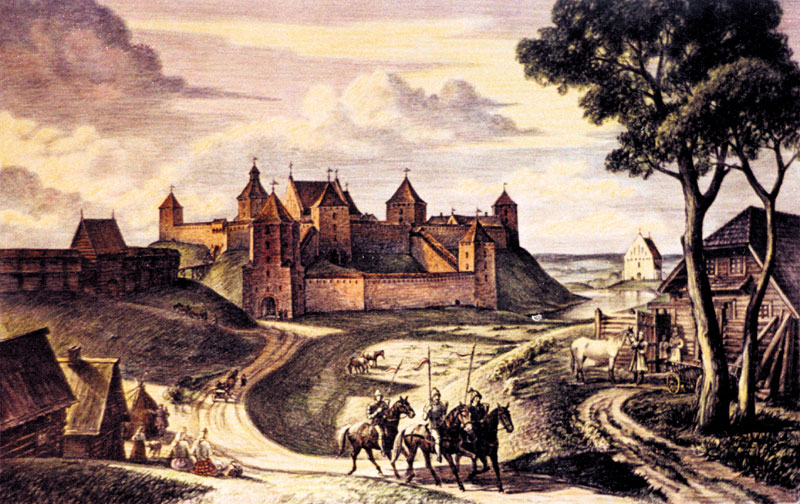
- Navahrudak Castle reconstruction by Viktor Petrovich Stashchanyuk
Date	September 1314
Location	Novogrudok, Grand Duchy of Lithuania (present-day Grodno Oblast, Belarus)
Result	Lithuanian victory

Belligerents
Teutonic Order	Grand Duchy of Lithuania

Commanders and leaders
Heinrich von Plötzke	David of Grodno

Strength
Unknown	Unknown

Casualties and losses
Most of the army: 1,500 horses	Unknown

The Siege of Novogrudok occurred as part of the broader Lithuanian Crusade of the Catholic Teutonic Order against the pagan Grand Duchy of Lithuania, between the Lithuanian city garrison supported by David of Grodno and the Teutonic Knights of Heinrich von Plötzke. It took place in September 1314, resulting in Lithuanian victory and devastating losses for the Teutonic Knights.

== Prelude ==
In 1303, former Prussian Landmeister Heinrich von Plötzke was appointed as Grand Commander of the Teutonic Order by Grand Master Gottfried von Hohenlohe. In 1314, Grand Commander Plötzke led the Teutonic Knights in a siege of the major city of Novogrudok as part of his broader campaign against the Grand Duchy of Lithuania.

== Siege ==
On September 1314, Teutonic Grand Commander Heinrich von Plötzke begun the siege of Novogrudok. The Teutonic Knights ravaged and burnt the surroundings of the city, but their initial attack on the city itself was repelled, prompting the knights to set up a camp outside the city for the prolonged assaults. During the second phase of Teutonic attacks, after they had broken into the city, Teutonic forces left their heavy cavalry behind and attempted to climb the Navahrudak Castle, but were again repelled. Some of the Teutonic Knights fell into the Lithuanian traps set up within the city.

Grodno Castellan David played a decisive role in the Teutonic retreat. David's small detachment outside the city's walls launched a devastating raid on the Teutonic camp, looting all the Teutonic provisions and equipment, subsequently forcing the Teutonic forces to abandon the siege.

== Aftermath ==
The siege resulted in Teutonic defeat, with the surviving knights abandoning their wounded and only a small portion of the Teutonic forces managing to return after a whole month. David of Grodno captured some 1,500 horses in his raid on the Teutonic camp.

In 1391 the Teutonic Knights made another attempt under Grand Master Konrad von Wallenrode to capture Novogrudok, but were repelled. In 1394, the last unsuccessful assault on the city took place under Grand Master Konrad von Jungingen and marshal Werner von Tettinger.

== See also ==
- Battle of Saule
- Battle of Grunwald
- Battle of Marienburg (1422)
