= Heinrich von Plötzke =

Officer of the Teutonic Knights

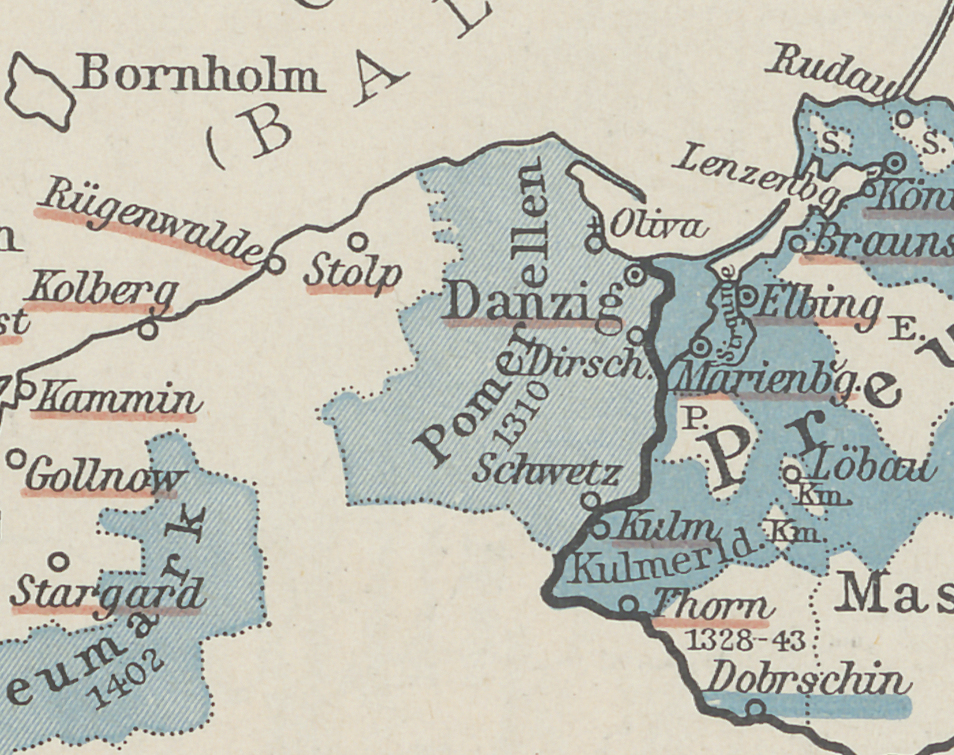
Pomerelia (Pommerellen) and Danzig while part of the monastic state of the Teutonic Knights.

Heinrich von Plötzke (c. 1264 – 27 July 1320 in Medininkai, Lithuania) was an officer of the Teutonic Order during the late 13th and early 14th centuries.

Heinrich was the Komtur of Altenburg in 1286 and of Halle in 1287, after which he was transferred to Prussia. He became the Komtur of Balga in 1294. Heinrich served as the Landmeister of Prussia from 1307–1309, and he was based in Elbing.

Hochmeister Siegfried von Feuchtwangen, Heinrich (and a relative of Gunther von Schwarzburg of the same name) led the Order's forces which relieved Brandenburg's siege of Danzig in 1308, but refused to relinquish the city to King Władysław I the Elbow-high of Poland who did not offer enough reimbursement for the Order's expenses. This led to the Teutonic takeover of Danzig. By the Treaty of Soldin of 1309, Heinrich purchased Brandenburg's claims on Pomerelia for the Order, which then held Danzig and Pomerelia until 1466. In 1314, he unsuccessfully attacked the Navahrudak Castle.

Heinrich invaded Lithuania in 1320 and was defeated. He and 29 of his knights lost their lives in the Battle of Medininkai held on 27 July 1320.

== Literature ==
- Ruslan B. Gagua The Knight of Teutonic Order Heinrich von Plotzke. — Crusader, 2016, Vol. 4, Is. (2), pp. 88–94. (in English)
- Ruslan B. Gagua The Battle of Woplawki: the Fall of Anticrusaders Campaigns of Grand Duke of Lituania Vitenes. — Crusader, 2015, Vol.(1), Is. 1, pp. 23–38. (in Russian)
