= Teutonic takeover of Danzig (Gdańsk) =

1308 event in European history

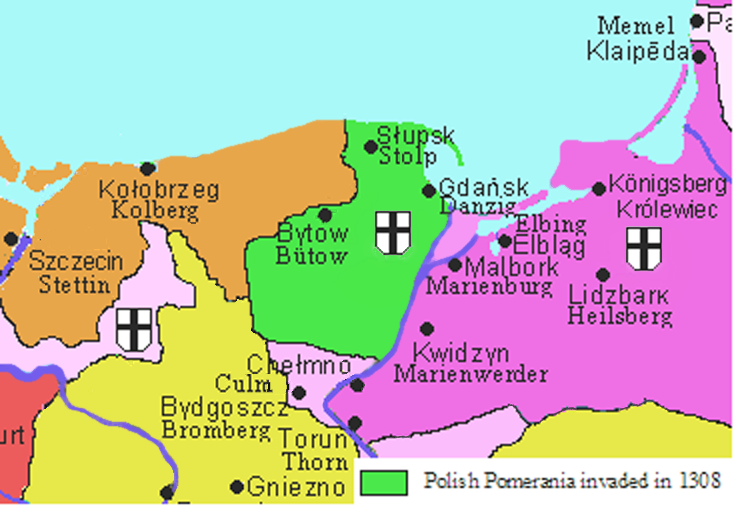
- Pomerelia (Polish Pomerania) while part of the Monastic state of the Teutonic Knights
| Date | 13 November 1308 |
| Location | Danzig (Gdańsk) |
| Result | Teutonic victory |
| Territorial changes | Pomerelia becomes a de-facto subject of the Teutonic Order and remained only nominally subject to Poland: Poland becomes landlocked from the Baltic Sea; Germanization of the region |

Belligerents
| Brandenburg margraves, Swienca family | Piast dynasty | Teutonic Knights |

Commanders and leaders
| Waldemar, Margrave of Brandenburg-Stendal | Władysław the Elbow-high, Duke of Poland | Heinrich von Plötzke |

The city of Danzig (Gdańsk) was captured by the State of the Teutonic Order on 13 November 1308, resulting in a massacre of its inhabitants and marking the beginning of tensions between Poland and the Teutonic Order. Originally the knights moved into the fortress as an ally of Poland against the Margraviate of Brandenburg. However, after disputes over the control of the city between the Order and the King of Poland arose, the knights murdered a number of citizens within the city and took it as their own. Thus the event is also known as Gdańsk massacre or Gdańsk slaughter (rzeź Gdańska). Though in the past a matter of debate among historians, a consensus has been established that many people were murdered and a considerable part of the town was destroyed in the context of the takeover.

In the aftermath of the takeover, the order seized all of Pomerelia (Gdańsk Pomerania) and bought up the supposed Brandenburgian claims to the region in the Treaty of Soldin (1309). The conflict with Poland was temporarily settled in the Treaty of Kalisz (1343). The town was returned to Poland in the Second Peace of Toruń in 1466.

== Background ==
In the 13th century, the Pomerelian duchy was ruled by members of the Samborides, originally stewards for the Polish Piast kings and dukes. The stewards asserted their power from fortified strongholds. The major stronghold of the area was at the location of present-day Gdańsk's Old Town. The adjacent town developed from a market place of tradesmen and was granted Lübeck city rights by Duke Swietopelk II in 1224.

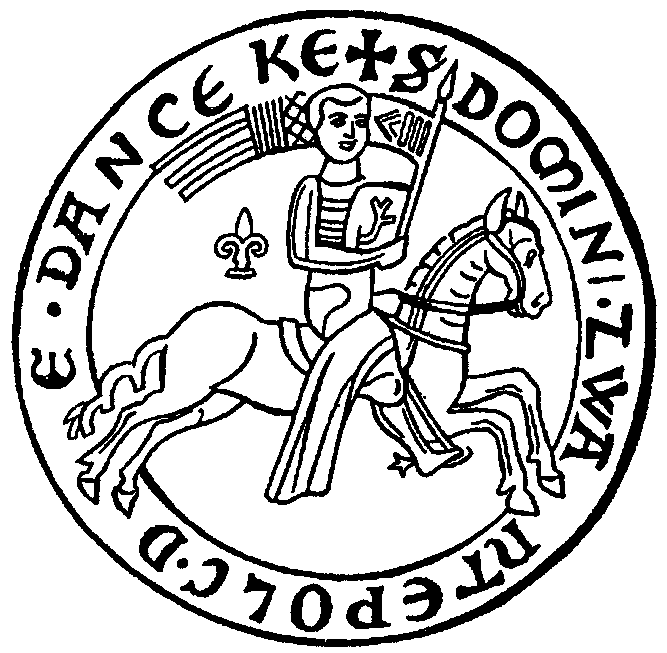
Swietopelk II, 1228

Under Swietopelk II, Gdańsk became an important trading site on the lower Vistula.

The Margraviate of Brandenburg entered the scene after Mestwin II, son of Swietopolk, concluded the Treaty of Arnswalde with them, in order to receive aid against his brother, Wartislaw. The margraves took over the town in 1270/1 from Wartislaw, but did not hand it over to Mestwin until the latter was able to force them out by concluding an alliance with Boleslaw Pobozny, duke of Greater Poland. Under the rule of Brandenburg, conflicts erupted between the Slavic and German populations, which cost many lives. In the 1282 Treaty of Kępno Mestwin II promised his Pomerelian duchy to his ally Przemysł II, duke and later king of Poland, who succeeded to the duchy after Mestwin's death in 1294.

The Margraves of Brandenburg also claimed the region and had Przemysł assassinated in early 1296. Władysław I the Elbow-high (Łokietek), Przemysł's successor, was only in loose control of Pomerelia and Gdańsk with the actual control of the area being in the hands of the local Swienca family who had come into power already under Mestwin II. In 1301, one year after Wenceslaus II of Bohemia had been crowned king of Poland, the princes of Rügen, who also claimed to be the heirs of Pomerelia, mounted an expedition. Wenceslaus, who with the Polish crown had also acquired the claim to Pomerelia, called the Teutonic Order for help. The Teutonic knights occupied Gdańsk, repelled the princes of Rügen, and left the town in 1302. While the Norwegian king Haakon backed Rügen's claims, his 1302 call to the Hanseatic cities for aid remained without answer.

Wenceslaus II died in 1305 and was succeeded by Wenceslaus III, murdered in 1306. In a treaty of 8 August 1305, the margraves of Brandenburg promised to Wenceslaus III the Meissen (Miśnia) territory in exchange for Pomerelia, but that treaty was never finalized. The Teutonic Order had inherited Gniew (Mewe) from Sambor II, thus gaining a foothold on the left bank of the Vistula. Brandenburg occupied the west of the duchy after neutralizing another claimant to the area, the Cammin bishop, by burning down his see.

=== Rebellion of 1308 and Brandenburgian siege ===
Meanwhile, Władysław I the Elbow-high had reestablished his power in Poland, but was occupied in the south of his realm. He appointed Bogusza as his Pomerelian governor in Gdańsk. In the summer of 1308, a rebellion was incited by the local Swienca family allied with Waldemar of Brandenburg, resulting in a Brandenburgian intervention which unseated the forces loyal to Łokietek, who later would become King of Poland. Bogusza and his men had retreated to the castle next to the town, and were besieged by the margraves.

Bogusza, on the advice of the Dominican prior Wilhelm, appealed to the Teutonic Knights in Prussia for assistance.

== Teutonic takeover ==
The Knights, under the leadership of Heinrich von Plotzke, agreed to aid Bogusza, and a force of 100 knights and 200 supporters, led by Günther von Schwarzburg, arrived at the castle around August.

While historians agree that the castle as well as the adjacent town were in the hands of the Teutonic Knights by late November 1308, the number of casualties and the extent of destruction is debated. Peter Oliver Loew writes that for a long time German historians accepted the version of events given by Teutonic Knights, and did not accept a high number of people murdered, with the number given between 60 and 100 victims. According to Peter Oliver Loew the exact numbers can never be established, however he agrees that all available data confirms that the city was destroyed during the conquest.

=== Ethnicity of the town's inhabitants ===
According to Peter Oliver Loew, there were German as well as Slavic inhabitants of the town. Smoliński (2021) notes that the townspeople who supported the takeover of Gdańsk in 1308 were predominantly German and adds that the townspeople and proceeding victims of the massacre and their origins and backgrounds are still in dispute among scholars. According to Hartmut Boockmann, Germans constituted the majority of the town's population. According to Śliwiński & Możejko (2017), prior to the massacre, most residents had come from the Northern German city of Lübeck. Śliwiński & Możejko (2020) add that the majority of them originally hailed from Westphalia, Lower Saxony, and the Rhineland and had previously settled in Lübeck before relocating to Gdańsk, while a minority were of Slavic (Pomeranian) origin. Loew (2024) writes that the townspeople who resisted the Teutonic Order were chiefly of German descent. According to Kazimierz Jaśinski, the Knights captured the town with the help from some of the German burghers, who constituted a very small minority within the town at the time. According to Stefan Maria Kuczyński, the German population only achieved the majority after local Polish population was murdered and a new settlement was built by Teutonic Knights.

=== Teutonic Knights entering the town ===
According to Błażej Śliwiński at the time of events, Gdańsk with surrounding settlements had around 2000 to 3000 inhabitants. The forces of the order had arrived in two columns: one re-inforced the Polish garrison in the castle, the other one marched against the town from the south and raised a siege. In the castle, conflict arose between the Teutonic and Polish knights, with the latter opposing a takeover by the former. After several encounters, the outnumbered Polish forces left the castle, with some of them defecting to the rebellious inhabitants of the town and the Brandenburgers. In the evening of 12 November 1308, the Teutonic Knights succeeded in forcing their way inside the town. During the ensuing close combat in the streets, the Teutonic Knights gained the upper hand over the defending Brandenburgian forces, burghers and Pomerelian knights. The victorious knights killed many citizens and opposing knights. By the morning of 13 November, the defendants were utterly defeated, bodies were lying in the streets and executions were going on.

According to Halina Wątróbska, half of the town was promised to the Teutonic Order in return for aiding Bogusza's men. The Teutonic Knights then moved in, defeated the Brandenburgers and had the townspeople accept Łokietek as their suzerain. However, on 13 November they "took over the whole town, thereby killing everyone who defied their will."

Udo Arnold says that a dispute between the castle's garrison and the Teutonic knights arose when the Brandenburgers were about to leave. While the dispute was about the co-ordination of further action and unsettled payment, Arnold says that it was at the same time that "the order's policy changed from providing aid towards annexing Pomerelia and buying up existing legal claims," which was opposed by the population of Danzig. This was answered by the order on 13 November "by the uncompromising levelling of the greater part of the town."

Ulrich Nieß says that as a consequence of the appearance of Teutonic Order forces in the castle, the Brandenburgers left, and soon left also the initial Pomerelian and Kuyavian garrison of the castle after a dispute with the Teutonic Knights. The town, though still preferring Brandenburg rule, offered asylum to the garrison, and in relying on its Lübeck law charter refused to allow the Teutonic Knights to enter and to follow an order to lay down its fortifications. On 13 November, the order's forces with personal involvement of Plotzke forced their way into the town, though no larger battle took place. The order then held a tribunal in the town and ordered large-scale demolishments of its buildings.

=== Massacre records ===
Soon after the takeover, on 19 June 1310, the Teutonic Knights faced charges that they had committed a massacre in a bull issued by pope Clement V: "Latest news were brought to my attention, that officials and brethren of the aforementioned Teutonic order have hostilely intruded the lands of Our beloved son Wladislaw, duke of Cracow and Sandomierz, and in the town of Gdańsk killed more than ten thousand people with the sword, inflicting death on whining infants in cradles whom even the enemy of faith would have spared." The source of the allegation is unknown. The respective bull contained other charges against the Teutonic Order, resulting from a dispute between its Livonian branch and the citizens as well as the archbishop of Riga, Friedrich von Pernstein. According to Ulrich Nieß, von Pernstein was the likely the source of the allegation of the ten thousand massacred. The bull called for an investigation of the charges which was started by Francis of Moliano in 1312. During the inquisition, Moliano excommunicated the Teutonic Knights, but this was reversed in 1313. The Riga lawsuit was finally decided in the Teutonic Order's favor by Clement's successor John XXII after a hearing in Avignon in 1319.

Under Władysław Łokietek and his successor Casimir III the Great an additional two lawsuits were filed against the order at the curia, both aiming at the return of Pomerelia. The sites of investigation were Inowrocław and Brześć Kujawski in 1320/21 and Warsaw in 1339. The judges were Domarat, bishop of Poznań, Janisław, archbishop of Gniezno and, Nikolaus (Mikolaj), abbot of Mogilno in the first case and Galhard of Chartres and Peter (Pierre) of Gervais in the second case. Witness and eyewitness reports collected during these cases include mentions of killings during the takeover of Danzig, referred to e.g. as strage magna or maxima (great (est) murder/bloodbath), while the Teutonic Order admitted the killing of 15 to 16 Pomerelian knights. The testimonies from the lawsuits and the order's responses are the primary sources used by historians to reconstruct the events.

The lawsuits did not have any practical effect on the order, who won both cases by appeal. In the 15th century, era of the Polish-Teutonic Wars, medieval Polish chronicler Jan Długosz in epic prose described the event as a slaughter of Polish nationals, regardless of condition, age or sex.

Modern sources are divided as to the actual extent of the massacre though they all agree that mass killings did take place. Historian Matthew Kuefler states: "German and Polish historians in the twentieth century tended to have diverging [views] both on the question of whether Pomerelia really "belonged" to Poland and also on the degree of ferocity of the order's conquest". The city of Gdańsk states that "The Teutonic Knights, having captured the castle in 1308 butchered the population. Since then the event is known as the Gdańsk slaughter". In many Polish works, the takeover is referred to as "Gdańsk slaughter" (rzeź Gdańska). Norman Davies in his extensive history of Poland, while not insisting on the number of 10,000 dead, says that the knights "drove Waldemar from the city, and calmly slaughtered its inhabitants", similar descriptions are presented also in some other English books with sections on Polish history. Jerzy Lukowski in "A concise history of Poland" says that the knights massacred "Lokietek's men". Błażej Śliwiński says that there was a bloodbath which cost an abundance of lives, though not 10,000, and that such massacres were common in medieval Europe., and that the term "slaughter" in Medieval Ages usually meant murder of around 1000 people.

According to Peter Oliver Loew, older German historiography was more inclined to trust the Knights' claims and argued that a number of 10,000 is virtually impossible for a medieval town. A number of 60 to 100 was regarded as reasonable. This view was shared by many Polish historians after World War II, however, Błażej Śliwiński's presented numerous pieces of evidence that what occurred was indeed a "bloodbath" with a very high number of victims, although not as high as 10,000, and more likely around 1000. Loew adds that from the source material available to historians, the definite number of casualties is impossible to establish. William Urban says that the number of 10,000 dead has been considered greater than the city's population at the time.

Kazimierz Jasiński states that the number of those killed was "not less than sixty, and not more than several hundred", that the victims were killed after the takeover rather than during it, and hence the massacre was carried out on defenseless individuals, both knights and burghers, who had laid down their arms. According to Jasiński says the 16 deaths admitted by the order were actually only the most famous Polish knights among those killed. Błażej Śliwiński (2008) estimates the number of dead between 50 and 60 knights, including 16 from notable houses, and over 1000 commoners among the city's population, which he gives as between 2,000 and 3,000 people (including surrounding settlements).

Gerard Labuda and Marian Biskup (1993) write that the number of murdered inhabitants is not established, but that the victims of the massacre include at least several dozen notable knights and members of nobility as well as significant number of commoners and simple soldiers. Biskup in a later publication from 1993 writes that victims included defenders of the castle and burghers along with members of their families in addition to 100 murdered knights. According to Maksymilian Grzegorz (1997), German historians tend to minimize the number of murdered victims of the Teutonic Knights, while Polish historians estimate the number at between at minimum 60 to several hundred.

=== Destruction of the town ===
Historians are divided on whether the townspeople after the takeover had to demolish only the city walls or, in addition, at least part of the town's buildings. Based on recent archaeological findings, Loew says that this conflict is about to be decided in favor of the destruction thesis: "burn marks and clear evidence for planation of the terrain in the early 14th century prove its [the town's] destruction in the years of 1308/09 by the Teutonic Order."

According to Ulrich Nieß, the destruction of the town was part of the order's policy of securing its lands from potential inner rivals. Nieß says that the destruction of the city walls was in line with the order's contemporary policy of not allowing their own foundations to be substantially fortified either, and that the refusal of the town to obey to the order's demand to level their walls led to a "policy of hardness" being implemented on the townspeople, who had to evacuate their houses which afterward were burned down. Nieß says that the procurator of the order had himself reported these proceedings to the pope, claiming the burghers evacuated and burned their houses voluntarily (which Nieß strongly denies). Nieß is also pointing out that in the subsequent capture of Tczew (Dirschau) by the order, the townspeople similarly had to sign an agreement to evacuate their homes, though this was not put into effect.

According to Loew, the archaeological evidence suggests that it took a couple of years before new streets and buildings were built on top of the flattened debris of the former buildings, though there probably were areas of the town which had remained unharmed. Referring to records of Danzig burghers taking residence in Lübeck, Loew says it is likely that most of the former inhabitants left Danzig in 1308.

== Aftermath ==
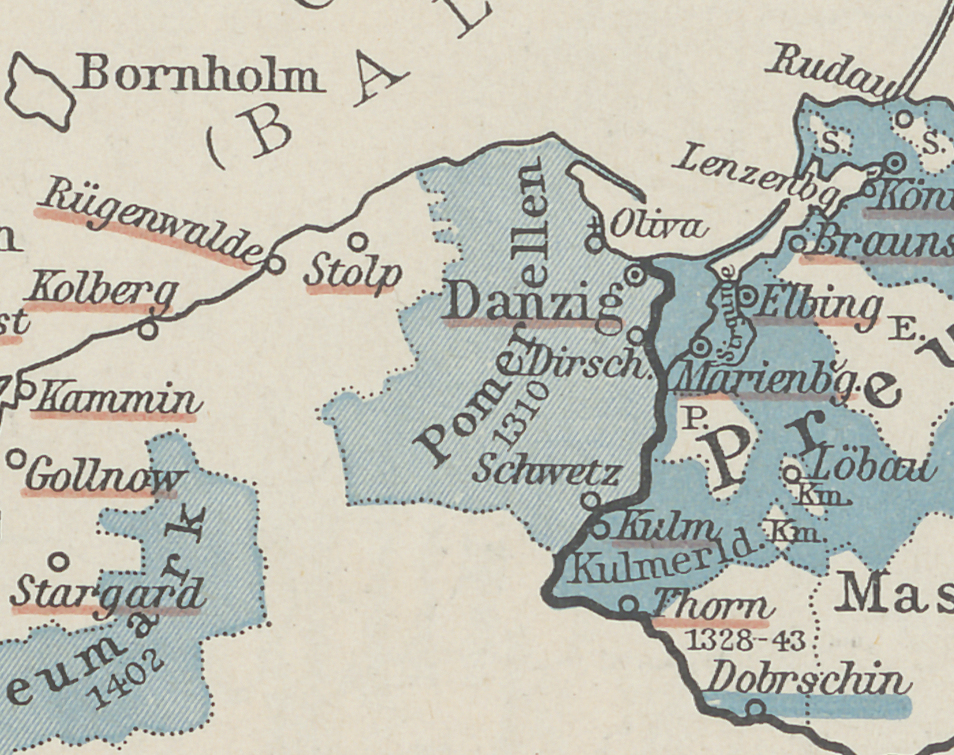
Pomerelia (Pommerellen) while part of the monastic state of the Teutonic Knights.

When the Poles refused to accept monetary compensation for the Knights' takeover of the city, the Order resorted to conquering further towns like Świecie. The local colony of merchants and artisans was specifically attacked because they competed with the Knights' town of Elbing (Elbląg), a nearby city. The Knights also attacked Tczew (Dirschau).

The Knights then captured the rest of Pomerelia from Brandenburg's troops. In September 1309, Margrave Waldemar of Brandenburg-Stendal sold his claim to the territory to the Teutonic Order for 10,000 marks in the Treaty of Soldin (now Myślibórz), thereby connecting the State of the Teutonic Order with that of the Holy Roman Empire. While for the Order, this landbridge with the empire was a major strategic improvement by connecting its Baltic territories to its German bailiwicks (ballei), it was at the same time a major loss for Poland which had become a landlocked country.

Thus, the takeover triggered a series of conflicts between Poland and the Teutonic Order, and these conflicts in turn triggered a conflict within the order itself. Some prominent brethren favoured a concession of Pomerelia in exchange for good relations with Poland, but were opposed by a majority of the knights who thought that such a concession would eventually lead to the total expulsion of the knights from their state. These disagreements caused the abdication of Grand Master Charles of Trier in 1318 and the murder of the succeeding Grand Master Werner of Orseln in 1330. The possession of Danzig and Pomerelia by the Teutonic Order was questioned consistently by the Polish kings Władysław I and Casimir the Great in legal suits in the papal court in 1320 and 1333. Both times, as well as in 1339, the Teutonic Knights were ordered by the Pope to return Pomerelia and other lands back to Poland, but did not comply. As a result, in the late 1330s, a war ensued.

Peace was established in the Treaty of Kalisz (1343); although the Polish kings were able to retain the title "Duke of Pomerania" and were recognized as titular overlords of the crusaders, the Knights retained control of Danzig. - this time, with the permission of the papal court.

Development of the city stagnated after its capture by the Teutonic Knights. Initially the new rulers tried to reduce the economic significance of Danzig by abolishing the local government and the privileges of the merchants. This was exemplified by the fact that the city council, including Arnold Hecht and Conrad Letzkau, was removed and beheaded in 1411. Later the Knights were forced to accept the fact that city defended its independence and was the largest and most important seaport of the region after overtaking Elbing. Subsequently, it flourished, benefiting from major investment and economic prosperity in the Monastic state and Poland, which stimulated trade along the Vistula. The city had become a full member of the merchant association, the Hanseatic League by 1361, but its merchants remained resentful at the barriers to trade up the Vistula river with Poland, along with the lack of political rights in a state ruled in the interest of the Order's religiously motivated knight-monks. As a result, the city became a co-founder of the Prussian Confederation which formally petitioned Casimir IV Jagiellon, to incorporate Prussia, including Danzig, into the Kingdom of Poland in 1454.

=== Lasting legacy ===
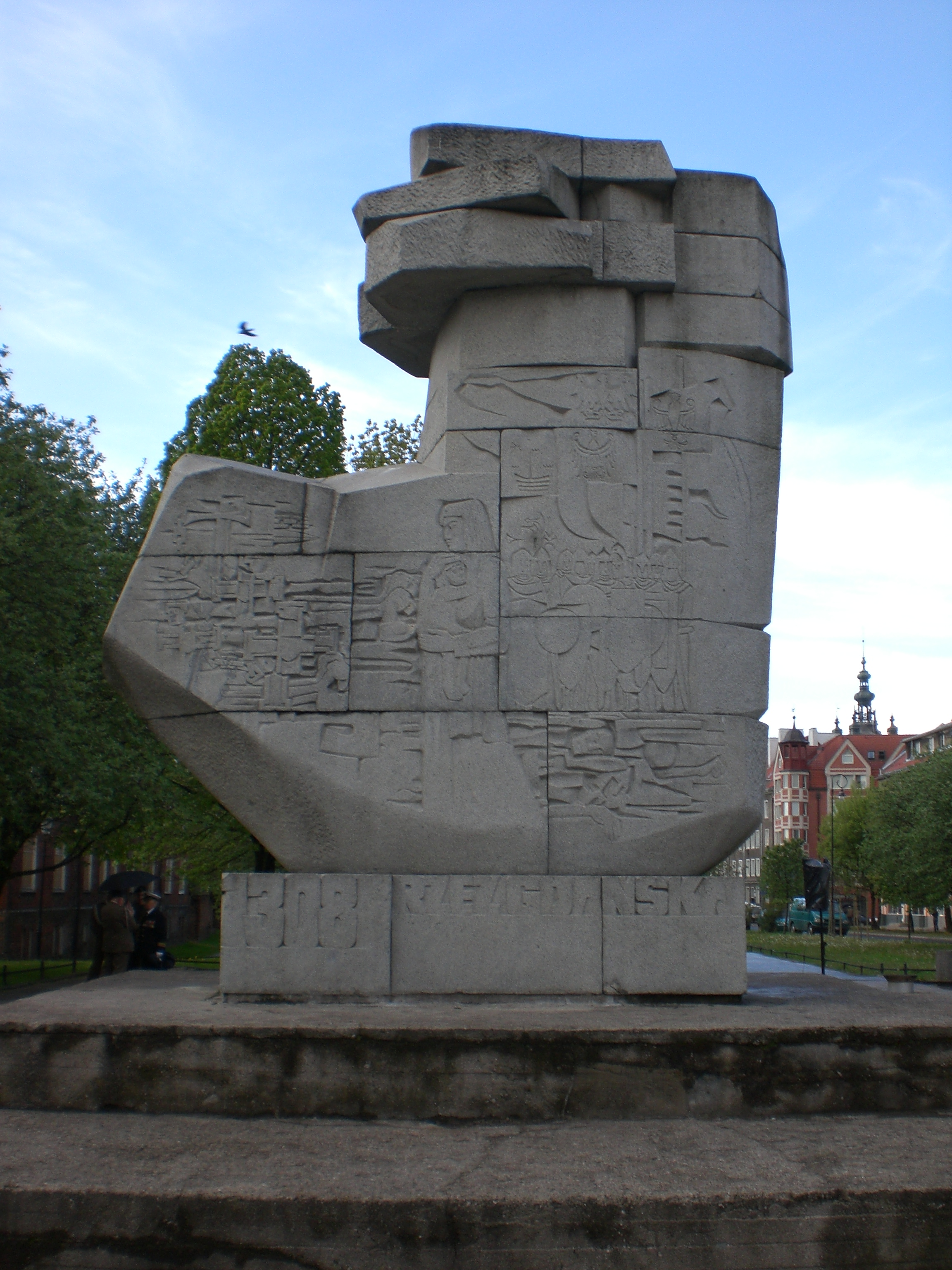
Monument in Gdańsk

When the area was disputed between Weimar Germany and the Second Polish Republic, the Poles recalled the massacre quoting the number of 10,000 murdered. After Nazi Germany had annexed the Free City of Danzig in World War II, the exiled Polish government in releases said that the knights had "massacre[d...] ten thousand souls", portrayed the contemporary Germans in the tradition of these events and linked these events with National Socialism.

In 1969, the Polish city authorities dedicated a monument that commemorates the massacre of the population of Gdańsk in 1308. Its stated aim was to propagate an analogy of the events of 1308 and the German crimes of World War II. On the monument, called Tym co za Polskość Gdańska ("For those who fought/fell/stood up for Gdansk's Polishness"), the dates 1308, 1454, 1466 and 1939 are mentioned, relating the events of 1308 to the Thirteen Years' War and World War II. According to Peter Oliver Loew "the monument is a typical product of an era in which Polish national historical narratives, cultivated since the nineteenth century, of insurrections and enduring martyrdom, of defiant pride and German-Polish enmity, all coincided with war, official antifascism, and the steady need to legitimize possession of the formerly eastern German and henceforth western Polish regions."

== See also ==
- Siege of Danzig
- History of Gdańsk
- Teutonic Order#Against Poland
- History of Pomerania#Eastern Pomerania and Poland
- Mayor Albert's Rebellion

== Primary sources ==
- Zakrzewski, I: Lites ac res gestæ inter Polonos Ordinemque cruciferorum: Causa acta anno 1320. Causa acta anno 1339. Additamentum. Posen/Poznan 1890. Digital copy hosted by CBN Polona
