= Michałów Land =

Historical region in Poland

Michałów Land Ziemia michałowska
- Historical region
- Interactive map of Michałów Land
- Coordinates: 53°12′N 19°24′E
- Country: Poland
- Time zone: UTC+1 (CET)
  - Summer (DST): UTC+2 (CEST)

Michałów Land (Polish: Ziemia michałowska, German: Michelauer Land, Latin: Terra Michaloviensis) is a historical region in central Poland, now part of the Kuyavian-Pomeranian Voivodship. During the Middle Ages, it was a disputed territory between the Kingdom of Poland and the State of the Teutonic Order.

== Name ==
It was named after Michałowo, formerly a separate settlement, now a neighbourhood of the town of Brodnica.

== Geography ==
From a geographical perspective, it was sometimes also considered part of Chełmno Land, although it is east of the river Drwęca. The land of Michałowo and Lubawa were part of Prussian territory in direct vicinity of the Chełmno Land.

== History ==
Conquered in the 11th century a territory named Masovia developed as borderland between the Prussians and Masovians, who at a time of the fragmentation of Poland had made themselves independent of the Polish rulers. The small territories of Michałowo and Lubawa were bouncing back and force in between.

The rulers of Kuyavia and Masovia had given lands to the monk and apostle of the Prussians, Christian of Oliva, He was declared first bishop of Prussia by the pope and he also bought additional territories. A Prussian chieftain had given bishop Christian his land Lubawa, by accepting Christianisation at Rome.

In 1303 the Teutonic Order state received the territory as lien and in 1317 they bought it and received all rights from the Duke of Kuyavia. Over the next few centuries, as Masovia was reabsorbed into the Kingdom of Poland, the Michałowo Land became one of the territories often contested between Poland and the Order. After the Second Peace of Toruń it was re-incorporated into Poland, as part of the Chełmno Voivodeship.

The area is mentioned in the Treaty of Lake Melno.

== See also ==
- Dobrzyń Land
