= David of Grodno =

Lithuanian noble (died 1326)

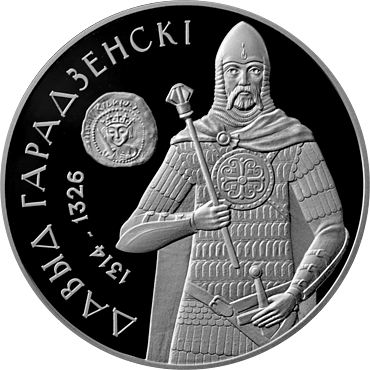
Coin of the National Bank of Belarus, dedicated to David

David (Belarusian: Давыд Гарадзенскі; Lithuanian: Dovydas Gardiniškis; died 1326) was a castellan of Grodno and one of the most famous military commanders of Gediminas, Grand Duke of Lithuania. He might have been a son of Daumantas of Pskov and great grandson of Alexander Nevsky or a son of another Lithuanian duke named Daumantas. Maciej Stryjkowski claims that David was married to one of the daughters of Gediminas. He seems to have been a middleman between the pagan Gediminas and the Christian princes of the Rurikid family and frequently led in battle the united Lithuanian–Ruthenian armies.

David is mentioned for the first time in 1314 when he helped to relieve a siege of Novogrudok by the Teutonic Order. He did not engage in battle, but instead destroyed food supplies that the Order left behind. As a result, many knights died of starvation and exhaustion on their way back to Prussia. In 1319, David was in charge of 800 men who raided Prussia as far as Łyna River. However, on their way back they were attacked by the Komtur of Tapiau (present-day Gvardeysk) and lost all booty.

Four years later, he took part in punitive expedition to Danish Estonia by Pskov. At the time, Pskov was nominally under Novgorod, which was entangled in a conflict with Tver and could not defend Pskov from the Livonian Order. In response to the looting in Ladoga and Narva provinces, David, invited by Pskovian nobles, led an expedition to Danish Estonia, an ally of the Order. In March and May 1324, the Order unsuccessfully besieged his native city.

Since the end of 1324, David was based in Grodno. In November 1324, he raided the lands of the Masovian dukes who were allied with the Teutonic Order. Later, they complained to the pope that David destroyed one city, 117 villages, and many churches and monasteries. In 1326, he led the Lithuanian armies on the raid on Brandenburg and on the way back he was traitorously killed by a Masovian knight.
