= Peter Oliver Loew =

German historian, translator, and scholar (born 1967)

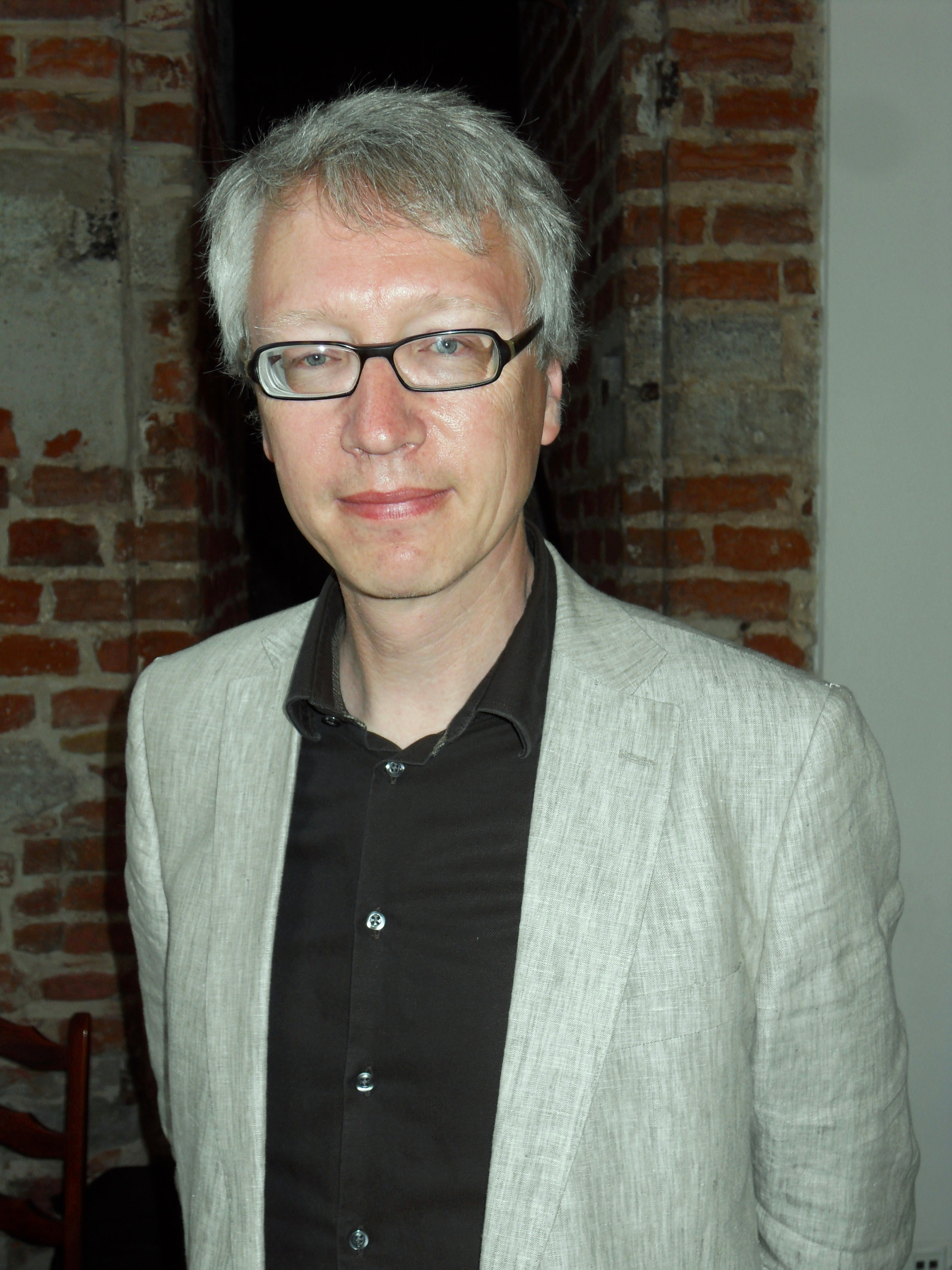
- Portrait of Loew, 2015
- Born: 1967 (age 58–59); Frankfurt am Main, Hesse, West Germany
- Occupation: Scholar

Academic background
- Education: University of Erlangen–Nuremberg; University of Freiburg; Free University of Berlin
- Thesis: (2001)

Academic work
- Discipline: History
- Sub-discipline: Local and urban history, and memory studies
- Institutions: German-Polish Institute
- Main interests: Central European history; Germany–Poland relations; Culture of Remembrance
- Website: Peter Oliver Loew publications on Academia.edu

Peter Oliver Loew (born 1967) is a German historian, translator, and scholar, specializing in the History of Poland.

== Biography ==
Loew was born in Frankfurt am Main and studied Eastern European history, Slavistics and economics at the University of Nuremberg, University of Freiburg and the Free University of Berlin. In 2001, he graduated on the historical culture of Gdańsk (Danzig) between 1793 and 1997.

He is the director of the Deutsches Polen-Institut (Darmstadt) and has been a lecturer at the University of Mainz (since 2006) and the University of Darmstadt (since 2009).

Loew specializes in the history of Polish-German relations, the History of Gdańsk, Silesia and Pomerelia.

== Publications ==
- (with Jarosław Ellwart:) Śladami Bismarcka po Pomorzu. Region, Gdynia 2001, ISBN 83-87400-60-2. German edition: Auf Bismarcks Spuren in Hinterpommern. Ein historisch-touristischer Leitfaden. Region, Gdynia 2003, ISBN 83-87400-78-5
- Danzig und seine Vergangenheit, 1793 bis 1997. Die Geschichtskultur einer Stadt zwischen Deutschland und Polen. Fibre, Osnabrück 2003, ISBN 3-929759-73-X
- (publ.:) Polen denkt Europa. Politische Texte aus zwei Jahrhunderten. Suhrkamp, Frankfurt am Main 2004, ISBN 3-518-41621-9
- Gdańsk literacki (1793–1945). Mestwin, Gdańsk 2005.
- Gdańsk. Między mitami. Borussia, Olsztyn 2006.
- Literarischer Reiseführer Danzig. Acht Stadtspaziergänge. Deutsches Kulturforum Östliches Europa, Potsdam 2009, ISBN 978-3-936168-43-3
- Das literarische Danzig 1793 bis 1945. Bausteine für eine lokale Kulturgeschichte. Peter Lang, Frankfurt am Main u.a. 2009, ISBN 978-3-631-57571-0
- Danzig. Biographie einer Stadt C.H. Beck, München 2011, ISBN 978-3-406-60587-1
  - (English trans.) Gdańsk: Portrait of a City. Oxford University Press, New York 2024, ISBN 978-0-197-60386-4
