= Navahrudak Castle =

Former castle in Navahrudak, Belarus

Coordinates: 53°36′5.25″N 25°49′39.77″E

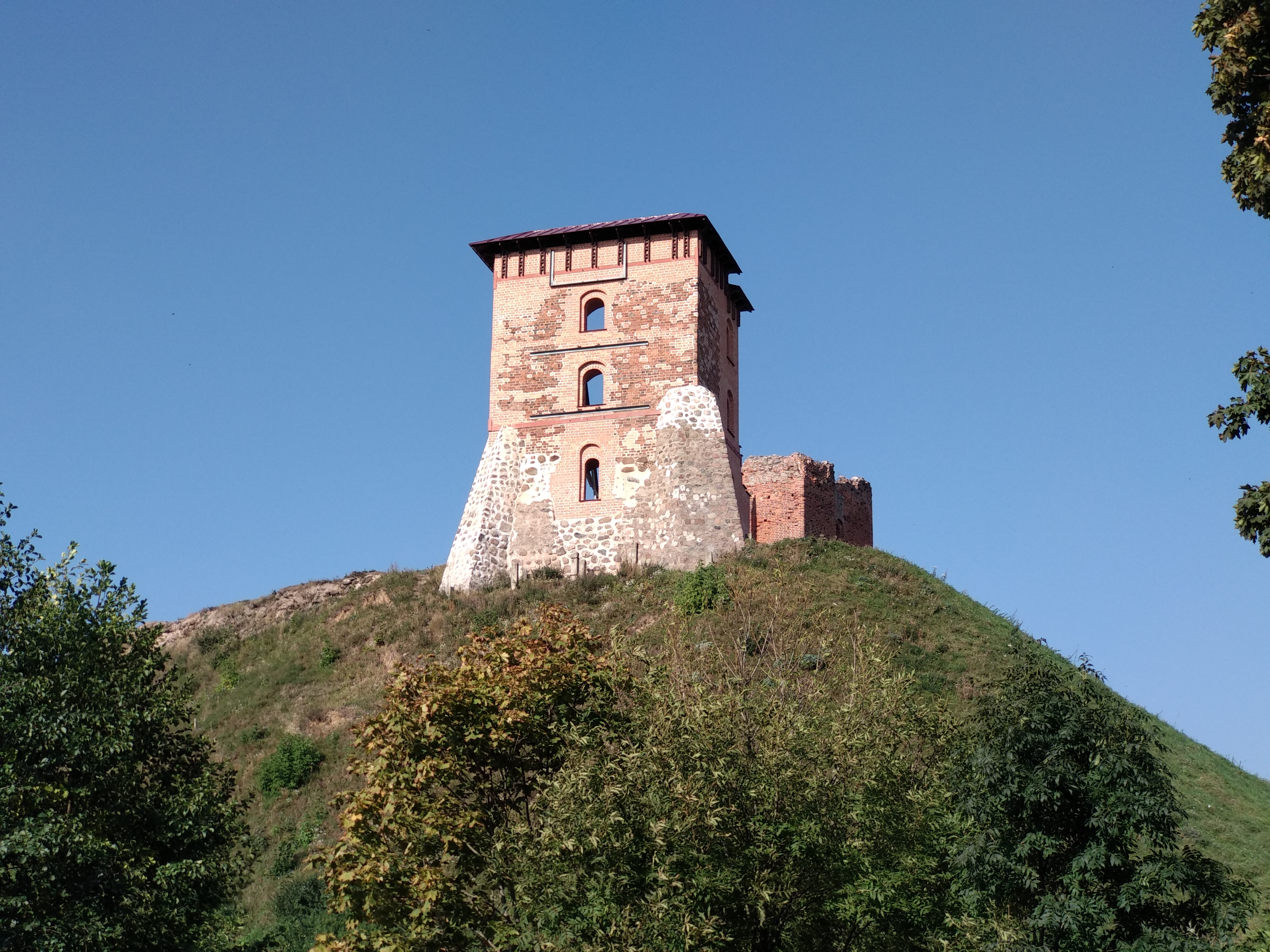
Navahrudak Castle in September 2018

The former castle in Navahrudak, Belarus (Belarusian: Навагрудскі замак, Lithuanian: Naugarduko pilis, Polish: Zamek w Nowogródku) was one of the strongholds of the Grand Duchy of Lithuania, cited by Maciej Stryjkowski as the location of Mindaugas's coronation as King of Lithuania as well as his likely burial place. On the opinion of Lithuanian historians (T.Baranauskas etc.), there is no information that King Mindaugas lived or visited Navahrudak at all - it is Maciej Stryjkowski's 16th century written conjecture in the interpretation of legends.

As early as the 14th century, the Principality of Navahrudak is known to have possessed a stone tower along the lines of Tower of Kamyanyets. Other fortifications were made of timber. The castle was stormed by the Teutonic Knights under Heinrich von Plötzke in 1314. Although the attack was not successful, the tower sustained substantial damage.

During the reign of Vytautas the Great four new stone towers were added to the system of Navahrudak fortifications. In the 17th century, the main castle boasted 7 towers, apart from those of the Lesser Castle. Navahrudak was one of the northernmost forts besieged by the Crimean Tatars in the 16th century.

Navahrudak was twice occupied by Russian forces during the Russo-Polish War (1654–67). Further destruction was inflicted by the Swedes who sacked Navahrudak as part of the Great Northern War in 1706. Attempts to preserve the ruins from further decay were undertaken in the 1920s. The castle grounds at present provide the setting for medieval reenactment and theatrical jousting.

== Gallery ==
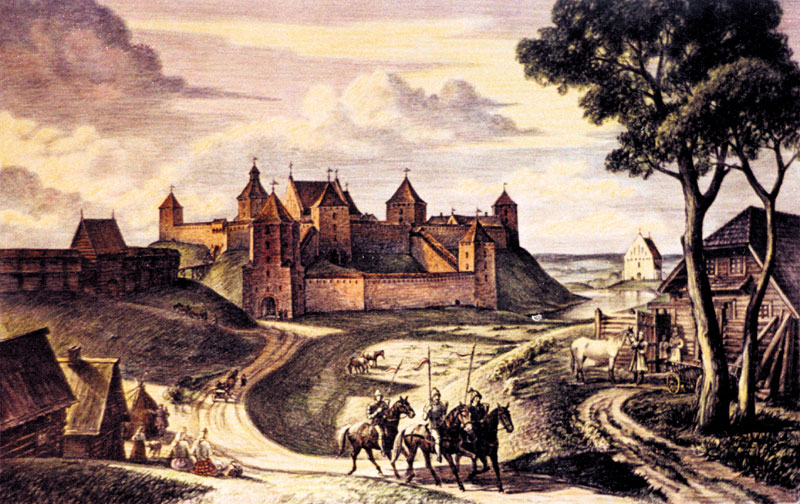
Modern reconstruction

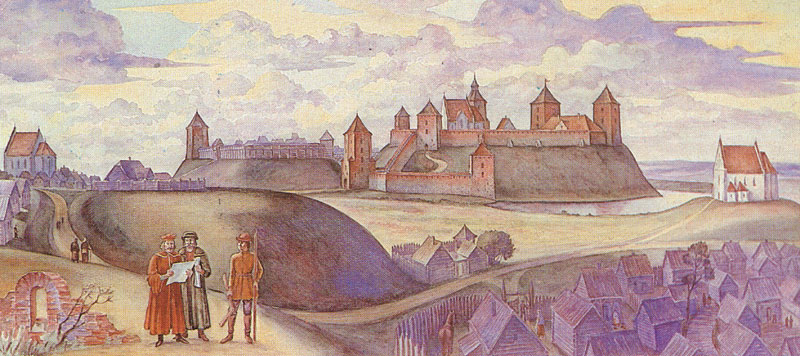
Modern reconstruction

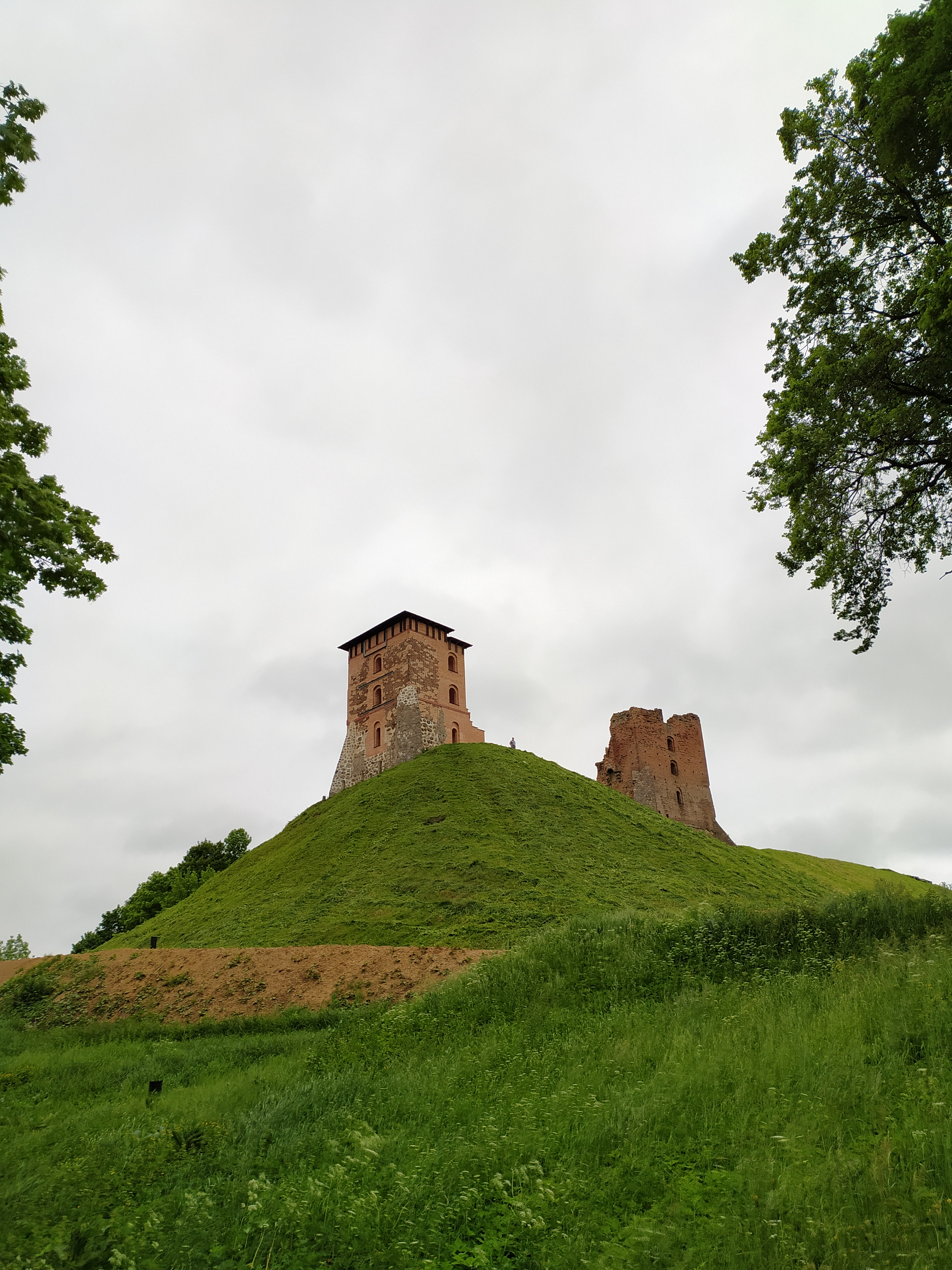
The ruins

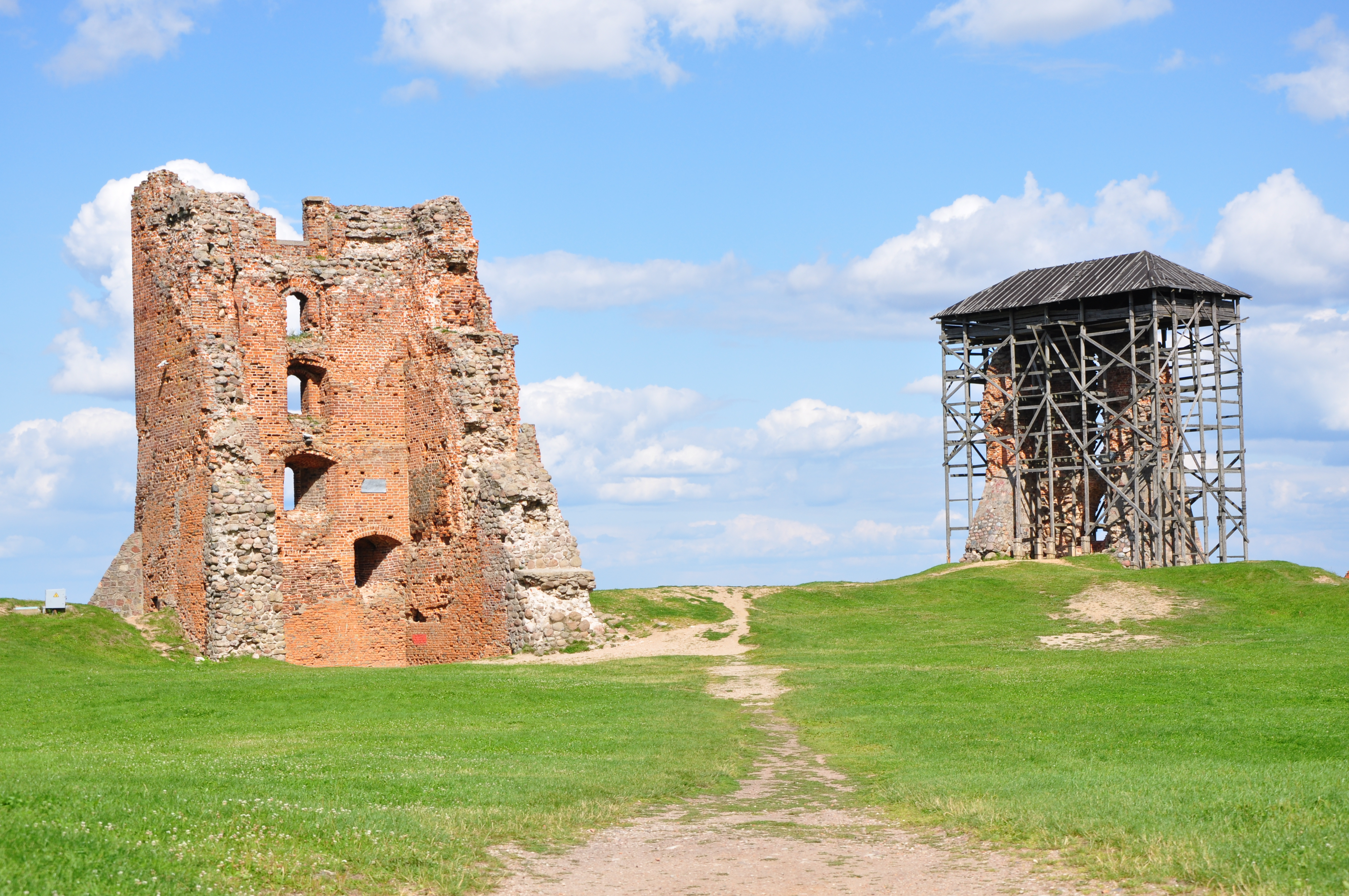
The ruins during the partial reconstruction, 2018

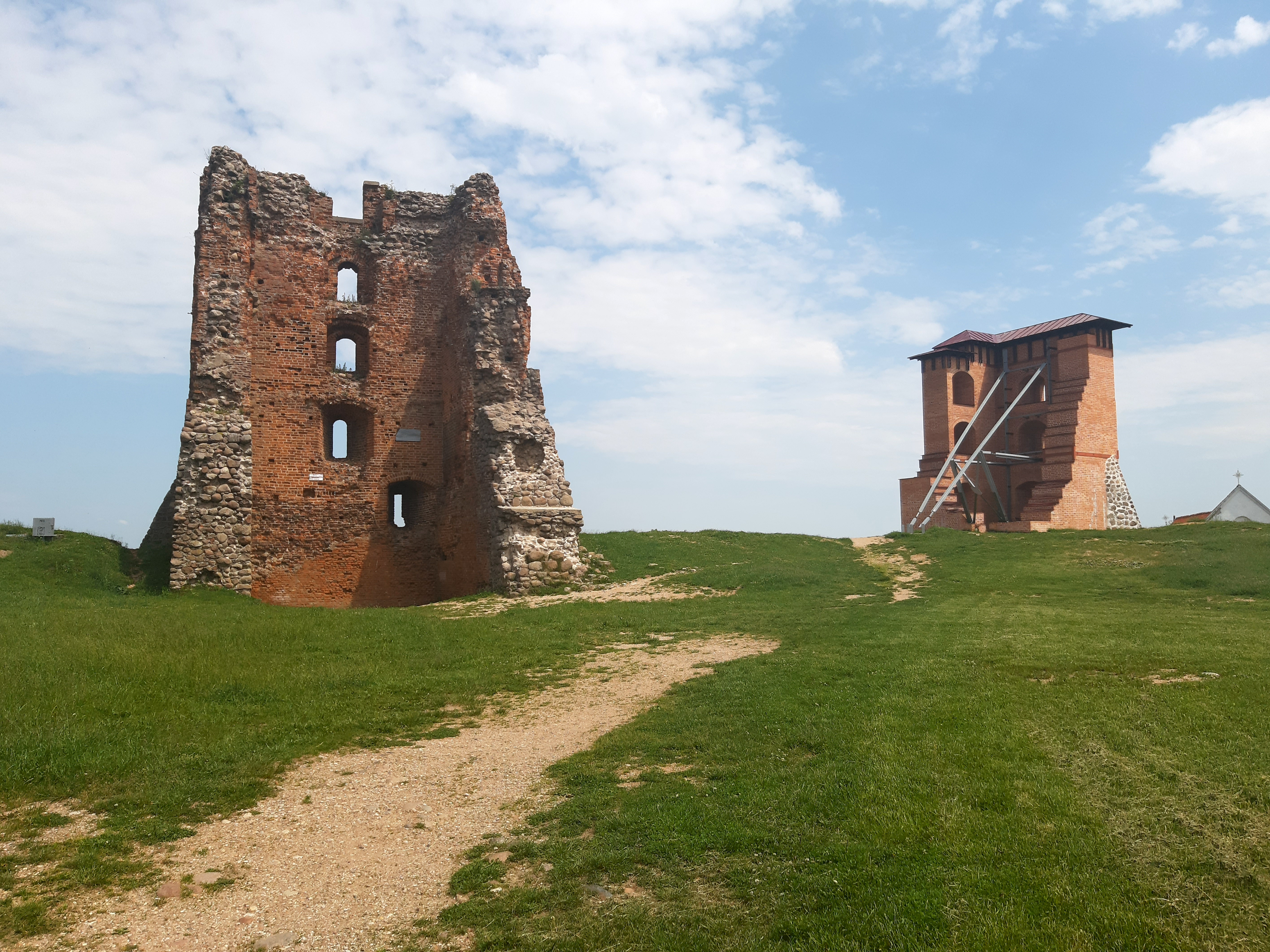
The ruins after the partial reconstruction, 2020
