= Treaty of Soldin (1309) =

1309 treaty between Brandenburg-Stendal and the Teutonic Order

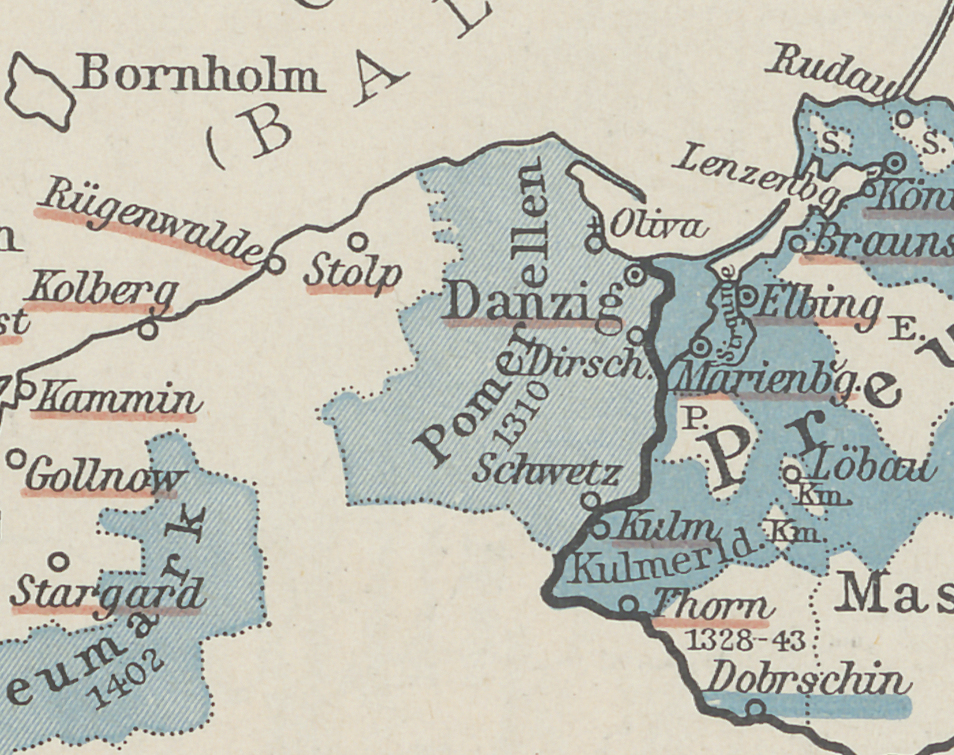
Pomerelia as part of the monastic state of the Teutonic Knights shortly after 1308

The Treaty of Soldin (German: Vertrag von Soldin) was signed on 13 September 1309 at Soldin (Myślibórz) by Waldemar, Margrave of Brandenburg-Stendal, and the Teutonic Order.

In 1308, the Order had agreed to help Polish forces retake the city of Danzig (Gdańsk) from the Brandenburgians, in exchange for being allowed to garrison a nearby fort for a year. However, during the siege, disputes arose as to the extent of the fort that was to be loaned to the Teutonic Knights, and after being seized and briefly imprisoned, the Polish troops departed the siege. After they captured the city, the Teutonic Knights massacred its inhabitants and took the town for their own.

However, the Order still lacked any legal basis for their possession of Danzig. As a result, they purchased these from Brandenburg, as well as the rights to most of Pomerelia (Dirschau (Tczew), Schwetz (Świecie) and their hinterlands) for 10,000 silver Mark, despite the fact that the initial claims to Danzig and surrounding areas by Brandenburg were themselves of dubious legality.

The treaty was subsequently confirmed in 1311 by Emperor-elect Henry VII, but repeatedly questioned by Poles, resulting in the Polish-Teutonic Wars.

In the Treaty of Kalisz (1343), the Polish king finally recognized the territorial changes.

The treaty gave the Teutonic Order control of the lower Vistula, a direct access to the Baltic Sea through Danzig, and a continuous route into the Holy Roman Empire. The same year the treaty was signed, the order's headquarters were moved from Venice to Marienburg (Malbork).
