= State of the Teutonic Order =

Baltic state, 1226–1561

Coordinates: 54°43′N 20°31′E

State of the Teutonic Order Staat des Deutschen Ordens (German) Stat des Diutschen Ordens (Middle Low German) Civitas Ordinis Theutonici (Latin)
- 1226–1561
- Coat of arms

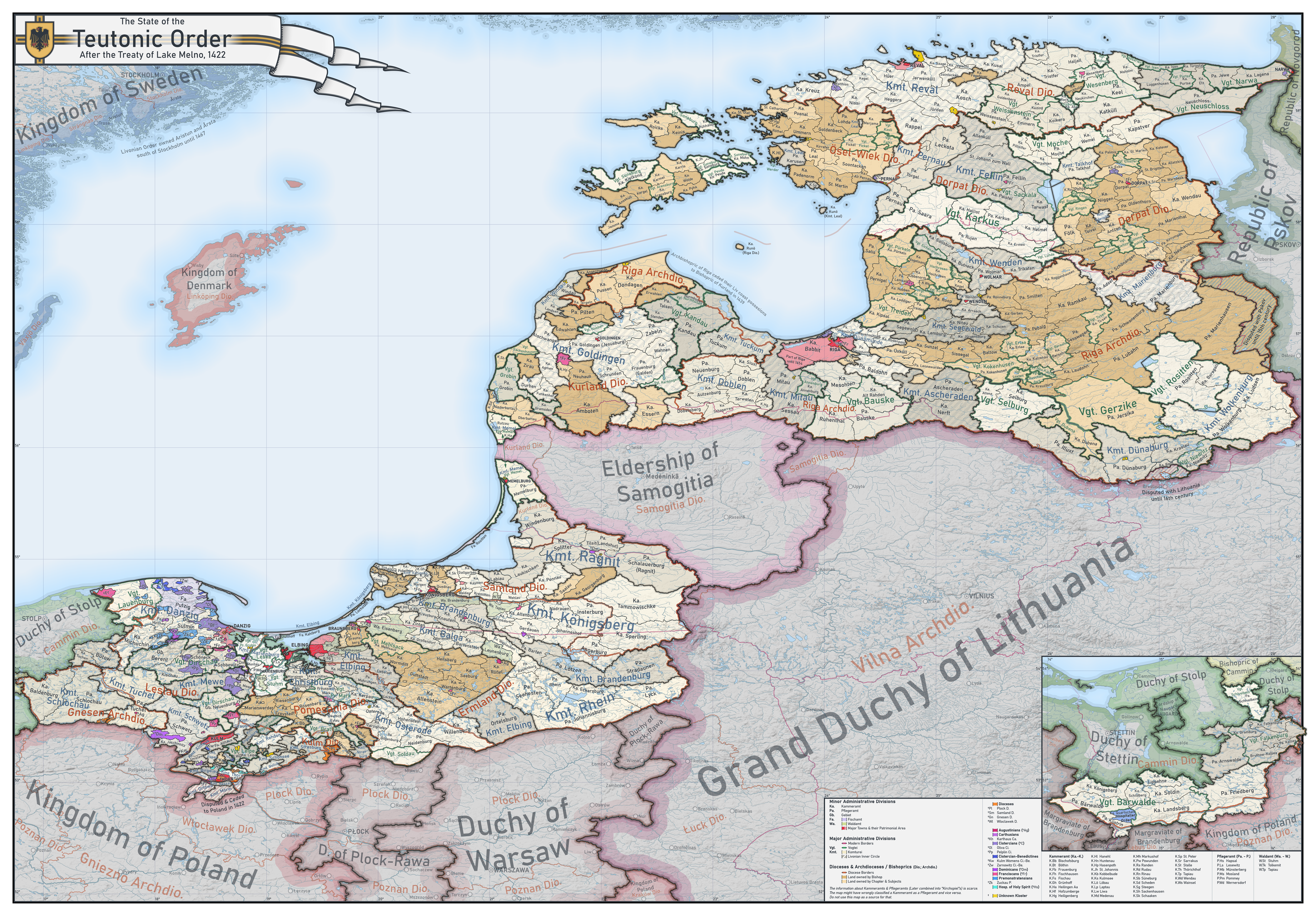
- The State of the Teutonic Order in 1422
- Status: Sovereign state (1230–1466); Fief (Prussia only) of the Polish Crown (1466–1525)
- Capital: Marienburg (1309–1457); Königsberg (1457–1525)
- Common languages: Middle Low German; Middle High German, later Early New High German; Old Prussian; Medieval Latin; Baltic languages; Estonian; Livonian; Old Polish
- Religion: Roman Catholicism
- Demonym: Teuton
- Government: Theocratic elective monarchy
- Grand Master (until 1308); Grand Master and Land Master of Prussia (until 1525); Land Master of Livonia (until 1561)
  - 1226–1239: Hermann von Salza (first reigning Grand Master)
  - 1510–1525: Albert, Duke of Prussia (last reigning Grand Master and Land Master of Prussia)
  - 1559–1561: Gotthard Kettler, Duke of Courland (last reigning Land Master of Livonia (Terra Mariana)
- Legislature: Estates
- Historical era: High Middle Ages Late Middle Ages Early Modern period
  - Golden Bull of Rimini: March 1226
  - Teutonic takeover of Danzig (Gdańsk): 08 November 1308
  - Battle of Grunwald: 15 July 1410
  - Thirteen Years' War: 1454–1466
  - Second Peace of Thorn: 19 October 1466
  - Polish–Teutonic War: 1519–1521
  - Prussian Homage (end of the Prussian branch): 10 April 1525
  - Treaty of Vilnius (1561) (end of the Livonian branch): 28 November 1561
- Currency: Mark
Preceded by
Old Prussians
Duchy of Estonia
Yotvingians
Succeeded by
Duchy of Prussia
Duchy of Courland and Semigallia
Duchy of Livonia
Swedish Estonia
Royal Prussia

The State of the Teutonic Order (German: Staat des Deutschen Ordens) was a medieval territorial polity established and ruled by the Teutonic Order, a Catholic military order, in Prussia along the southeastern coast of the Baltic Sea. The Order established its rule during the Prussian Crusade from the 1230s, conquering territories inhabited by the Old Prussians and developing a network of castles and settlements. In 1237, the Livonian Brothers of the Sword were incorporated into the Teutonic Order, forming its Livonian branch. The branch developed considerable political autonomy and governed its own territories in Livonia, alongside territories ruled by bishops and other authorities.

The Order expanded its Prussian territories through conquest and settlement, including the acquisition of Pomerelia in 1308–1309. Following its defeat by Poland and Lithuania at the Battle of Grunwald in 1410, the Order faced continuing political and military challenges, culminating in the Thirteen Years' War (1454–1466). Under the Second Peace of Thorn in 1466, the Order ceded Pomerelia and western Prussia to the Polish Crown, where they formed part of Royal Prussia. The remaining Prussian territories continued under the Order's rule as a fief of the Polish Crown.

In 1525, during the Protestant Reformation, Grand Master Albert of Brandenburg-Ansbach secularised the Order's remaining Prussian territories, establishing the Lutheran Duchy of Prussia as a fief of the Polish Crown. The Livonian branch continued until the Livonian War, when agreements concluded in 1561 led to its dissolution and secularisation in 1562. Its former territories were divided among neighbouring rulers, with Gotthard Kettler becoming the first duke of Courland and Semigallia.

== Names ==
The state is known in German as Staat des Deutschen Ordens (pronounced [ˈʃtaːt dɛs ˌdɔʏtʃn̩ ˈʔɔʁdn̩s]), Deutschordensstaat (pronounced [ˈdɔʏtʃʔɔʁdn̩sˌʃtaːt]), or simply Ordensstaat (pronounced [ˈɔʁdn̩sˌʃtaːt]). The Latin name is Civitas Ordinis Theutonici.

Other language forms include Stat des Diutschen Ordens in Middle Low German, Vokiečių ordino valstybė in Lithuanian, and Państwo zakonu krzyżackiego in Polish.

== Background ==
=== Polish campaigns against the Old Prussians ===
Prussian clans, 13th century

The Old Prussians had withstood many attempts at conquest preceding that of the Teutonic Knights. Bolesław I of Poland began the series of unsuccessful conquests when he sent Adalbert of Prague in 997. In 1147, Bolesław IV of Poland attacked Prussia with the aid of Kievan Rus' but was unable to conquer it. Numerous other attempts followed, and, under Duke Konrad I of Masovia, were intensified, with large battles and crusades in 1209, 1219, 1220 and 1222.

The West Baltic Prussians successfully repelled most of the campaigns and managed to strike Konrad in retaliation. However, the Prussians and the Yotvingians in the south had their territory conquered. The land of the Yotvingians was situated in the area of what is today the Podlaskie Voivodeship of Poland. The Prussians attempted to oust Polish or Masovian forces from Yotvingia, which by now was partially conquered, devastated and almost totally depopulated.

=== Papal edicts ===
Konrad of Masovia had already called a crusade against the Old Prussians in 1208, but it was not successful. Konrad, acting on the advice of Christian, first bishop of Prussia, established the Order of Dobrzyń, a small group of 15 knights. The Order, however, was soon defeated and, in reaction, Konrad called on the Pope for yet another crusade and for help from the Teutonic Knights. As a result, several edicts called for crusades against the Old Prussians. The crusades, involving many of Europe's knights, lasted for sixty years.

In 1211, Andrew II of Hungary enfeoffed the Teutonic Knights with the Burzenland. In 1225, Andrew II expelled the Teutonic Knights from Transylvania, and they had to transfer to the Baltic Sea.

Early in 1224, Emperor Frederick II announced at Catania that Livonia, Prussia with Sambia, and a number of neighboring provinces were under imperial immediacy. This decree subordinated the provinces directly to the Roman Catholic Church and the Holy Roman Emperor as opposed to being under the jurisdiction of local rulers. At the end of 1224, Pope Honorius III announced to all Christendom his appointment of Bishop William of Modena as the Papal Legate for Livonia, Prussia, and other countries.

As a result of the Golden Bull of Rimini in 1226 and the Papal Bull of Rieti of 1234, Prussia came into the Teutonic Order's possession. The Knights began the Prussian Crusade in 1230.

Under their governance, large areas of broadleaf forest were cleared for cultivation, swamps were drained to create farmland, and the population of the teutonic state increased after the Crusades, especially with the construction of cities. It is estimated that at the beginning of the 14th century, the population of the Order's state was around 220,000 inhabitants, composed of a mix of Prussian, Slavic, and German ethnicities. Brickyards were built and their production (bricks, tiles) was largely used on site, often for Teutonic fortifications.

In addition, mills such as Wielki Młyn (“Great Mill”), built in 1350, were constructed, and in important cities such as Danzig, religious orders built churches and monasteries.

=== Cities founded ===
Unlike the newly-founded cities between the Rivers Elbe and Oder, the cities founded by the Teutonic Order had a much more regular, rectangular sketch of streets, indicating their character as planned foundations. The cities were heavily fortified, accounting for the long lasting conflicts with the resistant native Old Prussians, with armed forces under the command of the knights. Most cities were prevailingly populated by settlers who came mainly from Silesia, Central Germany (where the knights of the Order came from) and, later, from various territories in northern Germany.

The cities were usually given Magdeburg law town privileges, with the one exception of Elbing (Elbląg), which was founded with the support of Lübeckers and thus was awarded Lübeck law. While the Lübeckers provided the Order with important logistic support with their ships, they were otherwise, with the exception of Elbing, rather uninvolved in the establishment of the Monastic State.

The Hanseatic League exerted immense influence on Prussia, the Slavic and Latvian nations, and even Russia. The trade and industry it stimulated gave rise to cities populated by Poles and Russians. In Poland, most cities were founded in the 14th century. At their founding, German artisans and merchants were attracted by significant privileges and formed guilds and trade associations, just as they had in their homeland. Novgorod had a distinctly German urban layout. German guilds already existed in Vilnius in the 15th century. A large number of German artisans, mostly living within regulated guild structures, reside in almost every major city in Russia and Poland.

== History ==
=== 13th century ===
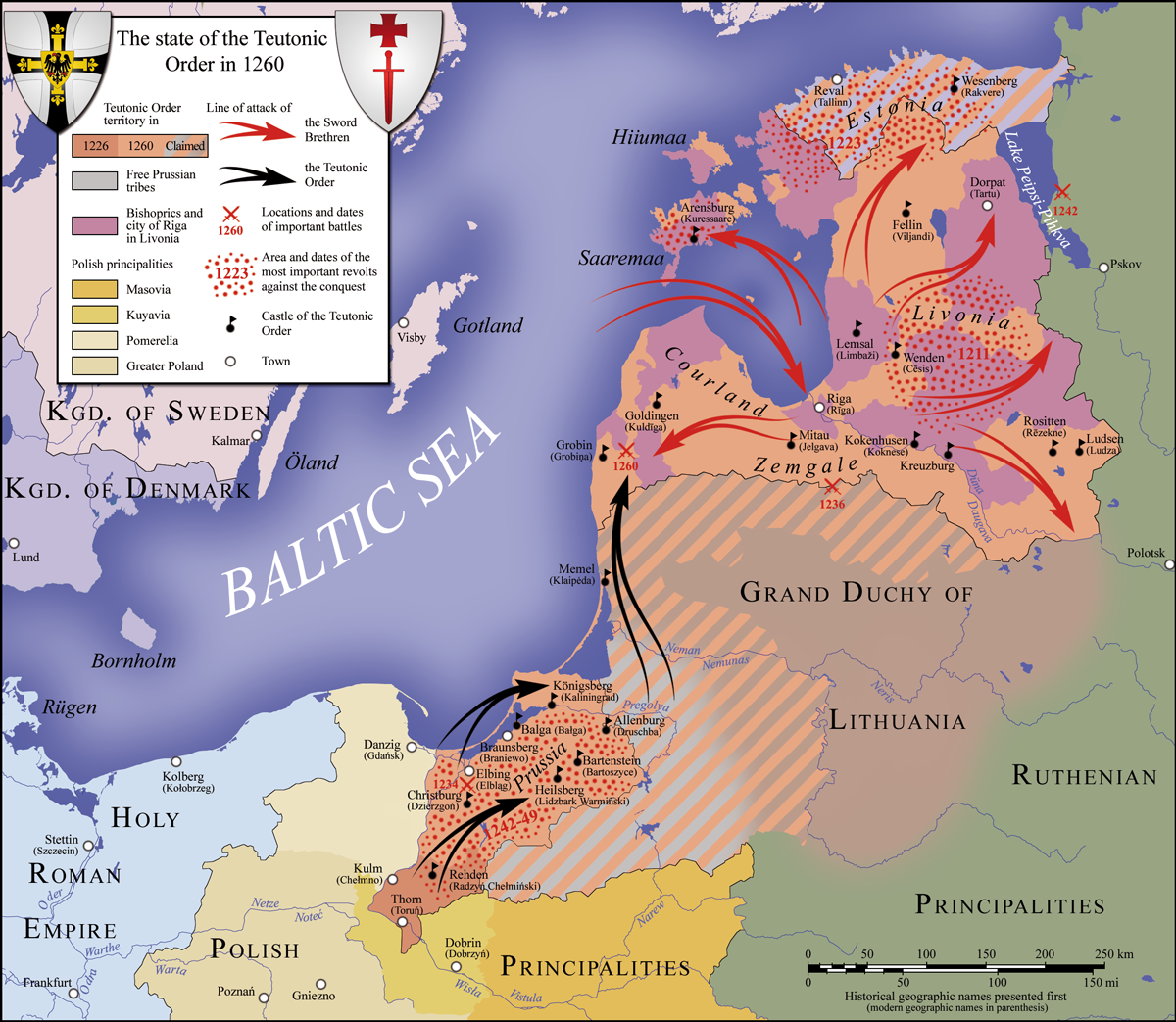
Teutonic state in 1260

In 1234, the Teutonic Order assimilated the remaining members of the Order of Dobrzyń and, in 1237, the Order of the Livonian Brothers of the Sword. The assimilation of the Livonian Brothers of the Sword (established in Livonia in 1202) increased the Teutonic Order's lands with the addition of the territories known today as Latvia and Estonia.

In 1243, the Papal legate William of Modena divided Prussia into four bishoprics: Culm (Chełmno), Pomesania, Ermland (Warmia) and Samland (Sambia). The bishoprics became suffragans to the Archbishopric of Riga under the mother city of Visby on Gotland. Each diocese was fiscally and administratively divided into one-third reserved for the maintenance of the capitular canons, and two-thirds were where the Order collected the dues. The cathedral capitular canons of Culm, Pomesania and Samland were simultaneously members of the Teutonic Order since the 1280s, ensuring a strong influence by the Order. Only Warmia's diocesan chapter maintained independence, enabling it to establish its autonomous rule in the capitular third of Warmia's diocesan territory (Prince-Bishopric of Warmia).

=== 14th century ===
==== Danzig and the Hansa ====
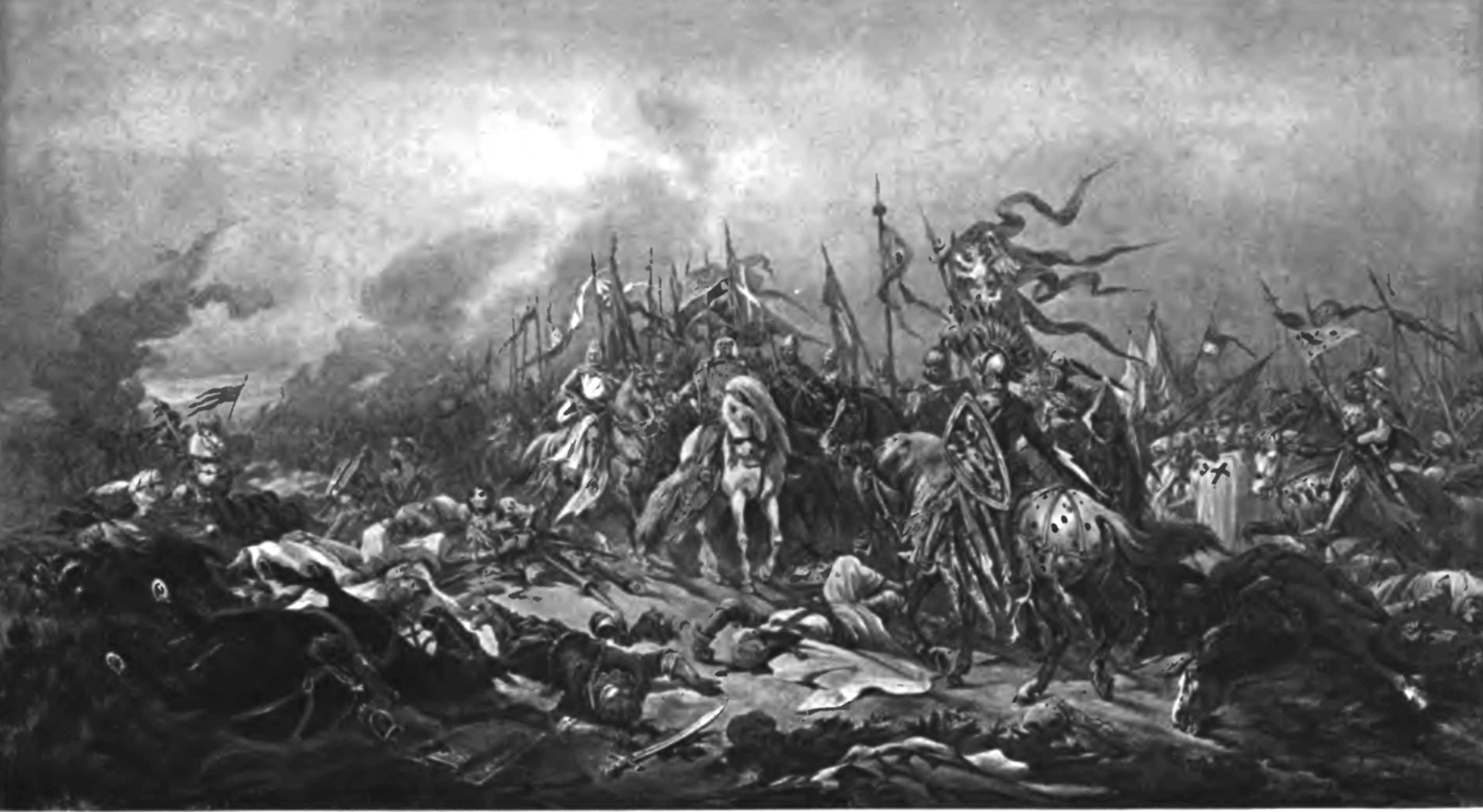
The Battle of Płowce (1331) was a major battle of the Second Polish–Teutonic War, 19th century painting by Juliusz Kossak

At the beginning of the 14th century, the Duchy of Pomerania, a neighboring region, plunged into war with Poland and the Margraviate of Brandenburg to the west. The Teutonic Knights seized the Polish port city of Gdańsk in November 1308. The Order had been called by King Władysław I of Poland to help repel a Brandenburgian invasion; however, the Teutonic Knights themselves began to occupy the city and the region. The Teutonic Knights then carried out a massacre of the inhabitants of the city. Contemporary scholarship places the estimated number of victims of the massacre at approximately 1,000. In September 1309, Margrave Waldemar of Brandenburg-Stendal sold his claim to the territory to the Teutonic Order for the sum of 10,000 Marks in the Treaty of Soldin. This marked the beginning of a series of conflicts between Poland and the Teutonic Knights as the Order continued incorporating territories into its domains.

While the Order promoted the Prussian cities by granting them extended surrounding territory and privileges, establishing courts, civil and commercial law, it allowed the cities less outward independence than free imperial cities enjoyed within the Holy Roman Empire.

The members of the Hanseatic League did consider merchants from Prussian cities as their like, but also accepted the Grand Master of the Order as the sole territorial ruler representing Prussia at their Hanseatic Diets. Thus Prussian merchants, along with those from Ditmarsh, were the only beneficiaries of a quasi membership within the Hansa, although lacking the background of citizenship in a fully autonomous or free city. Only merchants from the six Prussian Hanseatic cities of Braunsberg (Braniewo), Culm (Chełmno), Danzig (Gdańsk), Elbing (Elbląg), Königsberg and Thorn (Toruń) were considered fully fledged members of the league, while merchants from other Prussian cities had a lesser status.

The Teutonic Order's annexation and possession of Gdańsk (Danzig) and the surrounding region was consistently disputed by the Polish kings Władysław I and Casimir III the Great – claims that led to the Polish–Teutonic War (1326–1332) and, eventually, lawsuits in the papal court in 1320 and 1333, which ruled in favor of Poland, however, the Teutonic Knights did not comply and continued to occupy the annexed Polish territories. The Teutonic Knights even invaded Poland further and briefly occupied the regions of Kuyavia and Dobrzyń Land. A peace was concluded at Kalisz in 1343, Kuyavia and Dobrzyń Land were restored to Poland, and the Teutonic Order agreed that Poland should rule Pomerelia as a fief and Polish kings, therefore, retained the right to the title Duke of Pomerania. The title referred to the Duchy of Pomerelia. Unlike in English, German, Latin or Lithuanian, the Polish language uses the term Pomorze for Pomerania (a fief of Poland, Saxony and Denmark in the High Middle Ages, and first briefly in 1181, but since 1227 a permanent fief within the Holy Roman Empire) and Pomerelia alike. Both duchies were earlier ruled by related dynasties; thus, the semantic title was Duke of Pomerania rather than Duke of Pomerelia, as it was referred to in other languages.

==== Second Danish-Hanseatic War ====
In the conflict between the Hanse and Denmark on the trade in the Baltic, King Valdemar IV of Denmark had held the Hanseatic city of Visby to ransom in 1361. However, the members of the Hanseatic league were undecided whether to unite against him. But when Valdemar IV then captured Prussian merchant ships in the Øresund on their way to England, Grand Master Winrich of Kniprode travelled to Lübeck to propose a war alliance against Denmark, accepted with some reluctance only by the important cities forming the Wendish-Saxon third of the Hanse.

Since Valdemar IV had also attacked ships of the Dutch city of Kampen and other destinations in the Zuiderzee, Prussia and Dutch cities, such as Kampen, Elburg and Harderwijk, allied themselves against Denmark. This resulted in the Hansa calling up a diet in Cologne in 1367 and convening the afore-mentioned non-member cities including Amsterdam and Brielle. The upshot was the founding of the Cologne Federation as a war alliance to counter the Danish threat. More cities, from the Lower Rhine area in the west to Livonia in the east, joined.

Of the major players, only Bremen and Hamburg refused to send forces, but contributed financially. Besides Prussia, three more territorial partners, Henry II of Schauenburg and Holstein-Rendsburg, Albert II of Mecklenburg, and the latter's son Albert of Sweden, joined the alliance, attacking via land and sea, forcing Denmark to sign the Treaty of Stralsund in 1370. Several Danish castles and fortresses were then taken by Hansa forces for fifteen years in order to secure the implementation of the peace conditions.

==== English Merchant Adventurers ====
The invasions of the Teutonic Order from Livonia to Pskov in 1367 had caused the Russians to recoup themselves on Hansa merchants in Novgorod, which again made the Order block exports of salt and herring into Russia. While the relations had eased by 1371 so that trade resumed, they soured again until 1388. The blockade of English and Flemish imports to Russia interrupted Novgorod's trade and the Hansa negotiated with the Order to prevent any supplies from reaching Russia. Although the blockade was not strictly enforced, it led to the signing of a treaty in 1392, which guaranteed the safety and freedom of Hanseatic merchants.

During the Lithuanian Crusade of 1369–1370, ending with the Teutonic victory in the Battle of Rudau, Prussia enjoyed considerable support from English knights. The Order welcomed English Merchant Adventurers, starting to cruise in the Baltic, competing with Dutch, Saxon and Wendish Hanseatic merchants, and allowed them to open outposts in its cities of Danzig and Elbing. This necessarily brought about a conflict with the rest of the Hansa, which was in a heavy argument with Richard II of England, over levies of higher dues. The Merchants struggled to achieve an unsatisfactory compromise.

Dissatisfied, Richard II's navy suddenly attacked six Prussian ships in May 1385 – and those of more Hanse members – in the Zwin, Grand Master Conrad Zöllner von Rothenstein immediately terminated all trade with England. When in the same year the Hansa evacuated all their Danish castles in fulfillment of the Treaty of Stralsund, Prussia argued in favour of a renewal of the Cologne Federation for those deeply concerned about the ensuing conflict with England, but could not prevail.

The cities preferred to negotiate and take retaliatory actions, such as counter-confiscation of English merchandise. So when in 1388 Richard II finally reconfirmed the Hanseatic trade privileges, Prussia once again permitted merchant adventurers, granting permissions to remain; for this action, they were renounced once again by the Grand Master Conrad of Jungingen in 1398.

In the conflict with the Burgundian Philip the Bold on the Hansa privileges in the Flemish cities, the positions of the Hanseatic cities and Prussia were again reversed. Here, the majority of the Hansa members decided in the Hanseatic Diet on 1 May 1388 for an embargo against the Flemish cities. Meanwhile, Prussia could not prevail with its plea for further negotiations.

==== Trading ====
The Order's Großschäffer was one of the leading functionaries of the order. The word translates roughly as "chief sales and buying officer" with procurement. This officer was in charge of the considerable commerce, import, export, crediting, real estate investment, etc., which the Order carried out, using its network of bailiwicks and agencies which spanned much of Central, Western and Southern Europe as well as the Holy Land. The other Großschäffer in Marienburg had the grain export monopoly. As to imports, neither was bound to any particular merchandise. From Königsberg, holding the monopoly in amber export, achieved the exceptional permission to continue amber exports to Flanders and textile imports in return. On the occasion of the ban on Flemish trade, the Hansa urged Prussia and Livonia again to interrupt the exchange with Novgorod as well, but with both blockades Russian and Flemish commodities could not reach their final destinations. In 1392 it was Grand Master Conrad of Wallenrode who supported the Flemish to achieve an acceptable agreement with the Hansa resuming the bilateral trade; while a Hanseatic delegation under Johann Niebur reopened trade with Novgorod in the same year, after reconfirmation of the previous mutual privileges.

Since the late 1380s grave piracy by privateers, promoted by Albert of Sweden and Mecklenburg, actually directed against Margaret I of Denmark, blocked seafaring to the herring supplies at the Scania Market; thus fish prices tripled in Prussia. The Saxon Hansa cities urged Prussia to intervene, but Conrad of Jungingen was more worried about a Danish victory. So only after the cities, led by Lübeck's burgomaster Hinrich Westhof, had liaised the Treaty of Skanör (1395), Albert's defeat manifested, so that Prussia finally sent out its ships, led by Danzig's city councillor Conrad Letzkau. Until 1400, the united Teutonic-Hanseatic flotilla then thoroughly cleared the Baltic Sea of pirates, the Victual Brothers, and even took the island of Gotland in 1398.

Commodity selling prices of Teutonic Order in Prussian Marks, 1400
Saffron	7040	Hungarian iron	21
Ginger	1040	Travel salt	12.5
Pepper	640	Herring	12
Wax	237.5	Flemish salt	8
French wine	109.5	Wismar beer	7.5
Rice	80	Flour	7.5
Steel	75	Wheat	7
Rhenish wine	66	Rye	5.75
Oil	60	Barley	4.2
Honey	35	Ash woad	4.75
Butter	30		

=== 15th century ===
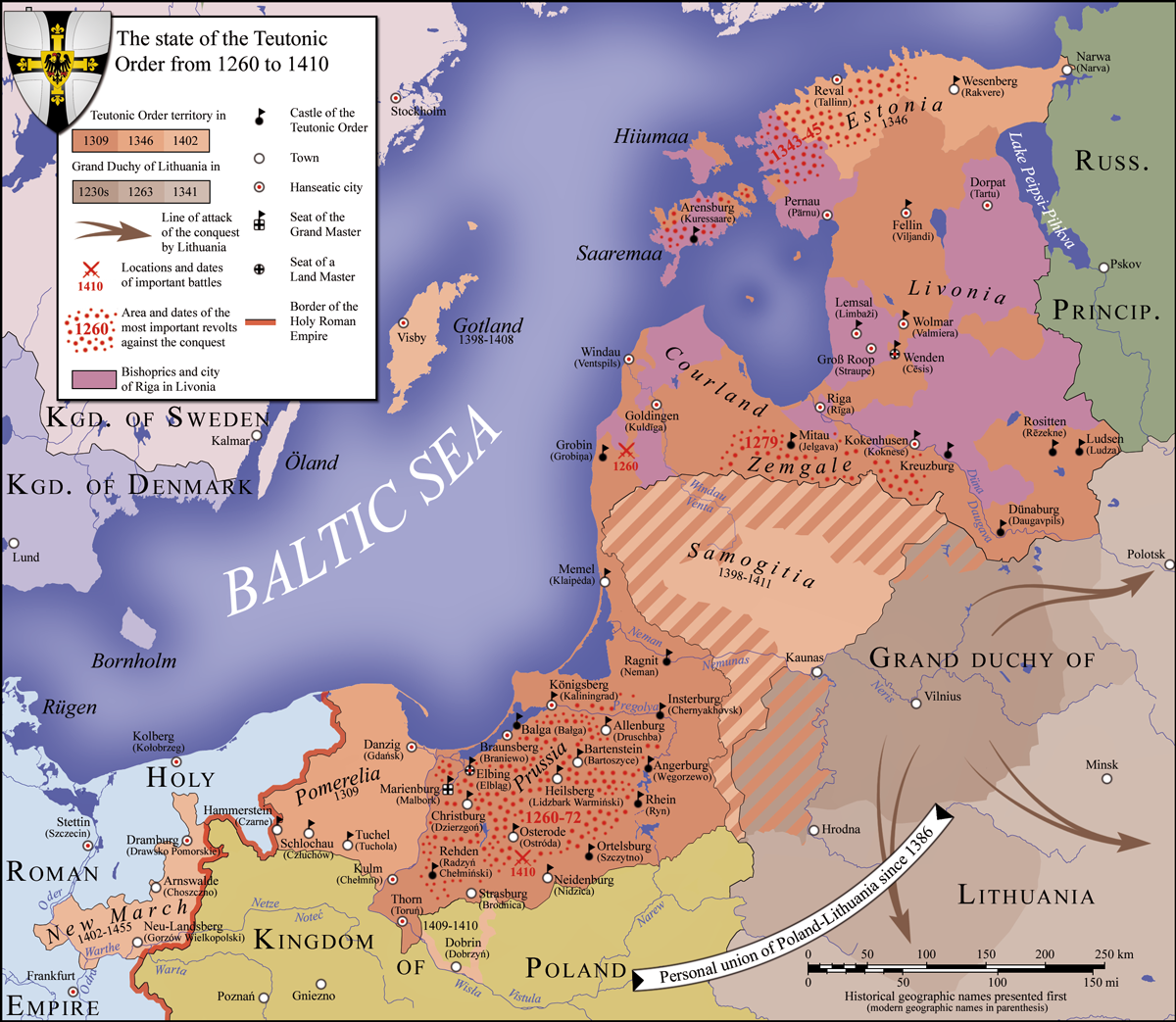
Teutonic state in 1410

==== Konrad von Jungingen ====
At the beginning of the 15th century, the State of the Teutonic Order stood at the height of its power under Konrad (Conrad) von Jungingen. The Teutonic navy ruled the Baltic Sea from bases in Prussia and Gotland, and the Prussian cities provided tax revenues sufficient to maintain a significant standing force composed of Teutonic Knights proper, their retinues, Prussian peasant levies, and German mercenaries.

In 1402, the Luxembourg dynasty, which ruled the Margraviate of Brandenburg, reached an agreement with Poland in Kraków, according to which Poland was to purchase and re-incorporate the region of New March (Neumark). Later that year, however, the Luxembourgs gave the region in pawn to the Teutonic Order despite prior arrangements with Poland, and the Order kept it until Brandenburg redeemed it again in 1454 and 1455, respectively, by the Treaties of Cölln and Mewe. Though the possession of this territory by the Order strengthened ties between the Order and their secular counterparts in northern Germany, it exacerbated the already hostile relationship between the Order and the Polish–Lithuanian union.

The Order fought the War of Gotland in 1403 against the Kalmar Union.

In March 1407, Konrad died from complications caused by gallstones and was succeeded by his younger brother, Ulrich von Jungingen. Under Ulrich, the Teutonic State fell from its precarious height and became mired in internal political strife, near-constant war with the Polish–Lithuanian union, and crippling war debts.

==== Losses to Poland, Polish suzerainty ====
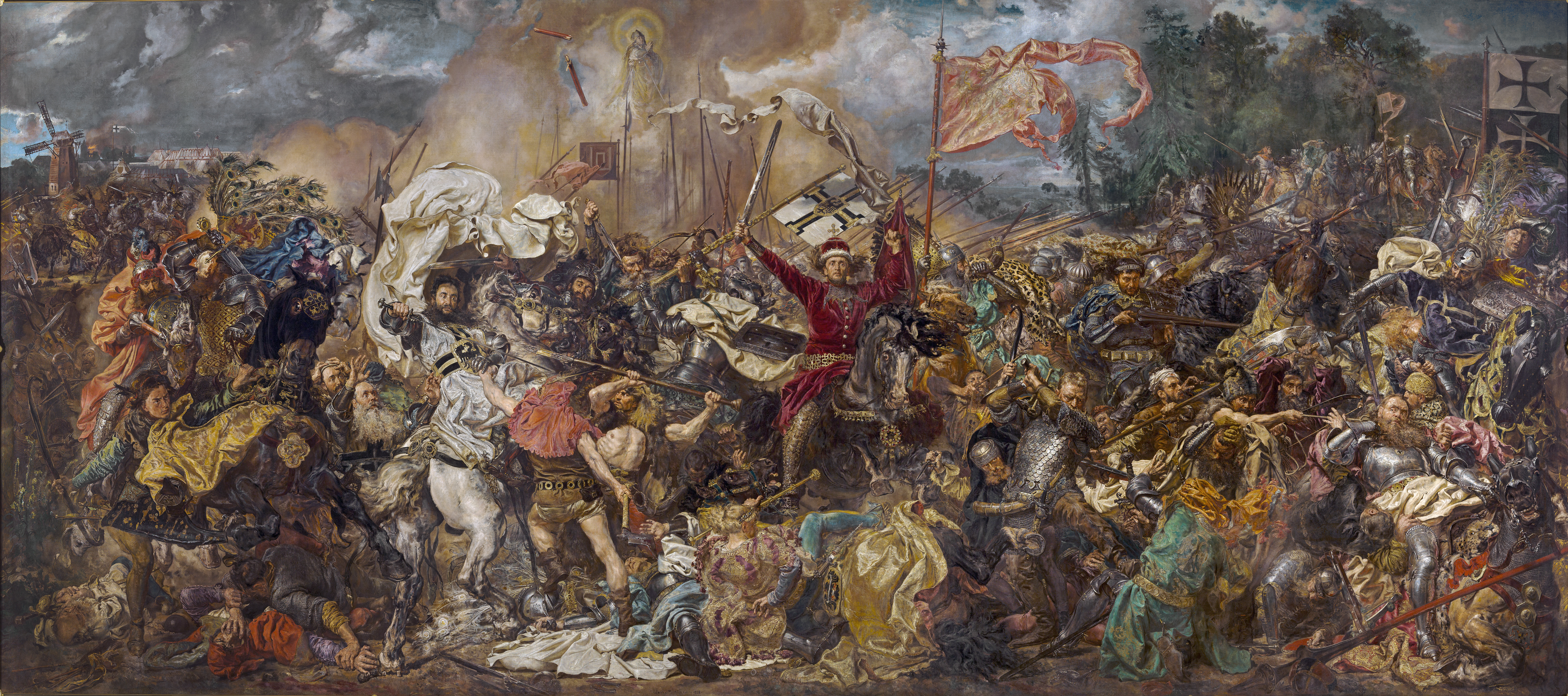
The Battle of Grunwald (1410) marked the start of the decline of the State of the Teutonic Order, 19th century painting by Jan Matejko

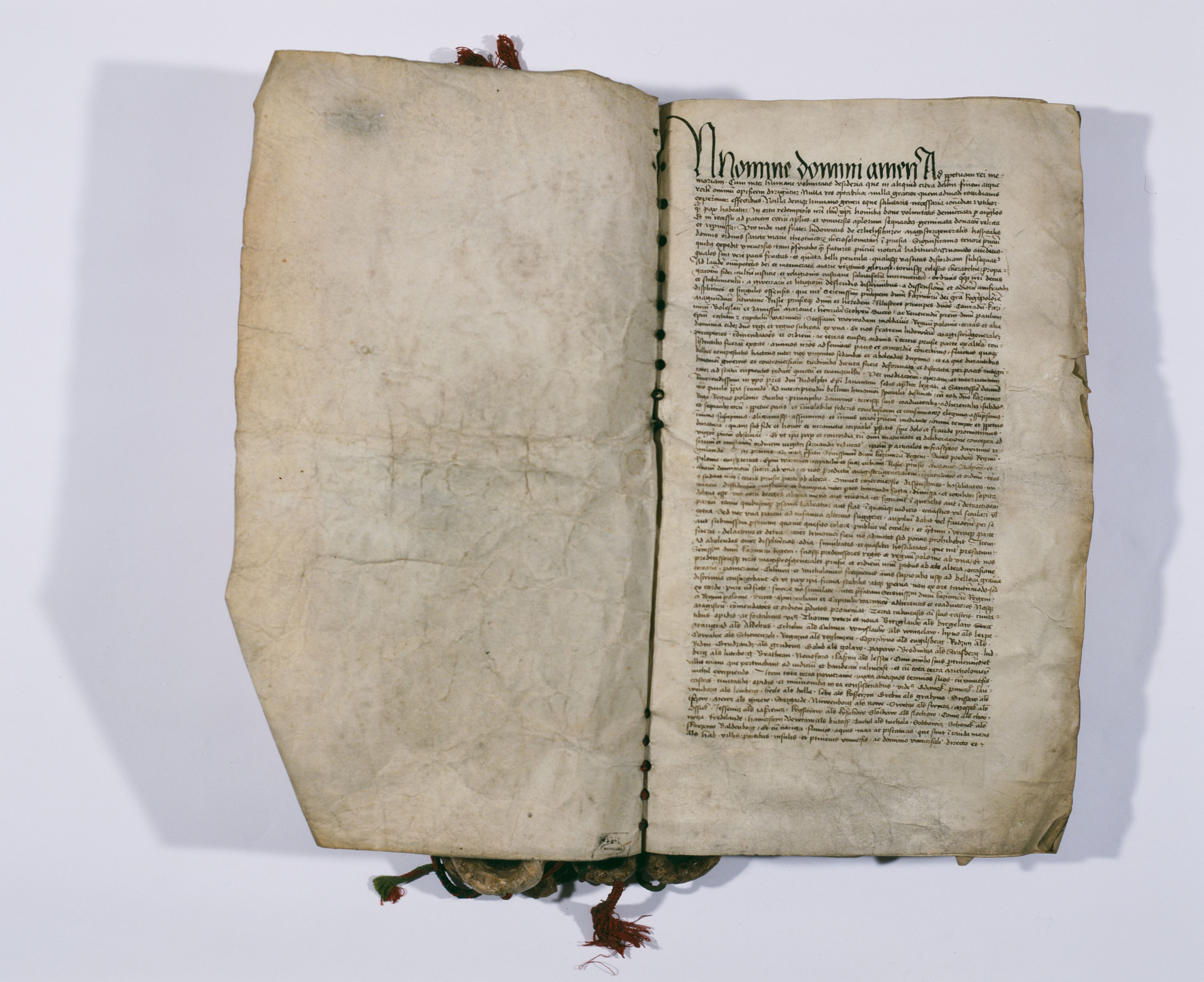
The Polish–Teutonic peace treaty of 1466 made the Teutonic state a fief of the Kingdom of Poland

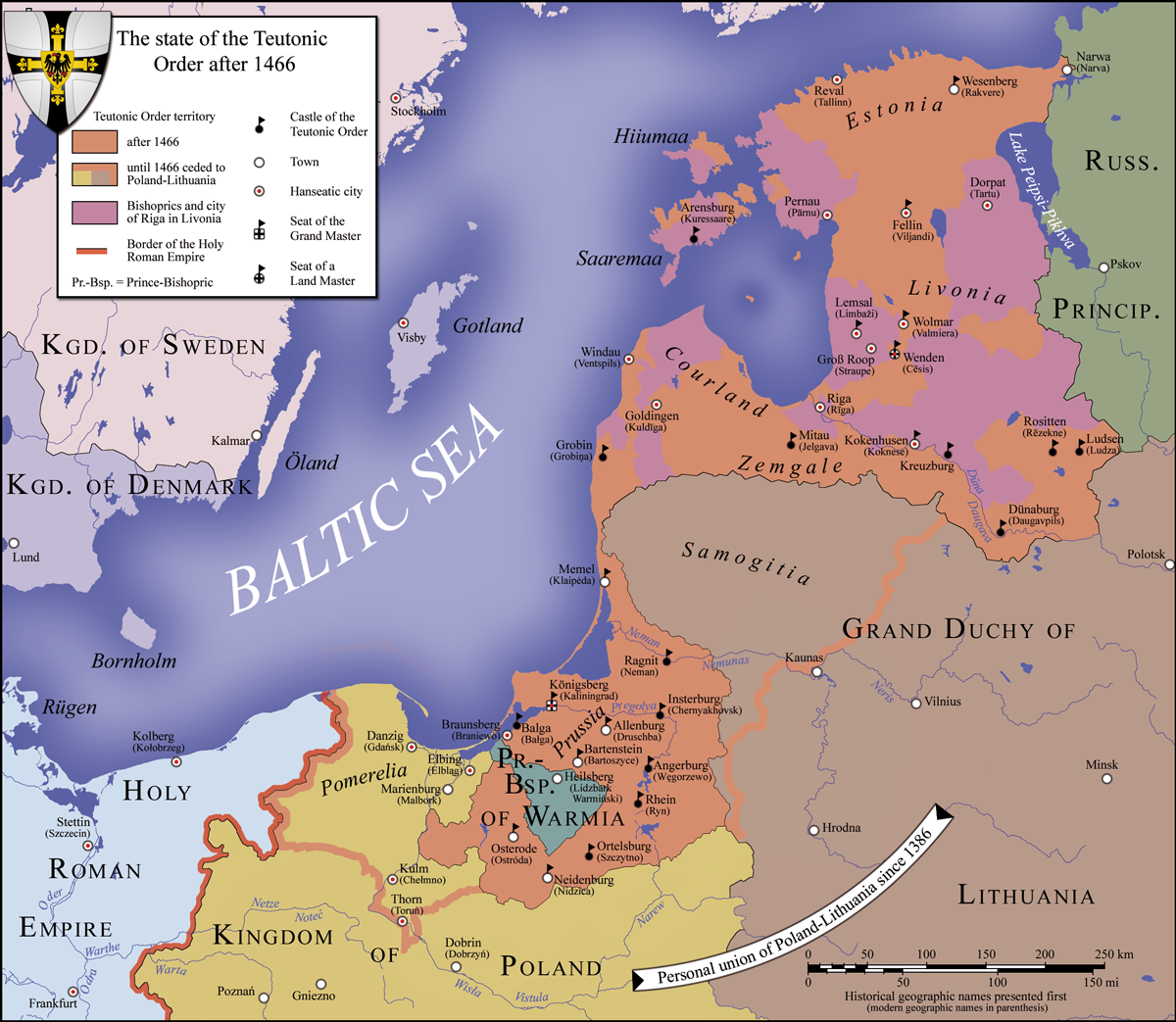
Teutonic state in 1466

In 1408, Conrad Letzkau served as a diplomat to Queen Margaret I and arranged that the Order sell Gotland to Denmark. In 1409, the Teutonic Order invaded Poland's Dobrzyń Land again, and the Polish–Lithuanian–Teutonic War broke out, in which the Teutonic Knights were supported by the Duchy of Pomerania, and the Polish-Lithuanian alliance was supported by Ruthenian, Tatar and Moldavian allies and auxiliary forces. Poland and Lithuania triumphed following a victory at the Battle of Grunwald (Tannenberg), which marked the start of the decline of the State of the Teutonic Order, and the rise of the Polish–Lithuanian union as a major power in Central and Eastern Europe.

The Order assigned Heinrich von Plauen to defend Teutonic-held Eastern Pomerania (Pomerelia), who moved rapidly to bolster the defence of Marienburg Castle in Pomesania. Heinrich von Plauen was elected vice-grand master and led the Teutonic Knights through the Siege of Marienburg in 1410. Eventually, von Plauen was promoted to Grand Master and, in 1411, concluded the First Treaty of Thorn with King Władysław II Jagiełło of Poland.

The next major Polish–Teutonic war was fought in 1431–1435, after the Teutonic Knights invaded Poland again, and was ended in the Peace of Brześć Kujawski, which was favorable for Poland.

In March 1440, gentry (mainly from Culmerland) and the Hanseatic cities of Danzig, Elbing, Kneiphof, Thorn and other Prussian cities founded the Prussian Confederation to free themselves from the overlordship of the Teutonic Knights. Due to the heavy losses and costs after the war against Poland and Lithuania, the Teutonic Order collected taxes at steep rates. Furthermore, the cities were not allowed to be represented by the Teutonic Order.

In February 1454, the Prussian Confederation asked King Casimir IV of Poland to support their revolt and to incorporate the region into the Kingdom of Poland. King Casimir IV agreed and signed the act of incorporation in Kraków on 6 March 1454. The Thirteen Years' War, the longest of the Polish–Teutonic wars (also known as the War of the Cities), broke out. Various cities of the region pledged allegiance to the Polish King in 1454.

The Second Peace of Thorn in October 1466 ended the war and provided for the Teutonic Order's cession of its rights over the western half of its territories to the Polish Kingdom, which became the autonomous province of Royal Prussia. The remaining part of the Order's land became a fief of the Polish Crown. In accordance to the peace treaty, from now on, every Grand Master was obliged to swear an oath of allegiance to the reigning Polish king within six months of taking office, and any new territorial acquisitions by the Teutonic Order, also outside of Prussia, would also be under the suzerainty of Poland. The Grand Master of the Teutonic Order became a prince and counselor of the Polish king and the Kingdom of Poland.

These legal dependencies on the Polish Crown restricted the Order's scope for action. At the end of the 15th century, the political situation appeared hopeless for the Order and the Archbishop of Gniezno even suggested appointing the Polish king as Grand Master in personal union. The Order sought to loosen these shackles by beginning to bestow the title of Grand Master on German princes. This tactical move was intended to secure stronger support from the German Empire and hopefully curb the claims and influence of the Polish king. In 1498, Duke Frederick of Saxony became the first imperial prince to be elected Grand Master. He succeeded in improving relations with German Emperor Maximilian and refused to swear allegiance to the Polish king.

==== Formation of a new nobility ====
While the Knights of the Teutonic Order formed a thin ruling class by themselves, they extensively used mercenaries, mostly German, from the Holy Roman Empire, to whom they granted lands in return. This gradually created a new class of landed nobility. Due to several factors, among which was the high rate of early death in battle, these lands became concentrated over time in the hands of a relatively small number of noblemen, each having a vast estate. This nobility would evolve to what is known as the Prussian Junker nobility.

==== Increasing autonomy in Livonia ====
The Livonian branch remained part of the Teutonic Order but developed increasing political autonomy from the Grand Masters in Prussia after 1410. Although the Grand Masters had previously exercised considerable influence over the appointment of the Landmeister in Livland, disputes over these appointments strengthened the position of the Livonian branch. In 1441, a candidate chosen in Livonia despite opposition from the Grand Master was recognised as Landmeister; from 1470, the Grand Masters were generally presented with the names of candidates already selected in Livonia for confirmation.

By the 15th century, the Livonian leadership pursued a largely independent foreign policy, particularly towards the Russian principalities. Cooperation with the Order's Prussian leadership, including participation in conflicts involving Poland and Lithuania, depended increasingly on the political interests of the Livonian branch rather than solely on the authority of the Grand Master.

=== 16th century and aftermath ===
==== Transformation to Ducal Prussia ====
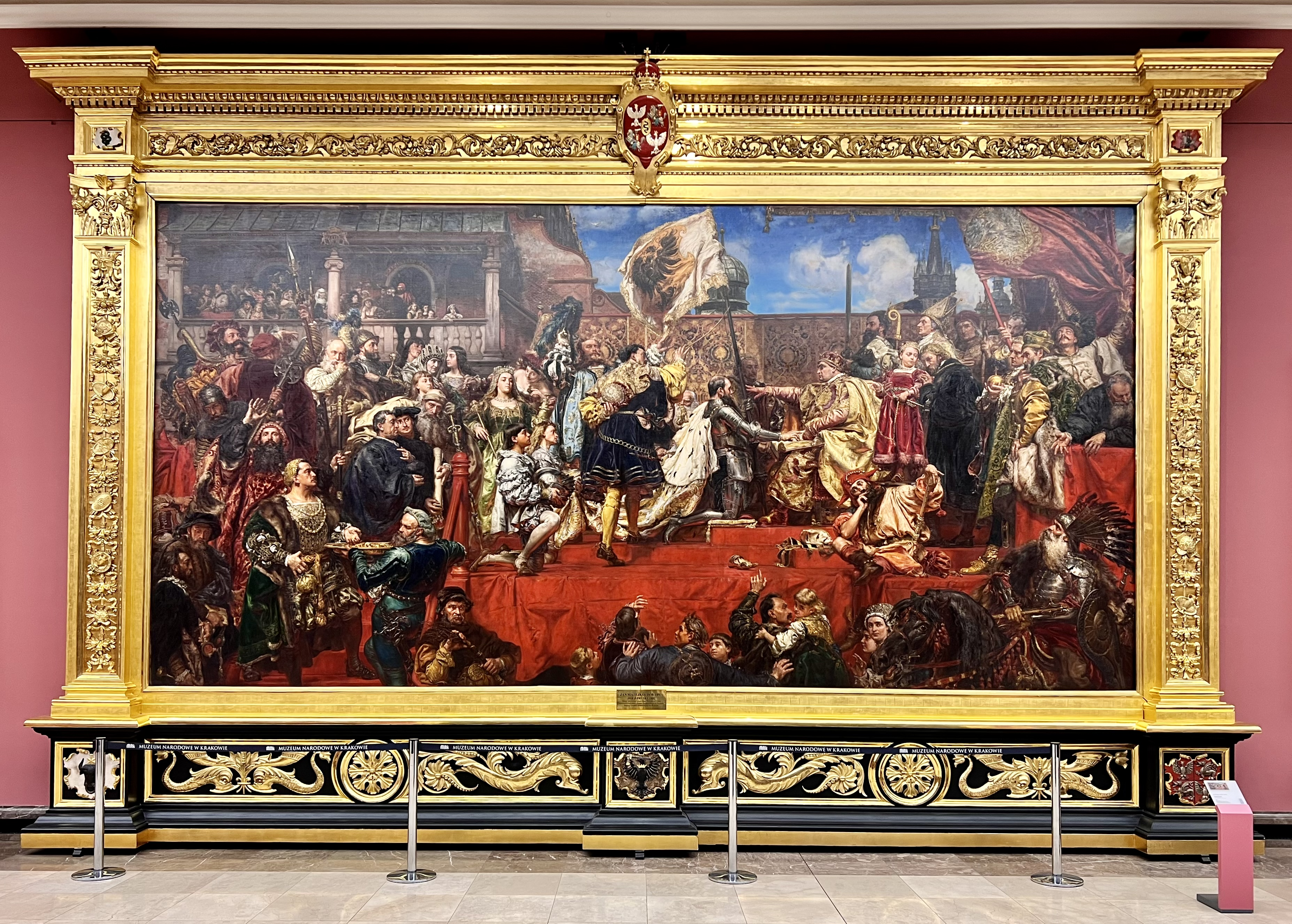
The Prussian Homage of 1525 established Ducal Prussia as a vassal duchy of the Kingdom of Poland, in place of the State of the Teutonic Order

During the Protestant Reformation, endemic religious upheavals and wars occurred across the region. In 1525, during the aftermath of the Polish-Teutonic War (1519–1521), Sigismund I the Old, King of Poland, and his nephew, the last Grand Master of the Teutonic Knights, Albert of Brandenburg-Ansbach, a member of a cadet branch of the House of Hohenzollern, agreed that the latter would resign his position, adopt Lutheran faith and assume the title of Duke of Prussia. Thereafter referred to as Ducal Prussia (German: Herzogliches Preußen, Preußen Herzoglichen Anteils; Polish: Prusy Książęce), remaining a Polish fief.

Thus, in a deal partially brokered by Martin Luther, Roman Catholic Teutonic Prussia was transformed into the Duchy of Prussia, the first Protestant state. Sigismund's consent was bound to Albert's submission to Poland, which became known as the Prussian Homage. On 10 December 1525 at their session in Königsberg the Prussian estates established the Lutheran Church in Ducal Prussia by deciding the Church Order.

The Habsburg-led Holy Roman Empire continued to hold its claim to Prussia and furnished grand masters of the Teutonic Order, who were merely titular administrators of Prussia, but managed to retain many of the Teutonic holdings elsewhere outside of Prussia.

== Administrative divisions ==
=== Prussia ===
==== Commanderies ====
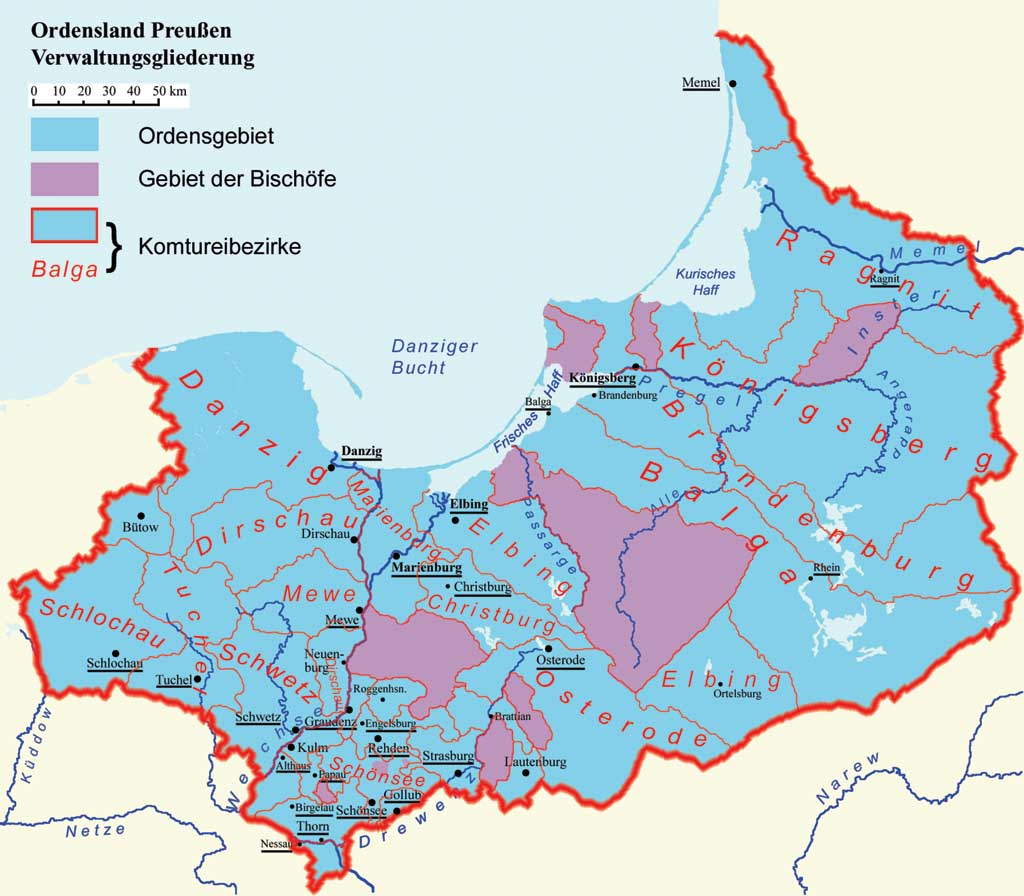
Subdvisions of the Teutonic state in Prussia

The territory of the State of the Teutonic Order in Prussia was divided into Commanderies (Komturei or Kommenden). Large Commanderies were also subdivided into Bailiwicks (Vogteien) and Caretaker Departments (Pflegeämter).

Commanderies of Teutonic Prussia
Althaus	Balga	Birgelau	Brandenburg	Brattian
Christburg	Danzig	Elbing	Engelsburg	Gollub
Graudenz	Königsberg	Kulm	Lippinken	Marienburg
Memel	Mewe	Nessau	Osterode	Papau
Ragnit	Rehden	Rhein	Roggenhausen	Schlochau
Schönsee	Schwetz	Strasburg	Thorn	Tuchel

==== Dioceses ====
The bishoprics of Prussia were established in 1243, under the archbishopric of Riga. In the 1280s, the Order succeeded in imposing the simultaneous membership of all capitular canons in the Order, except for the Warmia; thus influencing the affairs of the dioceses and in the capitular election of the bishops.

Dioceses of Teutonic Prussia
Diocese	Diocese see	Episcopal Residence
Diocese of Samland (Sambia)	Königsberg	Fischhausen
Diocese of Ermland (Warmia)	Frauenburg/Allenstein	Heilsberg
Diocese of Pomesanien (Pomesania)	Marienwerder	Riesenburg
Diocese of Kulm	Kulmsee	Löbau

=== Livonia ===
The structure of the Livonian Confederation was formed with the territories of the Teutonic Knights, four ecclesiastical territories and the Free City of Riga, which had its own government. In 1346, King Valdemar IV of Denmark sold the Duchy of Estonia in northern Estonia to the Teutonic Order for 19,000 silver marks.

The territories of the Teutonic knights in Livonia were divided into Commanderies (Komtureien) and Bailiwicks (Vogteien).

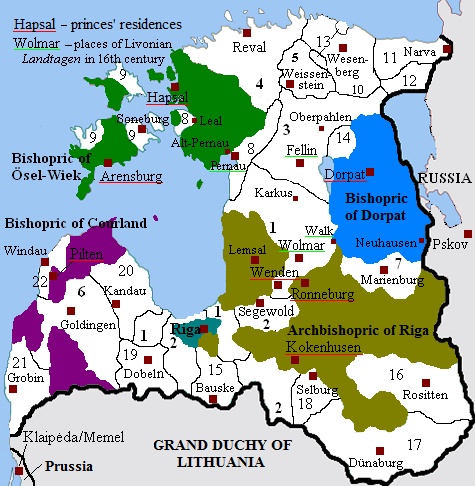
The Livonian Confederation in 1534

Size of the Livonian territories
Teutonic Knights	67.000 km²
Archbishopric of Riga	19.000 km²
Bishopric of Dorpat	9.600 km²
Bishopric of Ösel-Wiek	7.600 km²
Bishopric of Courland	4.600 km²
Free City of Riga	800 km²

Commanderies
Reval	Jerwen	Pernau
Fellin	Talkhof	Marienburg
Segewold	Dünamünde	Ascheraden
Dünaburg	Bauske	Mitau
Doblen	Goldingen	Windau

Bailiwicks
Soneburg	Reval	Narwa
Wesenberg	Neuschloss	Karkhus
Selburg	Rositten	Kandau
Grobin		

=== Temporary acquisitions ===
Duchy of Wizna	1382–1401
Gotland	1398–1408
Duchy of Dobrzyń	1329–1343; 1392–1405; 1409–1411
Samogitia	1398–1411
Neumark	1402–1455

== Archaeology ==
Fortifications of the Teutonic State have been examined through archaeological excavation since the end of World War II, especially those built or expanded during the 14th century. Fortifications are generally the best preserved material legacy of the Order's presence in the Baltic today, and timber and earth, as well as brick examples, are attested in the archaeological record.

The earliest castles in the Teutonic State consisted of simple buildings attached to a fortified enclosure, and the quadrangular red-brick structure would come to typify convent buildings, single-wing castles would continue to be built alongside timber towers. Where they followed the conventional layout, castles included a connected set of communal spaces such as a dormitory, refectory, kitchen, chapter house, a chapel or church, an infirmary, and tower projecting over the moat.

=== Marienburg fort ===
Construction began on Marienburg during the third quarter of the 13th century, and work continued on it until the mid-15th century. A settlement developed alongside the castle, which together enclosed 25 hectares. Granted town rights in 1286, its castle is larger than any other built by the Order. Since 1997, the outer bailey has been thoroughly excavated and dates to the mid-1350s. Preserved at Marienburg was a polychrome statue of Mary about 8 m high, made of artificial stone and originally decorated with mosaic tiles. Since Mary was the most important patron of the knights and central to the liturgy of the Teutonic Order, it is not surprising to find such striking representations of her at its most prominent castle.

=== Coins ===
Coins were minted from the late 1250s. They were often simple in design, stamped with the cross of the Order on one side, but support the notion that crusading, colonisation, and a supporting infrastructure went hand in hand from the earliest years of the Prussian Crusade.

== See also ==
- Ostsiedlung
- Prussia
- War of the Priests (Poland)

== Bibliography ==
- Dollinger, Philippe (1998) [1966]. Hans Krabusch and Marga Krabusch (trls.) (ed.). Die Hanse (La Hanse (XII^{e}–XVII^{e} siècles, Paris, Aubier, 1964) (in German). Vol. 371. Stuttgart: Kröner: Kröners Taschenbuchausgabe. ISBN 3-520-37105-7.
- Dollinger, Philippe (1999). The German Hansa. Psychology Press. p. 77. ISBN 978-0-415-19073-2.
- Pluskowski, Aleksander (2013). The Archaeology of the Prussian Crusade: Holy War and Colonization. London: Routledge. ISBN 978-0415691710.
- Górski, Karol (1949). Związek Pruski i poddanie się Prus Polsce: zbiór tekstów źródłowych (in Polish and Latin). Poznań: Instytut Zachodni.
