= Pilėnai =

Lost hill fort in the Grand Duchy of Lithuania

Siege of Pilėnai
- Part of the Lithuanian Crusade
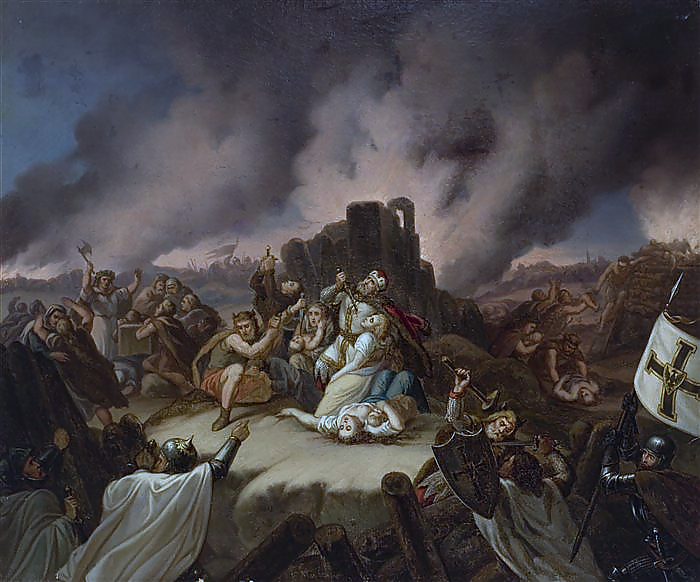
- Duke Margiris defending Pilėnai against the Teutonic Order by Władysław Majeranowski (1817–1874)
Date	February 25, 1336
Location	Pilėnai
Result	Decisive Teutonic victory
Territorial changes	Construction of Bayernburg

Belligerents
Teutonic Order	Grand Duchy of Lithuania

Commanders and leaders
Dietrich von Altenburg	Margiris †

Strength
200 nobles; 6,000 total soldiers	5,000-4,000 people

Casualties and losses
Minimal	Nearly all

Siege of Pilėnai (also Pillenen in German) was a siege of hill fort in the Grand Duchy of Lithuania. Its location is unknown and is subject to academic debates, but it is well known in the history of Lithuania due to its heroic defense against the Teutonic Order in 1336. Attacked by a large Teutonic force, the fortress, commanded by Duke Margiris, tried in vain to organize a defense against the larger and stronger invader. Losing hope, the defenders decided to burn their property and commit mass suicide to deprive the Order of prisoners and loot (cf. scorched earth). This dramatic episode from the Lithuanian Crusade has caught the public imagination, inspired many works of fiction, and became a symbol of Lithuanian struggles and resistance.

== Sources ==
The attack and the defense of Pilėnai were briefly mentioned in several contemporary chronicles, including Epitome gestarum Prussiae by a Sambian canon, Der Chronist von Wolfenbüttel (Chronicler of Wolfenbüttel), Annalista Thorunensis (Annals of Thorn), and Kurze Reimchronik von Preussen (Short Rhymed Chronicle of Prussia). However, these sources recite the basic facts and do not provide enough information to reconstruct the events.

The only contemporary source that describes the events in greater detail is the chronicle of Wigand of Marburg. However, Wigand's original German text has not survived. His work is known from a Latin translation commissioned by Jan Długosz in 1464. Several excerpts of the original German text were published by Caspar Schütz (died 1594) and Stanislaus Bornbach (died 1597). When Theodor Hirsch prepared Wigand's chronicle for publication in Scriptores Rerum Prussicarum, he included these excerpts alongside the Latin translation. In particular, Hirsch believed that Schütz's text on Pilėnai was more complete and accurate copy of Wigand than the Latin translation. This opinion has been widely accepted and historians used Schütz's text, which paints a much more heroic and dramatic picture of Pilėnai, as Wigand's original. This long-standing belief has been challenged by Lithuanian historian Darius Baronas. He has shown that Schütz's text was an unreliable and embellished retelling of Wigand's work. Therefore, the only reliable source is the Latin translation of Wigand's chronicle.

== Attack and defense ==
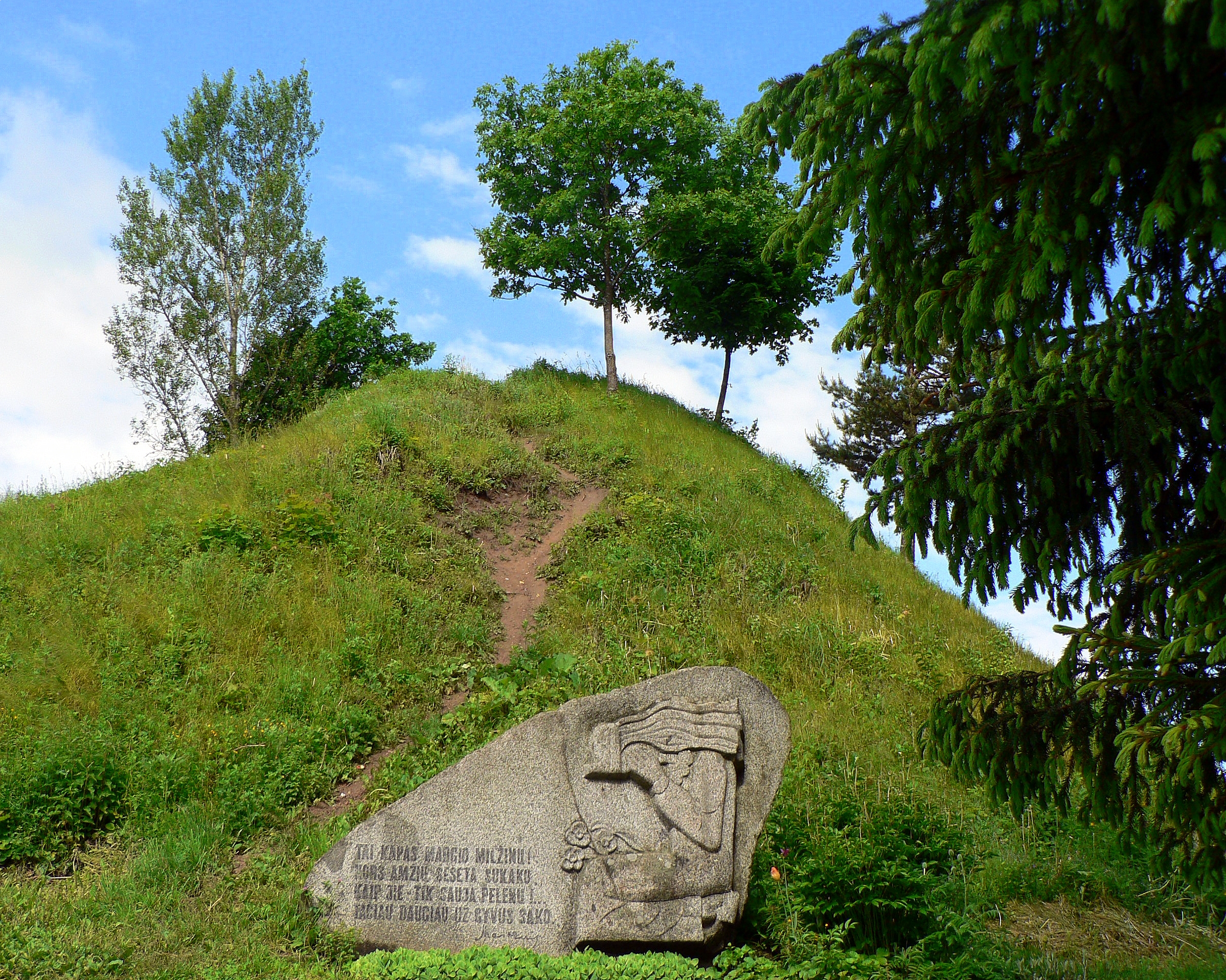
Punia hill fort bears Margiris' name and is one of the traditional locations of Pilėnai

The Teutonic Order waged the decades-long Lithuanian Crusade against the pagan Grand Duchy of Lithuania in hopes of converting it to Christianity. In early 1336, the Order organized another large campaign into Lithuania. Their force included Louis, Margrave of Brandenburg, counts of Henneberg (most likely Johann I, Count of Henneberg) and Namur (most likely Guy II, Marquis of Namur), and other nobles from France and Austria. In total, according to Wigand of Marburg, there were 200 nobles. Another German chronicle, known as Der Chronist von Wolfenbüttel, counted a total of 6,000 soldiers.

On the feast day of Saint Matthias (February 25), this large force attacked Pilėnai, located in Trapėnai land, where some 4,000 people from four different lands sought shelter from the invasion. Wigand's description of further events paints a chaotic and bloody scene. He claims that the people panicked as soon as they saw the Christian army and decided to burn their belongings and commit suicide. It was said that one old woman killed a hundred people with an ax before killing herself. Others managed to escape on horseback. Duke Margiris attempted to organize defense, but soon was overwhelmed by the attackers who threw burning wood and stones into the fortress. Margiris then cut his wife with a sword, threw her body into the fire, and killed his loyal guards and followers. Thus, Pilėnai fell and the Order collected the remaining prisoners and loot. Kurze Reimchronik von Preussen mentioned that 5,000 people were killed and only a handful escaped.

That is all of the information available from contemporary sources. Later historians and authors added many heroic and dramatic details. For example, they added a large pyre and murder of children and women; the 4,000 people seeking shelter in the fortress became 4,000 armed soldiers; Lithuanians bravely and determinedly defended the fortress but chose death over converting to Christianity and becoming slaves of the Order; Margiris cut his wife in half and then killed himself; the Teutonic soldiers were moved by the terrible sight and noble sacrifice and returned to Prussia without loot. Possibly some of these details were inspired by similar events from the antiquity, including mass suicides in Astapa following the destruction of Illiturgis (206 BC), to "death or victory" defense of Abydos (200 BC), and mass suicide during the desperate siege of Masada (c. 74 CE).

It is difficult, if not impossible, to objectively evaluate the events as all that is known about Pilėnai comes from a single source, a German chronicler who saw Lithuanians as heathens and enemies. While there is written evidence about suicides in medieval Lithuania, Pilėnai is the only known instance where a ruler killed his own men.

== Location ==
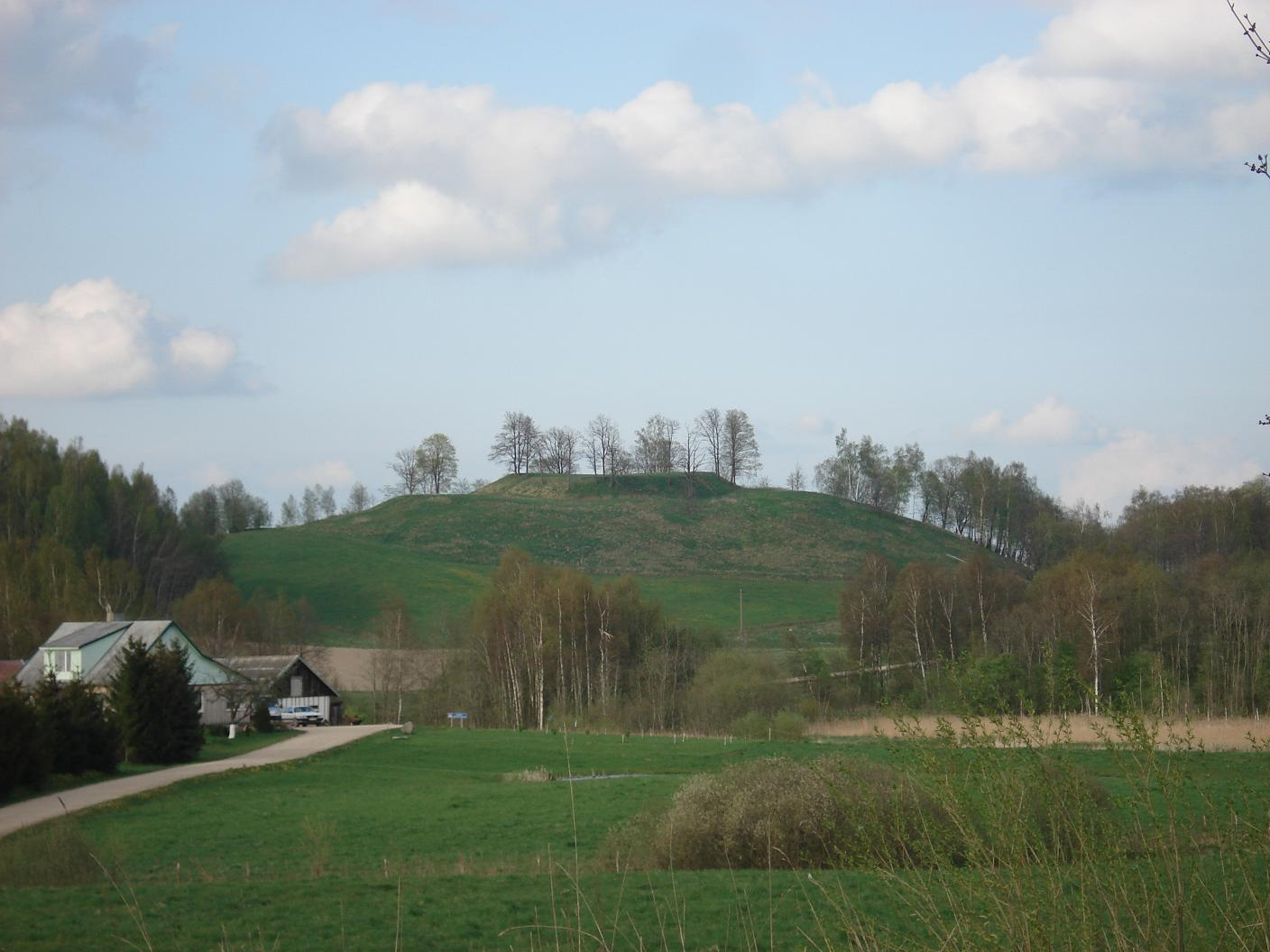
Bilionys hill fort

The exact location of Pilėnai is unknown and historians propose many different locations. Annalista Thorunensis and Wigand of Marburg mentioned that it was located in Trapėnai land (terra Troppen) but its location is also unknown.

Maciej Stryjkowski (1547–1593) identified Punia as the location of Pilėnai (54°30′43″N 24°05′25″E). This opinion, while not based on any historical arguments, spread widely to historical works and was popularized by various works of fiction. Punia hill fort became known as Margiris Hill and in 1973 a monument was erected in memory of Margiris (the monument is inscribed with four lines from a poem by Maironis). The town organizes events to commemorate the events of 1336.

Based on superficial etymological connections, Teodor Narbutt identified Pilėnai with Pilionys (Naujaupis) hill fort in the Kėdainiai District (55°29′12″N 23°47′49″E) and Jonas Basanavičius with Piliakalniai hill fort in the Vilkaviškis District (54°27′56″N 23°02′52″E). Zenonas Ivinskis searched for Pilėnai along the lower reaches of the Neman River. He agreed with Kazys Paunksnis and identified Pilėnai with the Pypliai hill fort near the confluence of Nevėžis and Neman (54°55′38″N 23°45′02″E).

Alvydas Nikžentaitis focused on the location of Trapėnai and determined that it was a triangle between Viešvilė, Ančia River (tributary of Šešuvis), and Veliuona. Further, he paid particular attention to Ycoine mentioned by Jean d'Outremeuse in connection with Margiris' duel with King John of Bohemia in 1329 and identified it with Jūkainiai village in the Raseiniai District. There are five hill forts within a 10 km (6.2 mi) distance from Jūkainiai, including the Molavėnai-Graužai hill fort (55°26′52″N 22°52′07″E). In 1995, Gintautas Zabiela organized a survey of these hill forts and determined that one of them is likely not even a hill fort and other three, including Molavėnai, lacked sufficient cultural layer and archaeological artifacts. An archaeological excavation of Molavėnai outer bailey in 2009 found only a few minor items (fragments of clay pots, pieces of iron, stone grinders) that are dated to the 1st–5th century. Excavation of 10 m^{2} (110 sq ft) of the upper bailey produced no artifacts but revealed up to 1.5 m (4 ft 11 in) thick layer of clay (cf. earthen floor) used to increase hill fort's height which would date it to the second half of the 14th century.

According to Zabiela's survey in 1995, the fifth hill fort, Ižiniškiai (55°24′25″N 22°48′53″E), is now severely damaged by erosion and human activities but was a strong hill fort with a large settlement. Zabiela surveyed additional six hill forts in 1996, including Ivangėnai-Karšuva hill fort near Skaudvilė (55°25′19″N 22°36′16″E) but concluded that Ižiniškiai remained the most probable location of Pilėnai. Tomas Baranauskas disagreed with Nikžentaitis' analysis and searched for Pilėnai in the area of five hill forts that, according to Guillaume de Machaut, were captured by the Teutonic campaign to Medvėgalis in 1329. He concluded that Pilėnai stood in Pilės hill fort near Kaltinėnai in Tauragė District (55°34′1″N 22°26′01″E). However, an excavation of 8.5 m^{2} (91 sq ft) area in 1990 produced no artifacts.

Bilionys hill fort in the Šilalė District (55°35′49″N 22°19′17″E) was first suggested by German historian Johannes Voigt. This version is supported by Stasys Kasparavičius who noted that Bilionys is sometimes known as Pilionys and is very similar to Pillenen mentioned in written sources. Additionally, Bilionys is located just 6 km (3.7 mi) south of Medvėgalis which was attacked in 1329 and also likely defended by Margiris. Bilionys must have been a large and strong fortress as its upper bailey 57 m × 37 m (187 ft × 121 ft) but there is no mention in written sources that it was attacked while neighboring hill forts were attacked several times. However, etymological connection between Bilionys and Pilėnai is dubious as the toponym Bilionys likely derived from a personal name. Nevertheless, since 2012 Verkiai Regional Park organizes events to commemorate Pilėnai on Bilionys hill fort.

== Cultural significance ==
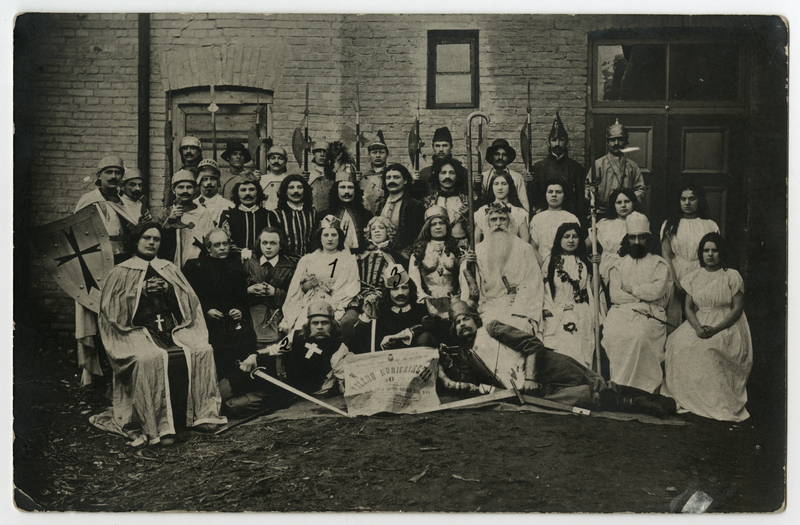
Postcard with actors of the play "Pilėnai" (staged in 1910 by the Varpas Society in Šiauliai)

The heroic defense of Pilėnai inspired many artistic works. The events were described by Władysław Syrokomla in his epic poem Margier (1855). The 4000-line poem inspired an opera by Konstanty Gorski which premiered in 1927. The poem also prompted novel Kunigas (1881) by Józef Ignacy Kraszewski. This novel, in turn, inspired an opera by Marcelinas Šikšnys (1905). In 1933, Vincas Krėvė-Mickevičius published a collection of legends from Dainava, including a story about Pilėnai. Maironis and Paulius Širvys composed short poems on the events.

The opera Pilėnai was written by the musical composer Vytautas Klova, and the libretto was written by Jonas Mackonis. The opera premiered in 1956, and is often performed in Lithuania. In 2001 the performances took place at the Trakai Island Castle. The Lithuanian Opera Company of Chicago performed the work in 2006 to commemorate its 50th anniversary.

In 2002, there was a proposal to create Duke Margiris state award for defending Lithuanian independence with emphasis on loyalty and sacrifice. It was intended for members of armed and unarmed resistance during the Soviet and Nazi Germany occupations in 1940–90.

== Historiography ==
The story of Pilėnai spread from one history book to another, from Simon Grunau, Maciej Stryjkowski, Albert Wijuk Kojałowicz, to Teodor Narbutt, but these are just retellings and embellishments of Wigand's original information.
