= Margiris =

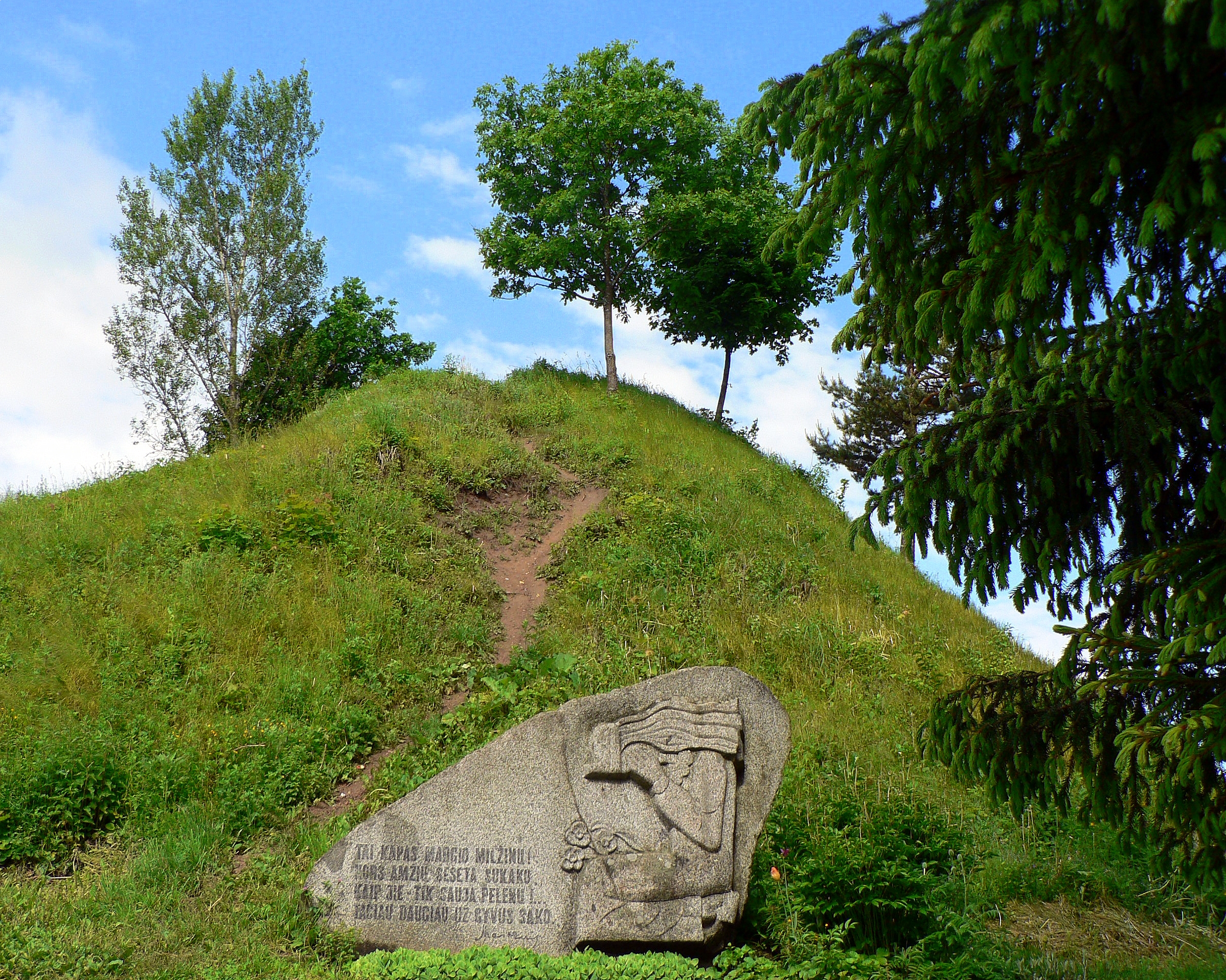
Hill of Margiris in Punia, the traditional location for Pilėnai castle

Margiris or Margis (died 25 February 1336) was a medieval Lithuanian/Samogitian prince, mentioned by Caspar Schütz, via Wigand of Marburg, as the heroic defender of Pilėnai fortress in 1336. Not able to defend the fortress against the Teutonic Order, Margiris and other defenders decided to commit a mass suicide, burning the castle and leaving no loot for the enemy. This episode from the Lithuanian Crusade was popularized during the 19th-century wave of romantic nationalism and Margiris is treated as a national hero in Lithuania.

== Biography ==
Very little is known about Margiris' life. In primary written sources his name is mentioned only twice, in 1329 as Margalis by chronicler Jean d'Outremeuse in Ly myreur des histors and as Marger in 1336 by Caspar Schütz in Historia Rerum Prussicarum.

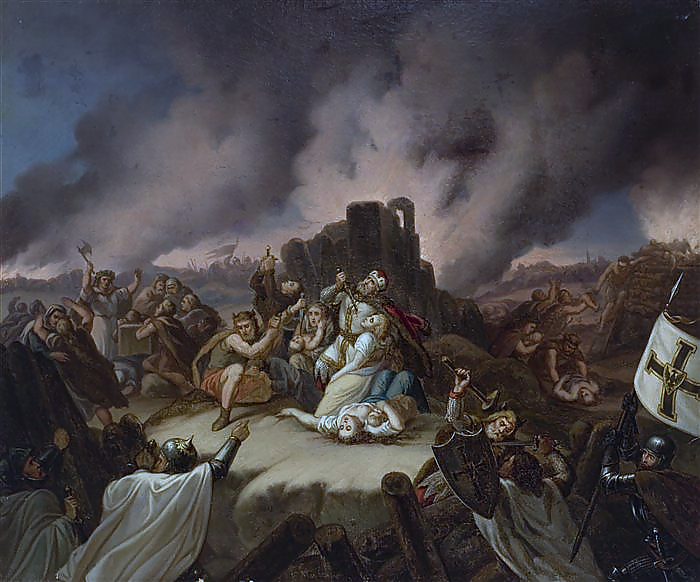
Duke Margiris defending Pilėnai against the Teutonic Order by Władysław Majeranowski (1817–1874)

In early 1329, John of Luxemburg, King of Bohemia, joined the Teutonic crusade against Lithuania and captured Medvėgalis. During the campaign, King John was challenged to a duel by a Lithuanian. This incident is briefly mentioned in several contemporary chronicles, including those by Francis of Prague and Peter of Zittau, but described in detail only by Jean d'Outremeuse. After the rules of the duel were broken, Margiris had to pay a ransom. He did so with coins minted by Louis IV, Holy Roman Emperor, which were most likely stolen during the 1326 Lithuanian raid into Brandenburg. Chronicler d'Outremeuse further briefly mentions Margiris' son who went to France and married a countess of Clermont. Based on this information, Lithuanian historian Alvydas Nikžentaitis concluded that Margiris held a high position in the Lithuanian society or King of Bohemia would not have accepted him as an equal and would have refused to duel him, and Margiris would not have obtained a share of the spoils of war. Nikžentaitis further stipulated that Margiris might have been a son of Butvydas and brother of Gediminas, Grand Duke of Lithuania. However, other historians noted that d'Outremeuse's work resembles more a work of literary fiction than a historically accurate chronicle and expressed doubts whether this Margalis is identical to Margiris.

In February 1336, Teutonic Order organized another large campaign into Lithuania. Their force included Louis, Margrave of Brandenburg, counts of Henneberg and Namur, and other nobles from France and Austria. In total, according to Wigand of Marburg, there were 200 nobles. Another German chronicle, known as Der Chronist von Wolfenbüttel, counted a total of 6,000 soldiers. This force attacked Pilėnai fortress (its location is not known). Wigand of Marburg mentioned that the fortress held 4,000 people. They attempted to organize defense, but the Teutonic force was too strong. Seeing no hope, the defenders decided to burn their property and commit mass suicide. Wigand described a Lithuanian duke (his name was skipped in the surviving Latin translation of Wigand's chronicle) who continued to resist until the end. He then killed his wife and his loyal guards. Caspar Schütz, who used Wigund's original, elaborated on the battle, adding more dramatic and heroic details. Schütz specified the duke's name (Marger or Margiris) and that he killed himself. Margiris and his heroic tale of desperate defense and sacrifice has spread, inspired other works, including the Polish epic poem Margier by Władysław Syrokomla in 1855, and became popular in Lithuania.

== See also ==
- Family of Gediminas – probable family tree of Margiris
