= Siege of Medvėgalis =

1329 siege in Lithuania

- Part of the Lithuanian Crusade
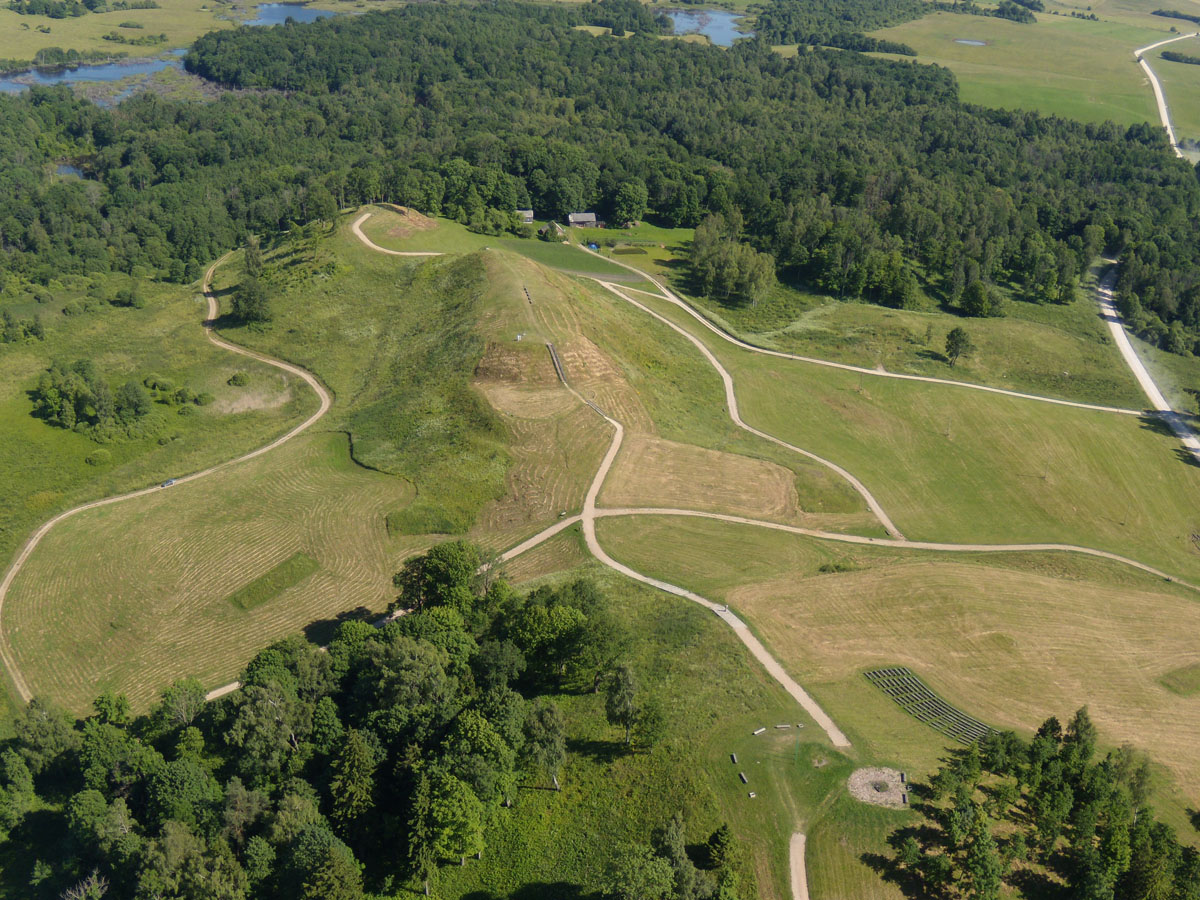
- Medvėgalis hillfort in 2010
Date	1 February 1329
Location	Medvėgalis 55°37′44″N 22°23′19″E
Result	Teutonic victory

Belligerents
Samogitia	Teutonic Order

Commanders and leaders
Unknown	Werner von Orseln and John of Bohemia

Strength
3,000 to 6,000	350 knights and 18,000 soldiers

The Teutonic Order conducted a siege of Medvėgalis, a Lithuanian fortress in Samogitia, in February 1329. The 18,000-strong Teutonic army — reinforced by many guest crusaders, including King John of Bohemia — captured four Lithuanian fortresses and besieged Medvėgalis. The fortress surrendered, and as many as 6,000 locals were baptized in the Catholic rite. The campaign, which lasted a little more than a week, was cut short by a Polish attack on Prussia in the Polish–Teutonic War (1326–1332). When the Teutonic army returned to Prussia, the Lithuanians returned to their pagan practices and beliefs.

== Background ==
Medvėgalis was one of the strongest and most important Lithuanian fortresses in Samogitia. First mentioned in written sources in 1316, the Teutonic Knights attacked it about 20 times.

After the victorious Battle of Medininkai in 1320, Lithuania concluded a truce with the Knights. The Teutons resumed military incursions into Lithuania in 1328. On 1 January 1329, King John of Bohemia arrived at Toruń wishing to engage in the holy crusade against pagan Grand Duchy of Lithuania. Back in 1325, he had promised Pope John XXII to launch another crusade and received permission to collect papal income tax for three years to finance the crusade. He brought many noblemen, including Walter VI, Count of Brienne, and Bolesław III the Generous with his brothers, and soldiers from Silesia, Germany, England. The king also brought poet Guillaume de Machaut so that his exploits could be memorialized in poems and songs (the campaign was described in Confort d'ami written in 1357). According to Peter von Dusburg, the Teutonic army, which marched towards Medvėgalis Castle, numbered 350 knights and 18,000 foot soldiers. Teutonic ambitions were high as parallels were drawn with King Ottokar II of Bohemia and his 1255 campaign, which resulted in the conquest of the Sambians.

== Campaign ==
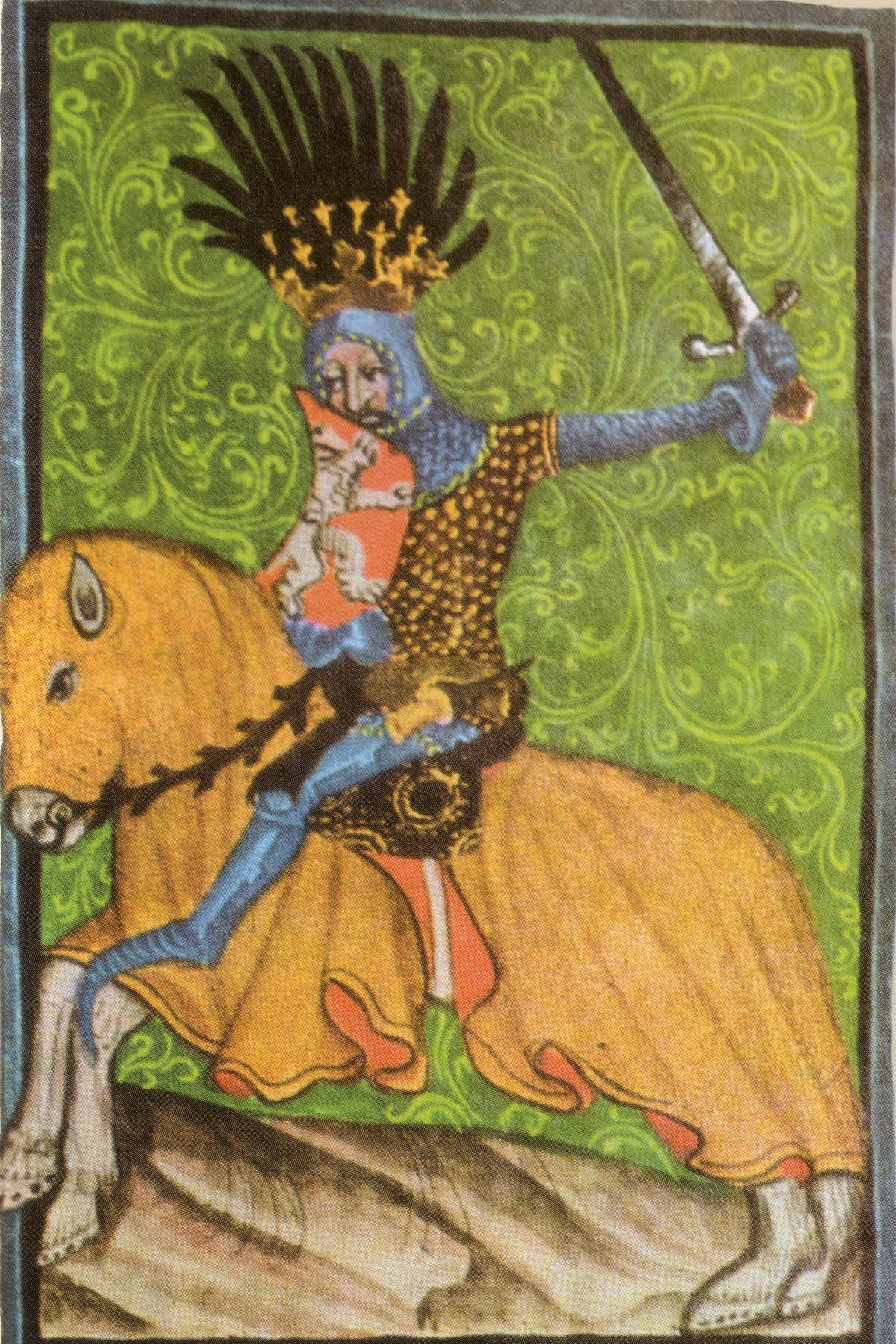
Knightly portrait of King John of Bohemia

According to Jean d'Outremeuse, the vanguard of the Teutonic army first raided and appropriated livestock of Gelindėnai Hillfort in the present-day Plungė District Municipality perhaps in an attempt to provoke a pitched battle. Lithuanians, led by Margiris, pursued the robbers and engaged in a battle. However, the main forces soon joined the Teutonic vanguard, and the Lithuanians faced a slaughter. Recognizing King John, who had a reputation for participating in tournaments, Margiris challenged him to a face-to-face duel. King John agreed, and they met the next morning. However, Margiris' men attempted to interfere, which was strictly against the rules of chivalry. Margiris then willingly surrendered himself for a ransom, which was paid with coins stolen during the 1326 raid into Brandenburg.

On 1 February, the Teutonic army surrounded Medvėgalis. After the wooden fortress caught fire, Medvėgalis was captured, and defenders were taken captive. Chronicler Wigand of Marburg mentioned that the Grand Master Werner von Orseln wanted to kill them all or at least resettle them in Prussia. King John was instead convinced by the defenders that if they accepted his faith, he would allow them to remain in Medvėgalis. About 6,000 Lithuanian men, women, and children were baptized in the Roman Catholic rite. According to Machaut, the Teutons also captured four other fortresses – Šiauduva (location is debated), Gediminas Castle (located in Kvėdarna), Gegužė, and Aukaimis (Xedeytain, Gedemine, Geguse, Aukaham).

== Aftermath ==
At the same time King Władysław I of Poland, who was allied with the Grand Duke of Lithuania Gediminas, took advantage of the fact that the main Teutonic force was in Lithuania and attacked Chełmno Land (Kulmerland). Plans for a further military campaign in Samogitia were scrapped and the Teutonic army returned home to deal with the war with Poland. The entire campaign in Lithuania lasted a little more than a week. Once the main army left, the Lithuanians easily defeated the small garrison left to hold the fortress and resumed practicing their pagan beliefs. King John returned to Prussia to crusade against Lithuania twice, in 1337 and 1345.

The siege was fictionalized by the Lithuanian writer Antanas Vienuolis in 1956.
