= Lithuanian Crusade =

13th–15th century military campaigns by the Teutonic Order

- Part of the Northern Crusades
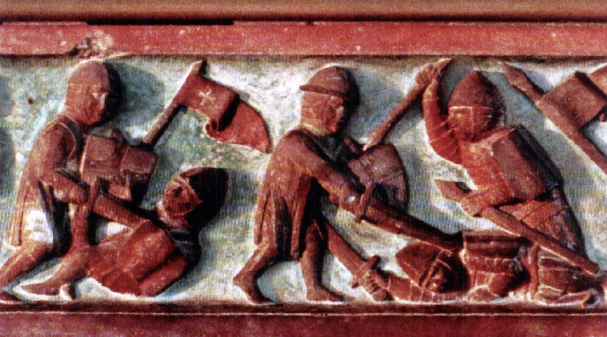
- Lithuanians fighting Teutonic knights (14th-century bas-relief from Malbork Castle)
Date	1283–1422
Location	Lithuania; Samogitia; Prussia; Livonia
Result	Lithuanian victory
Territorial changes	Treaty of Melno

Belligerents
Teutonic Order; Livonian Order; Allies: Kingdom of Hungary; Kingdom of Bohemia; Margraviate of Moravia; Hainaut-Holland; Lower Bavaria; Duchy of Austria; Kingdom of England	Grand Duchy of Lithuania; Duchy of Samogitia; Allies: Kingdom of Poland (since 1385); Principality of Moldavia (1422); Vassals: Principality of Smolensk; Tatars from Golden Horde

Commanders and leaders
Grand Master of the Teutonic Order; Allies: King Louis of Hungary; King John of Bohemia; Charles of Moravia; William II of Hainaut and Holland; Peter of Bourbon; Henry of Lower Bavaria; Albert III of Austria; Henry IV of England	Grand Duke of Lithuania King of Poland

Casualties and losses
Unknown	Unknown

The Lithuanian Crusade was a series of campaigns by the Teutonic Order and the Livonian Order under the pretext of forcibly Christianizing the pagan Grand Duchy of Lithuania. The Livonian Order occupied Riga in 1202 and in the 1230s they settled in Chełmno Land, a fief of Poland. They first conquered other neighboring Baltic tribes—proto-Latvians (Curonians, Semigallians, Latgalians, Selonians) and Old Prussians—in the Livonian and Prussian crusades.

The first raid against the Lithuanians and Samogitians was in 1208. From then on, the orders played a key role in Lithuanian politics, but they were not a direct threat until the 1280s. By that time, the Grand Duchy of Lithuania was already a centralized state and could mount defenses. For the next century, the order organized annual colonialist reise (raids) into Samogitian and Lithuanian lands, without great success but at immense human cost. Border regions in Samogitia and Suvalkija became sparsely inhabited wilderness due to ethnic cleansing, although the order gained very little territory. The resulting wars between the Teutonic Order and Lithuania were one of the longest conflicts in the history of Europe.

The grand duchy finally converted to Christianity in 1386, when Grand Duke Jogaila accepted baptism from Poland before his wedding to reigning Queen Jadwiga and coronation as king of Poland. However, the baptism did not stop the crusade, as the order publicly challenged the sincerity of the conversion at the papal court. Lithuania and its new ally, Poland, defeated the order in the decisive Battle of Grunwald in 1410, which is often cited as the end of the Lithuanian Crusade and the Polish–Lithuanian–Teutonic War. The final peace was reached by the Treaty of Melno (1422), ending 225 years of warfare.

== Background ==
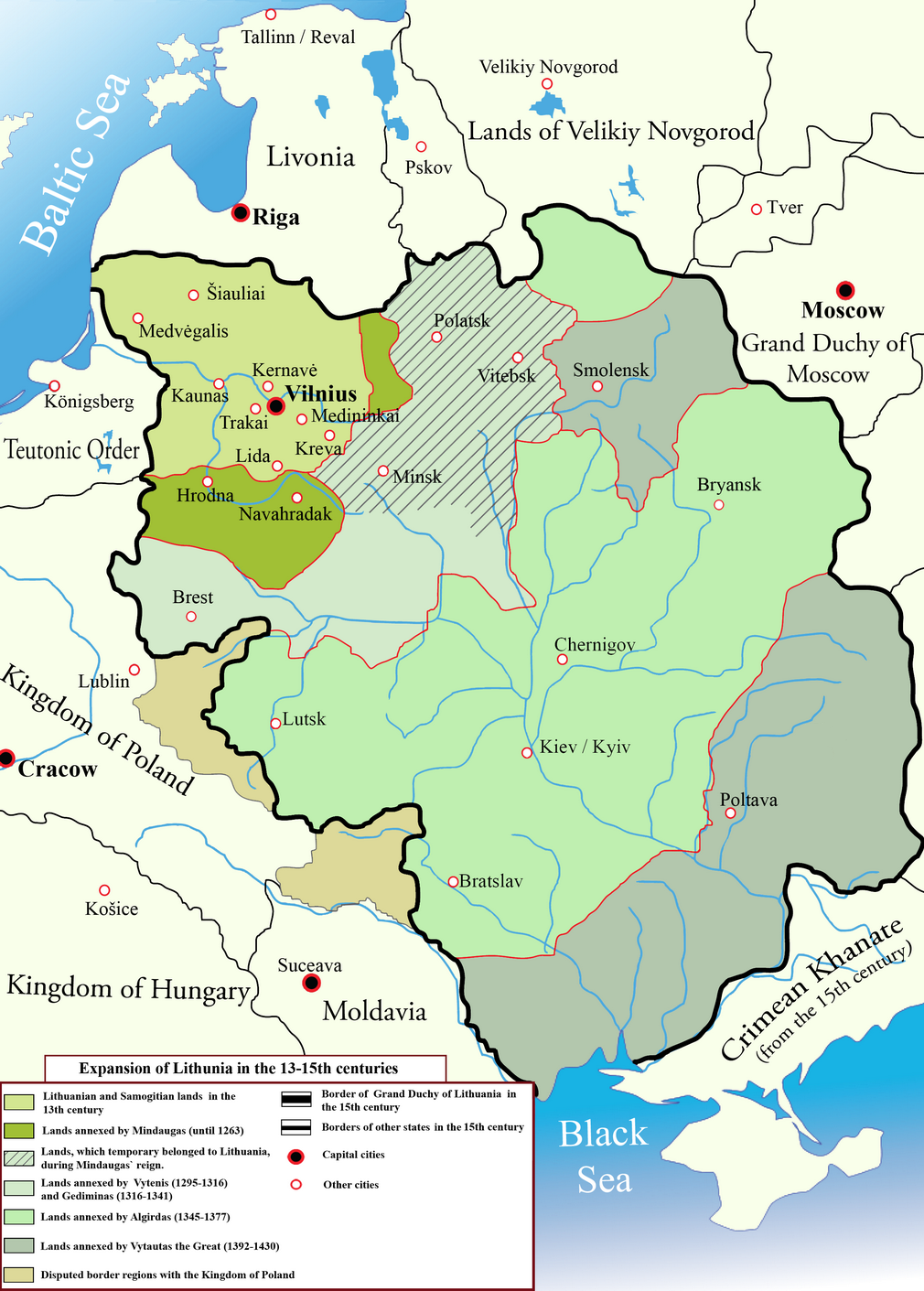
Changes in the territory of Lithuania from the 13th to 15th century. At its peak, Lithuania was the largest state in Europe.

Crusaders claimed to wage war to convert non-Christian "infidels" to Christianity by force. In the 12th century, St. Bernard of Clairvaux wrote to the Knights Templar in the Levant that the killing of pagans was also justified: "The Christian glories in the death of the pagan, because Christ is glorified." Only in the 15th century, with the Council of Constance, would that view be contested and a discussion on the rights of pagans begun. Lithuania itself accepted various religions—during the reign of kings Mindaugas and Gediminas, Franciscan and Dominican monasteries had already been established in Lithuania with Lithuanian monks. In his letters to the pope, Gediminas complained that crusaders destroyed Christian churches to have a pretext for war.

The Baltic Crusade started in 1197. The first encounters of militant Christian missionaries with the Lithuanians occurred in 1185, when Saint Meinhard was attacked by the Lithuanians. Lithuanian troops were also supporting the local resistance of Semigallians and Latgalians. The Teutonic Order was given land near Toruń in the 1220s by Konrad I of Masovia, bringing the crusaders closer to Lithuanian lands. With the arrival of the first Teutonic crusaders, led by Hermann Balk, in Chełmno Land in 1230, the religious traditions of modern-day Estonia and Latvia began to slowly turn towards Catholicism. There had already been shared religious beliefs between the Germanic and Lithuanian peoples, like the veneration of the god Perkūnas.

In the 1230s, there were military clashes between the Christians and the Lithuanians near the northern borders of what was then part of Livonia. The Livonian Brothers of the Sword, founded in 1202, began campaigns to expand into the area. Through the Livonian Crusade, they conquered the Terra Mariana that bordered Lithuanian Samogitia, which increased conflicts. Those conflicts reached their apex in 1236 with the Battle of Saule near Šiauliai—the Livonian Brothers of the Sword suffered a disastrous defeat. Only 10% of their army survived and more than 48 of their knights were killed. In light of their defeat and outstanding debts, the order was forced to become a branch of the Teutonic Order called the Livonian Order.

The military campaigns of the reformed Livonian Order against Lithuanians were still unsuccessful. Even with support from the Teutonic Order, the Christian Livonians suffered major defeats in the battles of Durbe (1260), Karuse (1270), and Aizkraukle (1279). These losses weakened the Teutonic Order, allowing for the Great Prussian Uprising. When the converted king of Lithuania, Mindaugas, was assassinated in 1263, the region entered an era of instability. Lithuanians supported the Prussian uprisings and arranged military raids together with Prussians and Yotvingians. These included the 1264 siege of Vėluva (Wehlau) castle in Sambia during the reign of Treniota and the revenge taken against Poland for the Yotvingians, led by Vaišvilkas and Švarnas.

Only in 1283, after the reconquest of the Prussians, did the Teutonic Order focus its campaigns on the fragile, newly formed Kingdom of Lithuania.

== Objectives ==
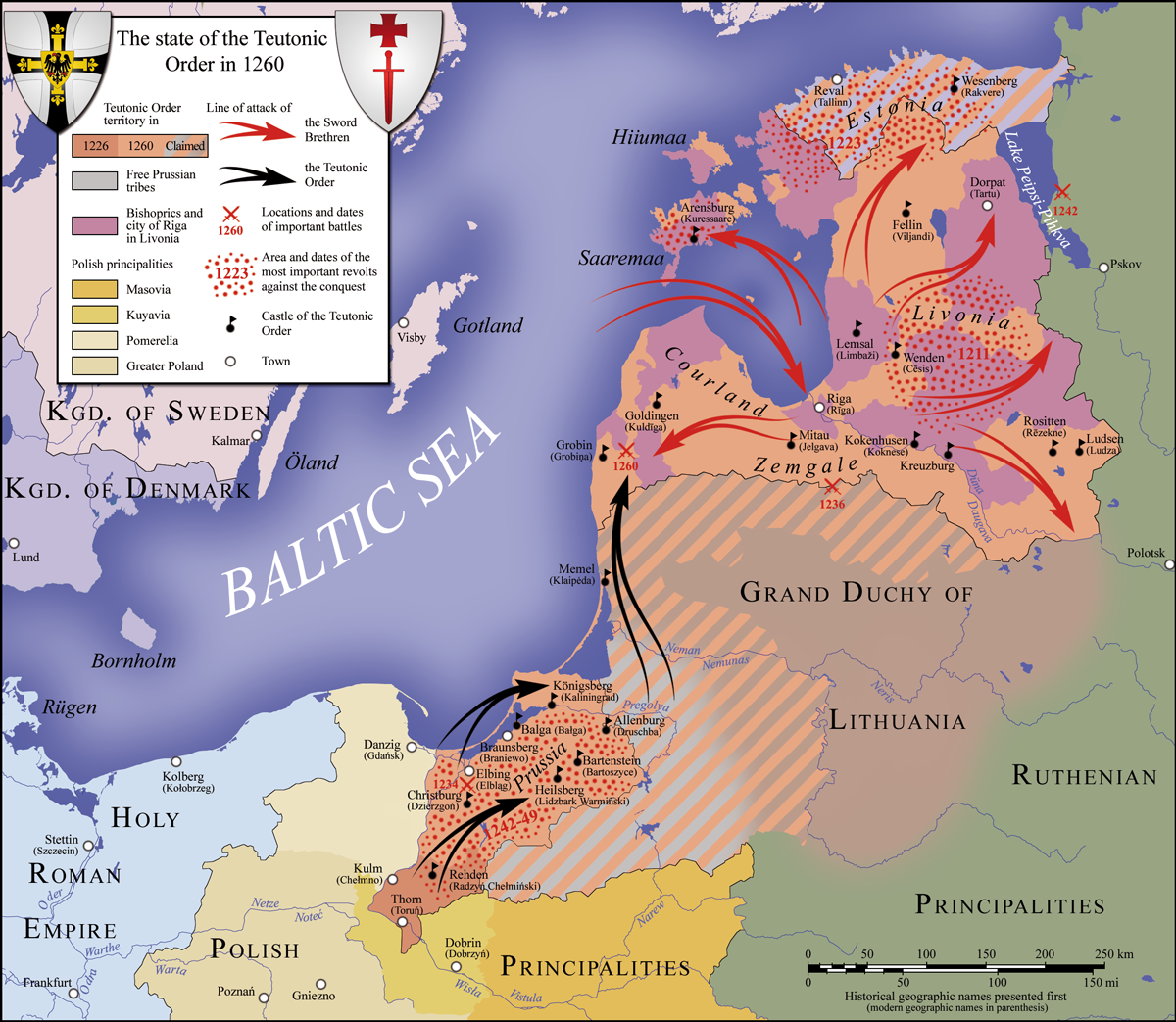
Teutonic State borders in 1226 and 1260, showing how Samogitia divided the order's territories

The Teutonic Order initially planned to incorporate all of Lithuania into the Teutonic State, as it had with Prussia, but those plans faced strong Lithuanian resistance. The Teutonic Order's principal objective was to conquer the Lithuanian lowland region, Samogitia, and build fortresses there to solidify their control. Like a wedge, Samogitia separated the territories conquered by the Teutonic Order and those conquered by the Livonian Order. By subjecting Samogitia, the order would be able to unify its administration of both territories. Starting with the reign of Gediminas, Lithuania also began rapidly expanding eastward, conquering Ruthenian lands and gaining more resources for its long-lasting wars.

For the order, the promotion of Christianity had a strong ideological impetus. When the battles around Jerusalem ceased after the Siege of Acre in 1291, Christian religious groups turned their military efforts toward eastern Europe and the Iberian Peninsula, intent on conquest or reconquest. The Lithuanian rulers vehemently disputed the concept of baptism and regularly carried out raids and conquests on Germanic lands. As a result, the order became focused on suppressing them as a potent, pagan enemy. However, the Teutonic argument for the conversion of Lithuanian pagans became, by the end, mostly a pretext for expansion.

Although they had concentrated their efforts toward the unstable principalities of Belarus and Ukraine, the Lithuanians could not ignore the aggression of the Christian crusaders. Nor could they reach any peaceful agreement with the Teutonic Order, which demanded mass baptisms as a condition for peace. From then on, the defense of Samogitia and other vulnerable regions became a priority for the Lithuanians. The prospect of loot from the Grand Duchy of Lithuania and the State of the Teutonic Order exacerbated the conflict, and the conquests of both sides were often short-lived or haphazard.

== Phases of the conflict ==
=== Beginnings and Vytenis's rule (1283–1315) ===
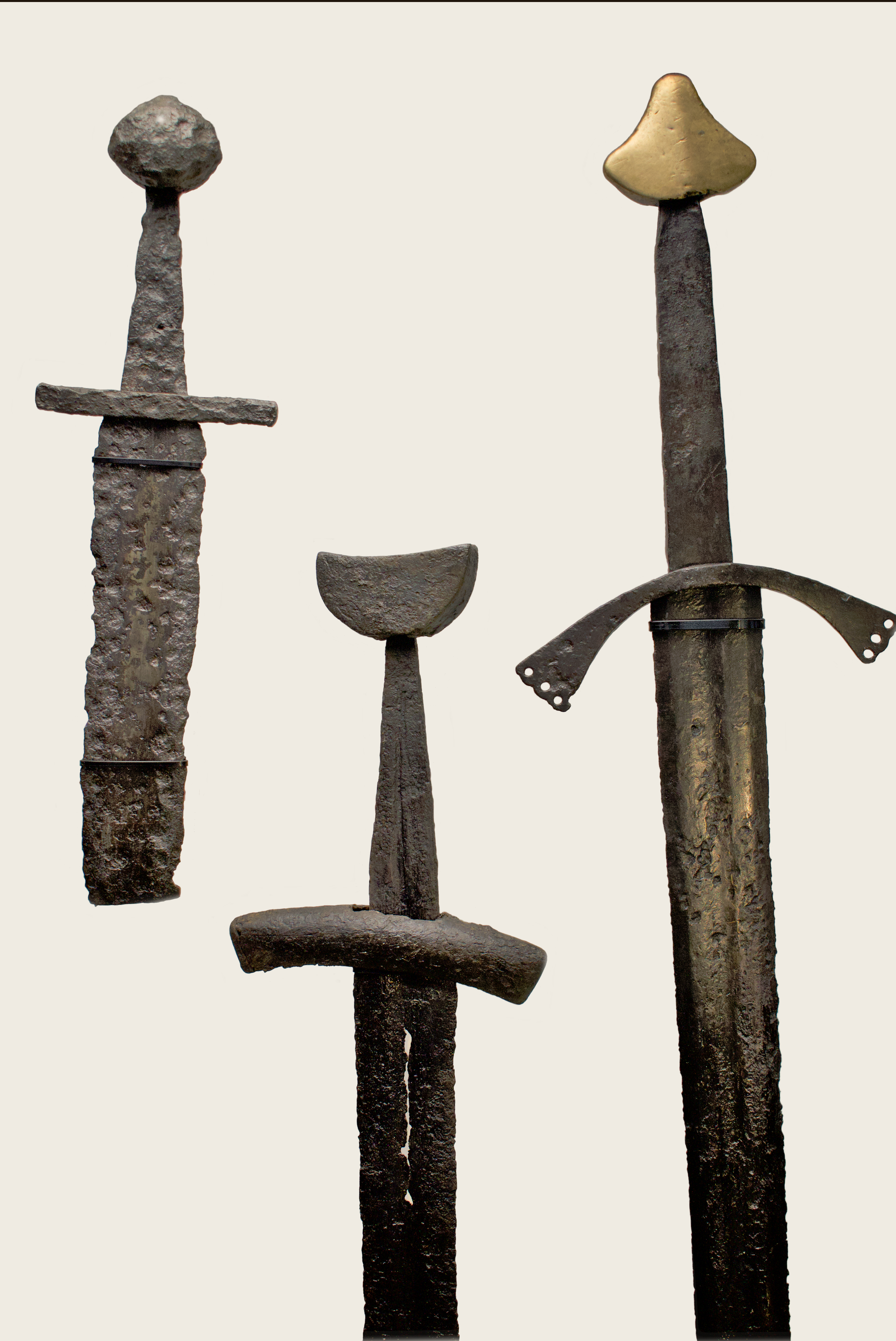
Lithuanian swords, dating to the 13th century

In 1283, chronicler Peter of Dusburg noted that the Teutonic Order finalized its conquest of Prussia and of the Yotvingians. Some Yotvingians retreated to Lithuania, and some the crusaders deported to Sambia. The Lithuanian Crusade began in the winter of 1283.

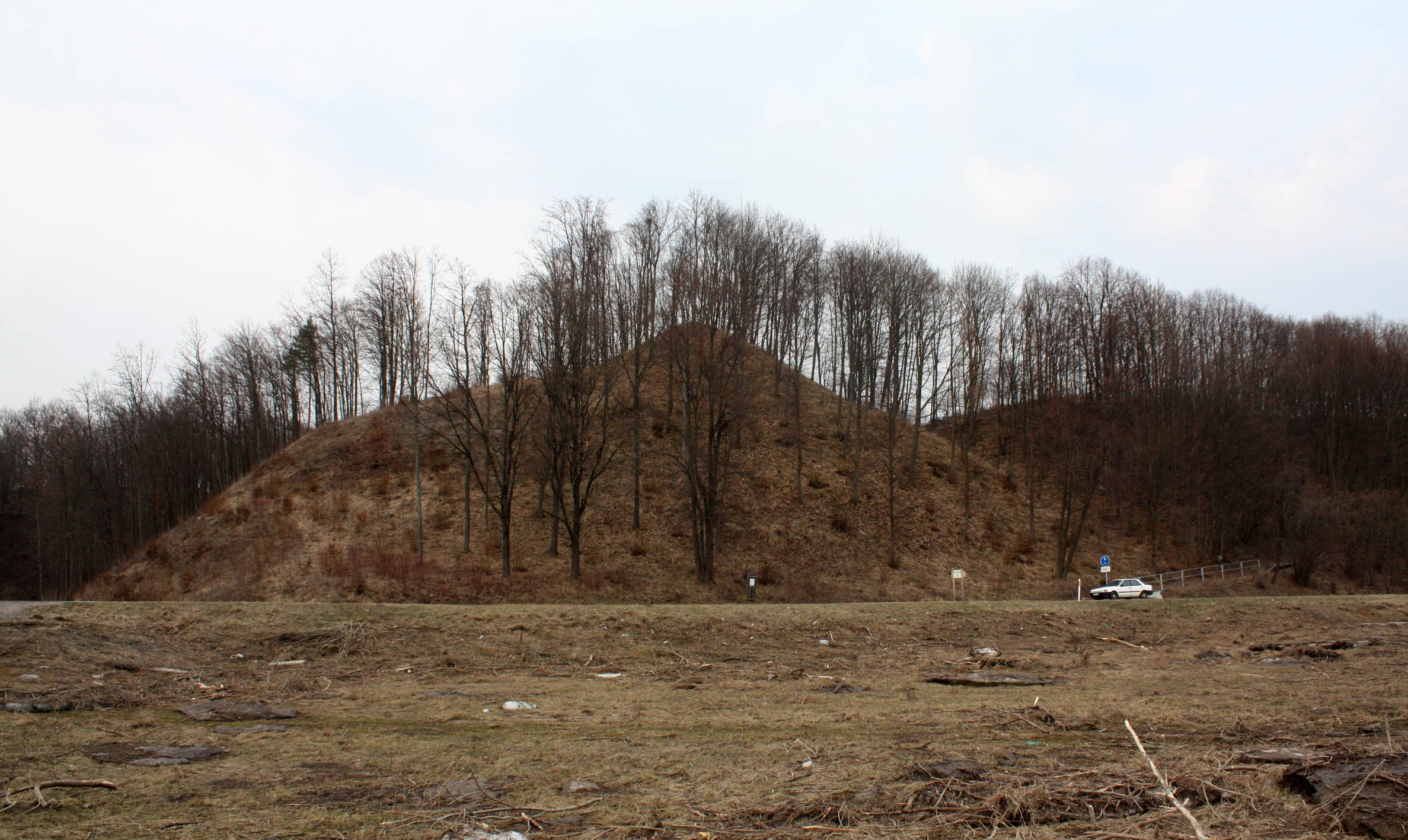
Location of the Bisenė hillfort, 2010

The first target of the Teutons was Bisenė on the western Lithuanian border. Teutonic soldiers commanded by Prussian Landmeister Konrad von Thierberg crossed the frozen Neman River and attacked the Lithuanian fortress in the morning. It fell in the afternoon and was burned to the ground. After the burning of Kolainiai in 1291 and Bisenė in 1316, Junigeda (now called Veliuona) became the westernmost Lithuanian fortress along the river. In 1298, Lithuanian leader Vytenis attacked the Livonian crusaders in Courland, a part of the Archdiocese of Riga. After initial successes by the crusaders, the two sides fought in the Battle of Turaida after Vytenis forged an alliance with the citizens of Riga, a city ostensibly under the control of the Livonian Order.

The conflicts resumed with the coronation of Grand Duke Vytenis of Lithuania in 1303. Vytenis wanted to confront Lithuania's northern and eastern neighbors. He sent 2,000 armed knights to his borders, while isolated Lithuanian troops raided Prussia. More stable after suppressing the Prussian revolts of 1283, the Teutonic Order sent military units to Semigallia and Skalvia, then under Lithuanian control. Several years of relative calm followed until the Teutonic Order decided to strike at Samogitia.

The Teutonic Knights organized around 20 raids into the region. Vytenis took measures to undermine the influence of local Samogitian nobles, evidenced by an increasing number of traitors and refugees. The Livonian Order consolidated its control over Semigallia, where Lithuanians had garrisons since the Battle of Aizkraukle. In 1313, the Livonian Order captured Dynaburg Castle, which the Lithuanians had controlled since 1281.

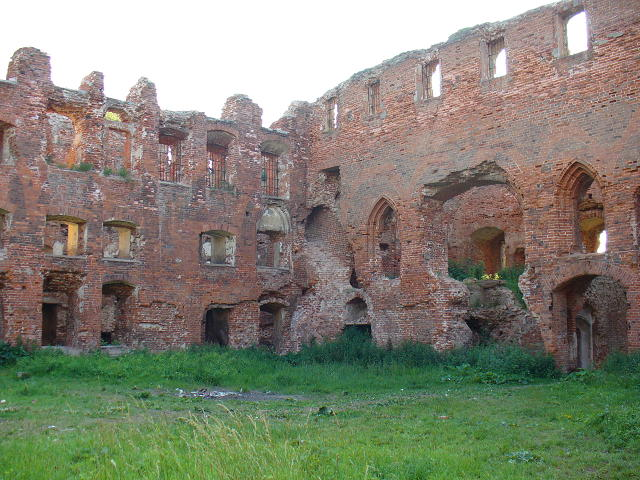
Ruin of a Teutonic fortification in Neman

To better demarcate and defend its eastern border against the Lithuanian advances, the Teutonic Order took to erecting small fortresses and fortified houses. The garrisons often contained a few knights with more soldiers and squires. The defenders left only to raid Lithuanian lands. The forts were menacing just because of their strategic location. Some of the most imposing were in Neman, Sovetsk, and Mayovka.

Vytenis reacted to the movements of the order in 1311 by directing his best cavalry toward Masuria and unreinforced areas of the Prussian border. Despite 4,000 Lithuanian cavalry, they were surprised and expelled by forces led by Landmarschall Heinrich von Plötzke. But the Christian population's general fear of the "savage pagans" did not change with the victory, especially not among German colonists in rural areas of the order's territory. Vytenis's last great attack came in October 1315, shortly before his death.

=== Reign of Gediminas (1316–1345) ===
During Gediminas's rule as grand duke of Lithuania, the war intensified on the northern and western borders with the Teutonic Order. Gediminas allied himself with the king of Poland, Władysław I Łokietek, through a series of marriages in 1325–1328. Poland became more hostile toward the Teutonic Order due to their dispute over the dominion of Pomerania. As a result, Łokietek stipulated an anti-Teutonic defensive military pact with Gediminas in 1330–1331.

In the winter of 1329, King John of Bohemia formed an army to participate in the crusade. Strengthened by this support, the knights of the order were able to capture several important fortresses in Samogitia. Conflicts with the king of Poland and limited contributions from John of Bohemia delayed the conquest of further territories.

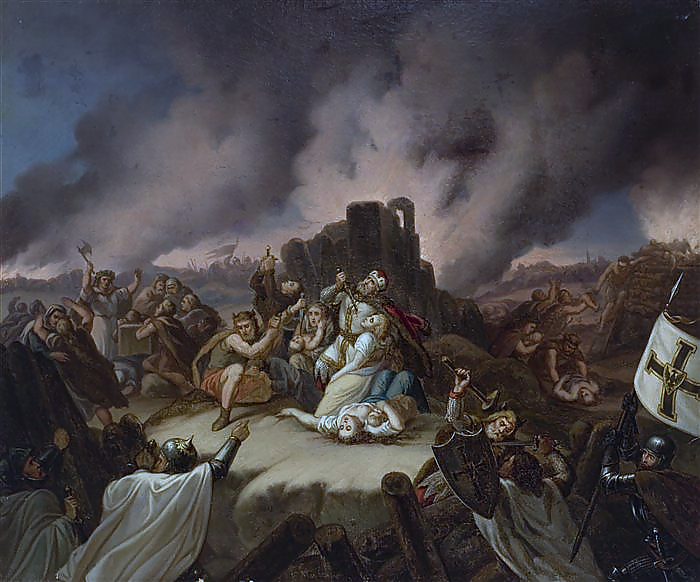
Duke Margiris defending Pilėnai against Teutonic Knights, Władysław Majeranowski, 19th century

Because the conflict between the Teutonic State and Poland had resumed in 1330, the Grand Duchy of Lithuania experienced a respite. The crusaders prevailed against the Polish in Kuyavia in 1331. In 1336, a large army supported by John of Bohemia and his son-in-law, Henry XIV, crossed the Neman in Samogitia and attacked the castle of Pilėnai. Seeing their defeat, the defenders burned the fortress's goods and killed themselves. Once the fortress was conquered, the Teutonic Knights replaced it with a new fortification they baptized Bayernburg (Raudonpilis) in honor of Henry XIV. They hoped the fort would serve as a foothold for further campaigns into the region. After the withdrawal of most of the order's army, Bayernburg was stormed and destroyed by Lithuanian troops led by Gediminas in person. According to local tradition, he was shot by an arrow under an oak tree that still exists outside the fortifications. He more likely died in 1341, a year in which the fighting temporarily subsided.

=== The brothers Algirdas and Kęstutis (1345–1382) ===
The conflict intensified again in 1345 after two sons of Gediminas, Algirdas and Kęstutis, assumed power by ousting their brother, Jaunutis, who had been Gediminas's heir. The two shared control of the territory as a duumvirate: the land to the southeast was controlled by Algirdas and the land to the west (including Samogitia) was administered by Kęstutis. As a result, Kęstutis led most of the fight against the Teutonic Order, with mixed results. In 1349, Teutonic commander Winrich von Kniprode seized a victory against the Lithuanians in the Battle of Strėva, which was held in an open field.

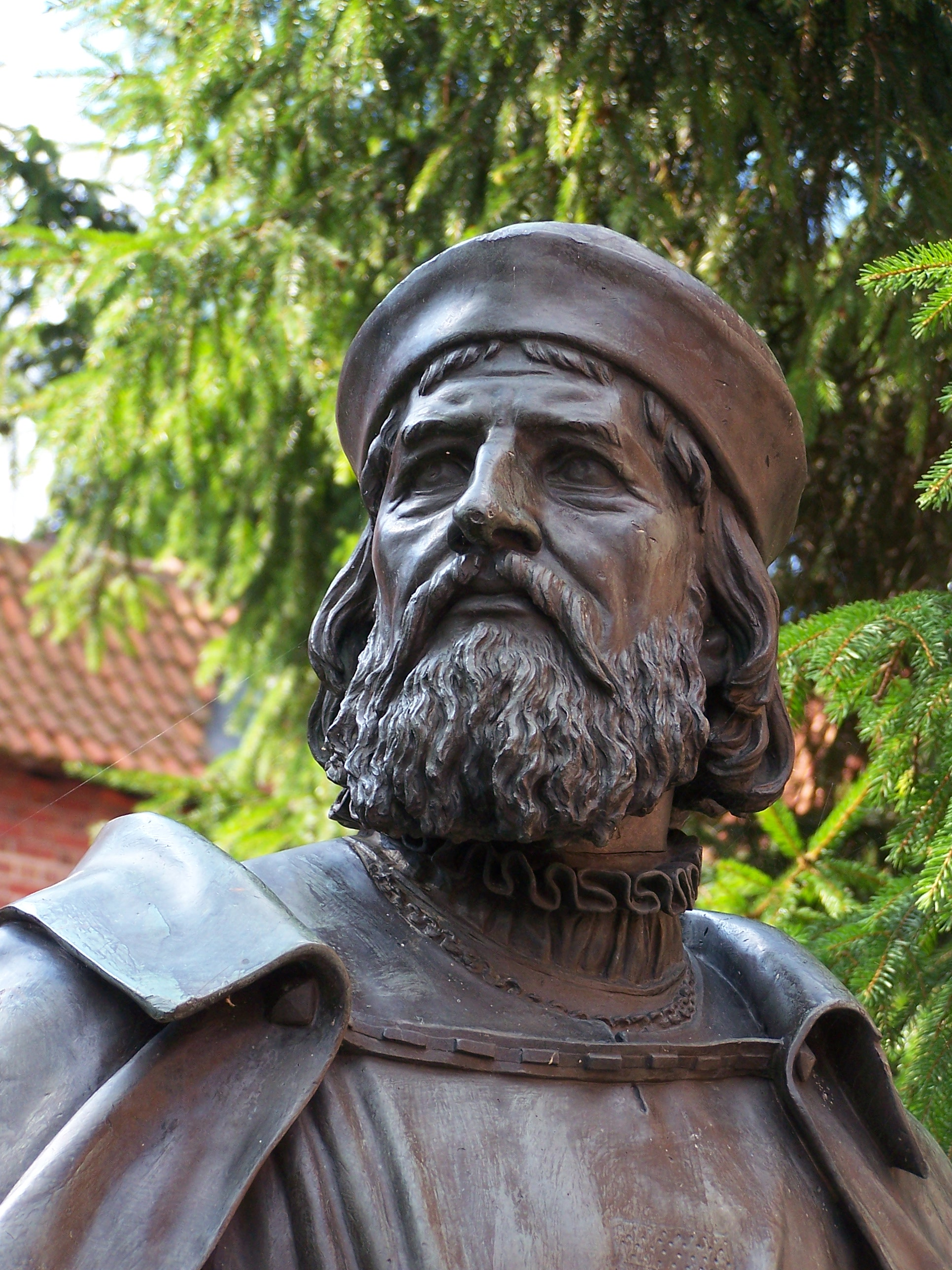
Sculpture of Teutonic commander Winrich von Kniprode

In 1352, led by von Kniprode, now grand master of the Teutonic Order, the Teutonic State began a period of quiet growth and avoided disagreements with the Kingdom of Poland. In 1358, Holy Roman Emperor Charles IV expressed a desire for peace if the Lithuanian sovereign would accept Christianity. Algirdas stipulated the complete withdrawal of the Teutonic Order from the Baltic region, which Charles IV rejected because he needed support from the order. The war only ended in 1361 when a marshal of the order, Henning Schindekopf, and Louis I of Hungary succeeded in capturing Kęstutis. The poet and herald Peter Suchenwirt wrote a poem to commemorate the capture, when Kęstutis apparently swore an oath to convert to Christianity. Kęstutis successfully escaped from his imprisonment in Malbork Castle in 1362.

That April, a Teutonic army destroyed the Kaunas Castle, which was situated well within the borders of the Grand Duchy of Lithuania. That success marked the beginning of a period of mutual devastation that only ended when both adversaries were significantly weakened. Between 1362 and 1370, the crusaders made 20 "punitive expeditions" into Lithuania. (They would complete 52 by 1382.) In response, Kęstutis and Algirdas gathered military contingents from all of Lithuania, from Russian feudal lords faithful to the grand duchy, and from the Tatars who were disposed to help because they shared a border with the Teutonic State near Königsberg.

By February 1370, conditions were right for the large Battle of Rudau. The Teutonic army seized victory despite their inferior numbers because they were more comfortable in open-field combat. Through these advancements, the still well-manned Teutonic Order raided the Lithuanian capital, Vilnius, and populous Trakai. The Lithuanians retaliated with sporadic raids.

=== Lithuanian and Polish power struggles (1386–1409) ===
A new phase began in 1377 with the death of Algirdas. In Lithuania, a power struggle erupted between Algirdas's sons, Kęstutis, and Kęstutis's son Vytautas. Alternating alliances were forged with former opponents to the north and west since the question of Christian conversion had lost energy in the preceding century.

In 1380, with the secret Treaty of Dovydiškės, the Teutonic Order supported Algirdas's heir, Jogaila, against Kęstutis in exchange for various concessions. While Kęstutis remained a prisoner of Jogaila through 1382, Vytautas escaped and fled to his cousin in the Teutonic State, trusting in their help to depose Jogaila and his allies. There, he converted to Christianity.

This power struggle ended in the summer of 1384, leading to a pause as the Christianization of Lithuania progressed. Jogaila went to the Polish nobility, the szlachta, to ask to marry Queen Jadwiga of Poland. Their conversations about the marriage and Jogaila's converting to Christianity created a more stable relationship between Poland and the Grand Duchy of Lithuania. The treaty of the agreement, the Union of Krewo, set the two countries on a path of increasing closeness, eventually leading to the Polish–Lithuanian union. Jogaila was also forced to enter an understanding with his cousin Vytautas to accept Vytautas's claims and return his possessions. Jogaila (now given the name Władysław II Jagiełło) was elected king of Poland after being baptized and marrying Jadwiga in 1386. Lithuania, the last pagan state in Europe, embraced Christianity.

The Lithuanian nobility were skeptical about assimilating into Polish culture, so Jagiełło had to concede more rights to Vytautas, who wanted to expand east into the Grand Duchy of Moscow and needed more freedom for military action. Vytautas transferred his rights to Samogitia to the Teutonic Order in the Treaty of Salynas of 1398. The act was also ratified by Jagiełło as king of Poland in 1404.

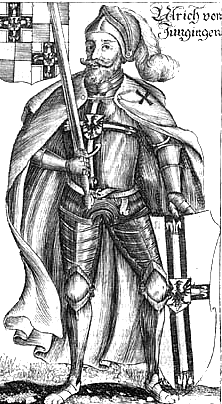
Ulrich von Jungingen, grand master of the Teutonic Order from 1407 to 1410 in a 17th century woodcut

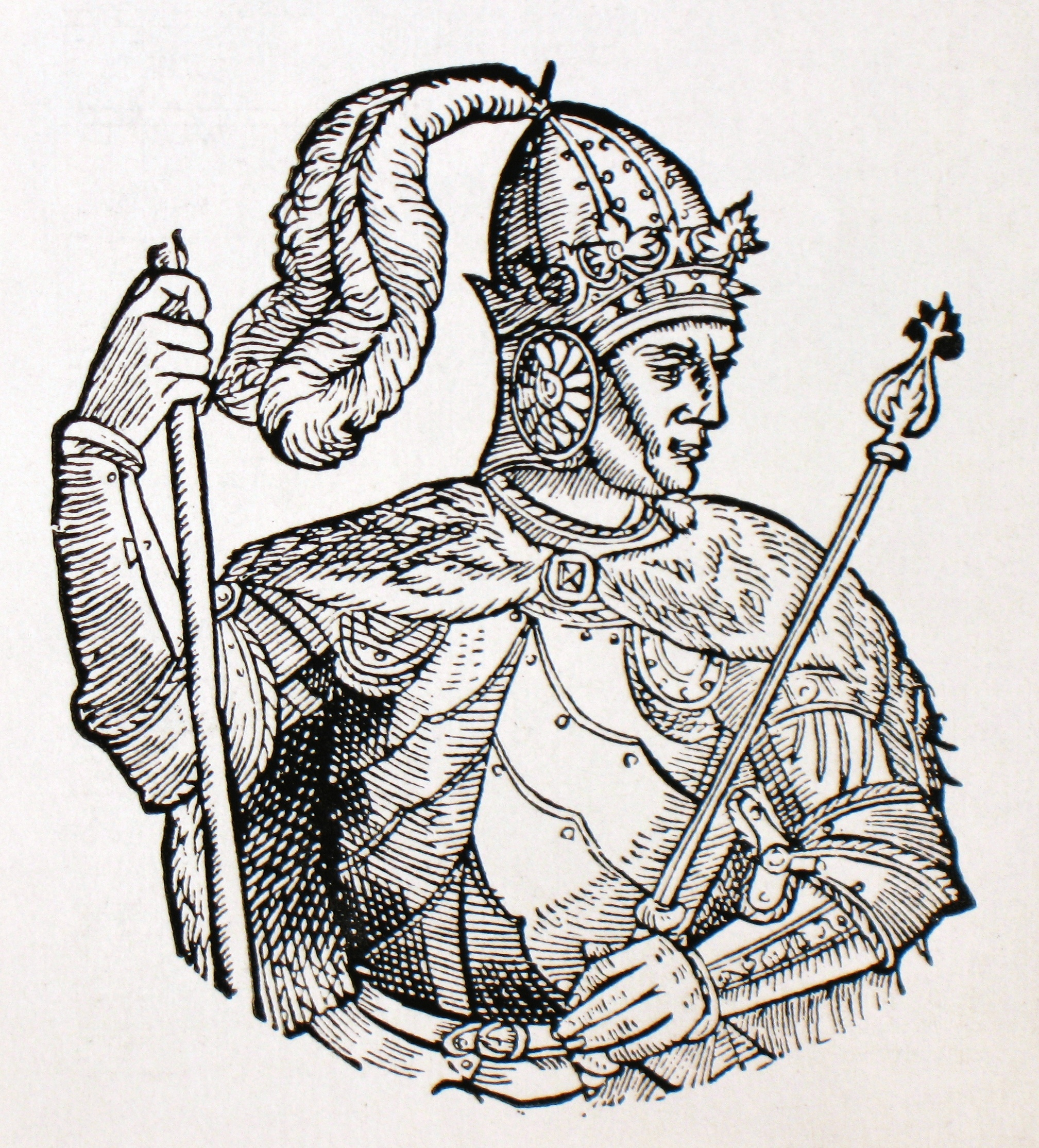
Lithuanian duke Vytautas the Great in 17th century woodcut

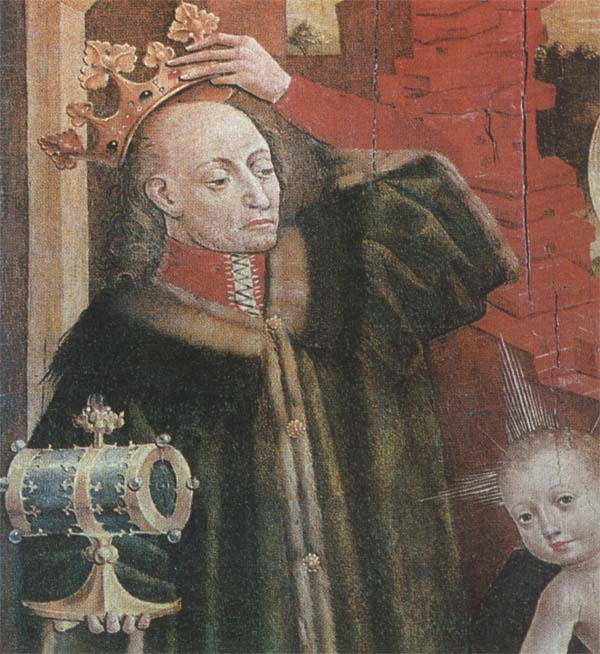
Polish king Władysław II Jagiełło in a 1475–1480 painting

=== Growing instability of the Teutonic Order (1409–1410) ===
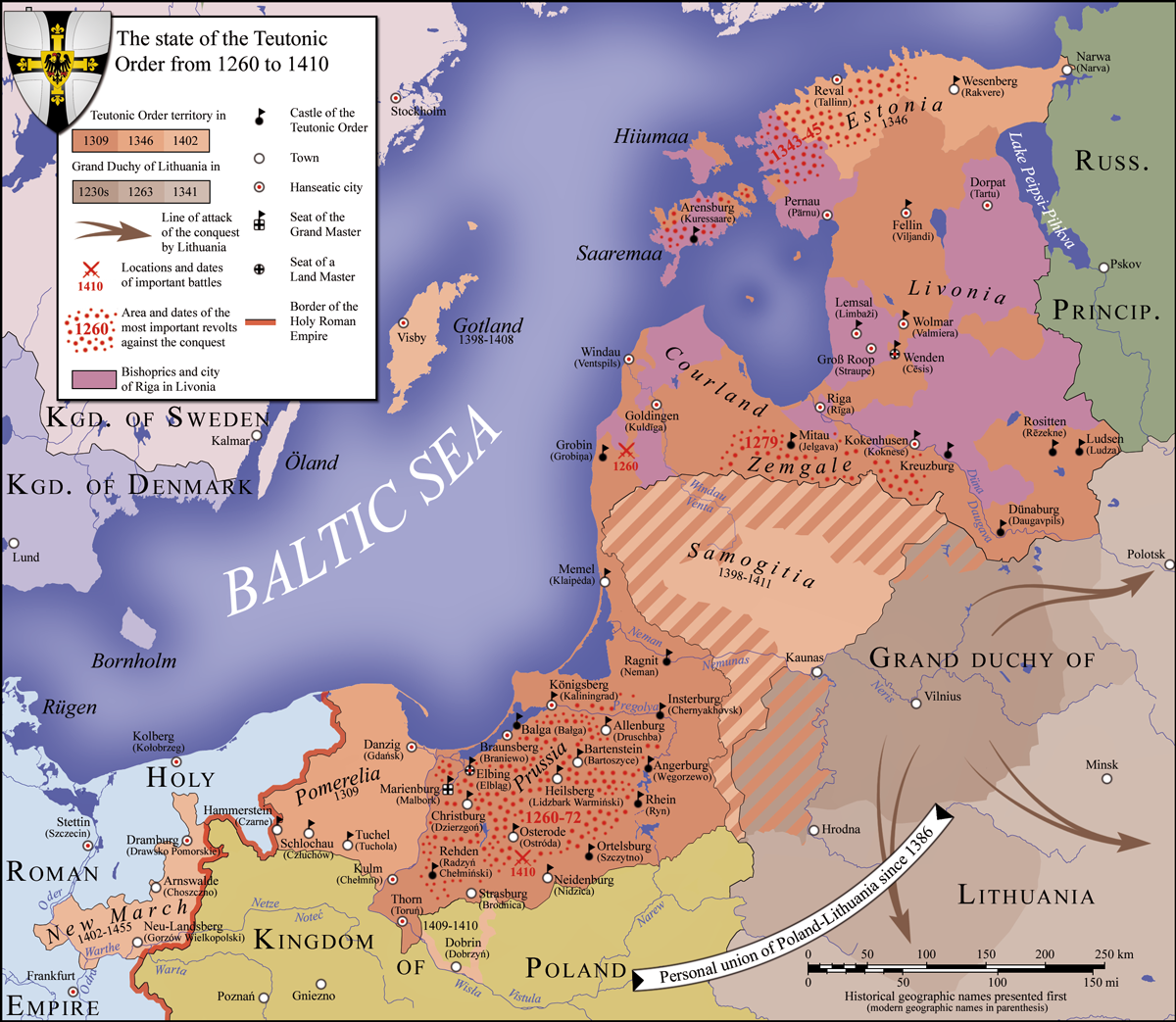
The expansion of the Teutonic Order up to 1410

The leaders of the Teutonic Order were skeptical and uncertain about their future in the region after Jogaila accepted the Polish crown and Christianity while maintaining close ties to Lithuania. These doubts created ideological and military problems for the order. Lithuanian conversion challenged the order's status as fighting against paganism, which it had heralded so much in the preceding decades. The order argued that the Lithuanian baptisms had been only for political goals and that the majority of Lithuanians held on to their traditional beliefs. Denying the possibility of mass baptisms, Vytautas and Jagiełło asked Pope Boniface IX to intervene. The Pope's response arrived in 1403, a papal bull forbidding the Teutonic Knights from declaring war on Lithuania.

The Teutonic Order was worried by the response. The Kingdom of Poland, situated to the south, sheltered the monastic state and allowed it to grow throughout the unstable 15th century. After the order's annexation of Pomerania in 1309 and the Polish–Teutonic War of 1326–1332, Polish nobility grew hostile to the order. Their rejection compounded with the enduring hostility of the Lithuanians, creating tension on the order's southern and eastern borders.

The Golden Horde's defeat of Vytautas in the 1399 Battle of the Vorskla River completely changed Lithuanian foreign politics. Before then, the Lithuanians focused on eastward expansion. Now they changed their objectives and again concentrated on Samogitia. Given the local discontent against the Teutonic Order, Vytautas considered resuming hostilities.

Although the papal bull of 1403 ordered concessions to the feudal lords of Lithuanian regions, the order was not charitable. In order-controlled territories, Lithuanian discontent grew due to the ecclesiastical tithes and the restrictive regime imposed by the merchants of the Teutonic State. When it imposed a new round of tributes on the populus, the threat of a popular uprising became concrete.

=== Battle of Grunwald and peace treaties (1410–1422) ===
Carefully timed letters of protest from the people of Samogitia reached the Roman Curia at the same time as those of numerous European courts and guilds of cities in eastern Europe. Fomented by Grand Duke Vytautas, the first Samogitian uprising seized the region from 1401 to 1404 and ceased when a peace treaty was signed that recognized the crusaders' authority over the region. In 1409, Vytautas argued for a second insurrection. With open support for rebellion in Teutonic Order territory, Grand Master Ulrich von Jungingen called for war. On August 6, 1409, von Jungingen's herald brought a formal challenge from the order to the king of Poland. This signaled the beginning of the Grossen Streythe (Great Quarrel), as the Teutonic Knights called the Polish–Lithuanian–Teutonic War.

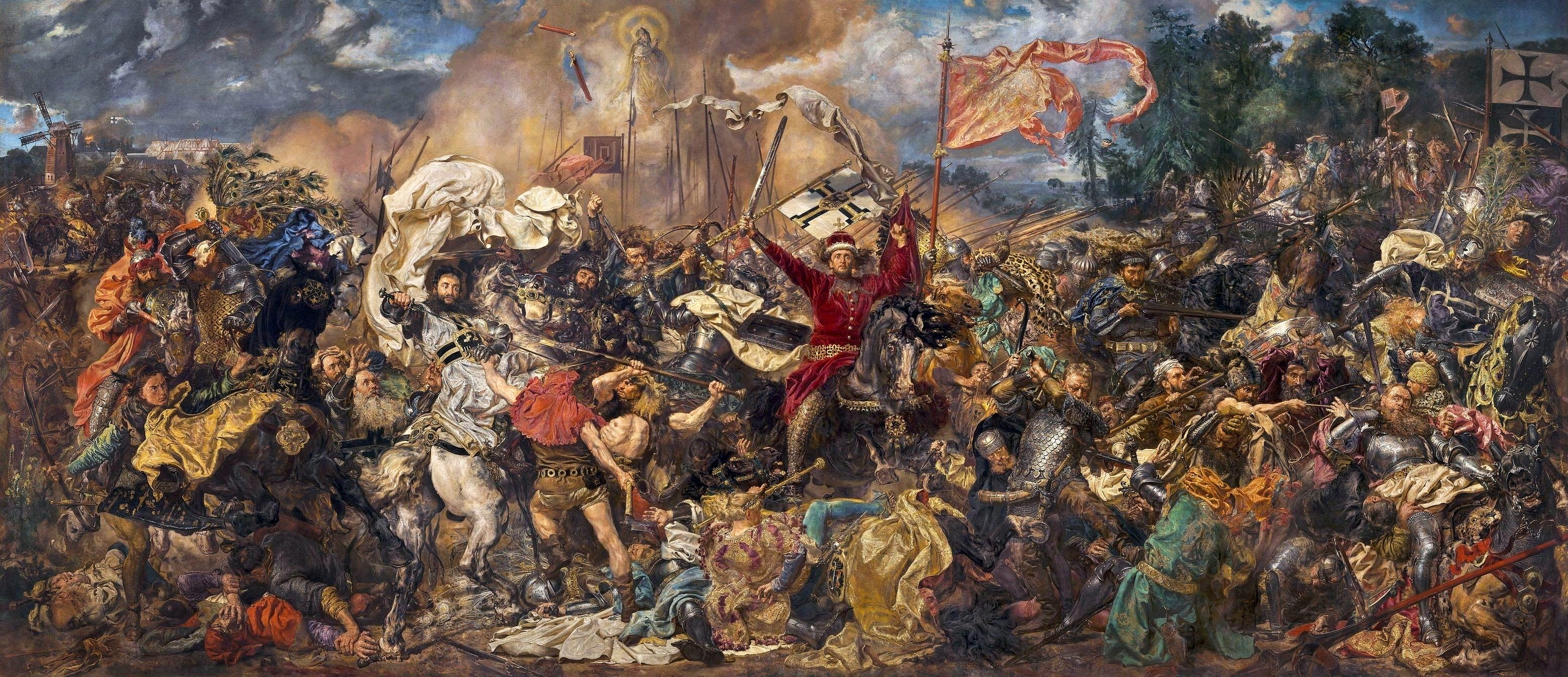
1410 Battle of Grunwald depicting Ulrich von Jungingen and Vytautas at center

The order began by invading Greater Poland and seizing many castles. In the fall of 1409, a brief armistice was negotiated with the mediation of Wenceslaus IV of Bohemia. On July 15, 1410, the combatants met in the historic Battle of Grunwald. The Teutonic Order was soundly defeated and entered a period of crisis. Despite his advantage after his victory, Polish king Jagiełło did not pursue a decisive, swift coup against the Teutonic Order, which gave the order time to defend their remaining positions.

With the Peace of Thorn of 1411, the Teutonic Order agreed to release Samogitia and make reparations for razed fortifications. The order stopped making incursions against the Lithuanians, who had by then mostly converted to Christianity due to Polish influence. But the order succeeded in negotiating for lighter sanctions overall thanks to the intervention of Sigismund of Luxembourg, the Holy Roman Emperor. Some authors consider the Peace of Thorn the conclusion of the Lithuanian crusades.

In 1413, the new Teutonic grand master, Heinrich von Plauen, opposed the arbitration of an imperial envoy, Benedikt Makrai, who had assigned the Neman's east riverbank to the Lithuanians. Because of his opposition, he was deposed by Michael Küchmeister von Sternberg. Understanding the fragility of the order at that moment, von Sternberg sought peace with Poland. However, when he also refuted Makrai's decision, the Polish invaded Varmia to begin the Hunger War of 1414. Defeated, the order renounced their claim. There was an extended period of truce-making and negotiations, which were extremely costly for a Teutonic Order already weakened by wars and reparations.

At the Council of Constance, the order had to justify its military actions. The situation became so financially precarious for the order that it had to cut military spending, a drastic shift compared to previous centuries. The Lithuanian borders were only stabilized after the brief Gollub War in 1422, with the Treaty of Melno. The demarcations of the treaty would remain unchanged for nearly 500 years and end with the Lithuanian occupation of the Klaipėda region in 1923.

== Military strategy ==
The Teutonic Order was eager to install itself in Samogitia, and the Lithuanians sought to dissuade them, but both failed. Not only did both lack long-term planning, but the Lithuanians also lacked support among the other feudal lords of eastern Europe. Only particularly energetic grand princes, such as Vytenis around 1311, succeeded in uniting the regionally fragmented Lithuanian forces under one banner for attack. Nevertheless, a combined army of regional sub-units remained only nominally united, which made a combined offensive action difficult in the event of a vigorous counterattack. The average number of men fielded by the order ranged from 3,000 to 8,000. Neither party planned campaigns for precise goals, except for the Teutonic campaign of 1336 that ended with the construction of Bayernburg. The Lithuanians tried to create a precise campaign in 1370, but this fell apart after their decisive defeat at Rudau.

The wars were marked by small skirmishes, raids, sieges, and ferocious reprisals aimed at slaughtering farmers. Both the Lithuanian light cavalry and the armies of the order preferred to raid unprotected settlements before engaging in large-scale battles. The Lithuanian raiders sometimes tortured their captives, and the Teutonic disdain for the Lithuanians was famously exemplified by their "gift" of the Grunwald Swords before their disastrous loss at the Battle of Grunwald. Major battles were the exceptions in the conflict. The Teutonic Order undertook around 300 military campaigns between 1305 and 1409. The Lithuanians made only 45 incursions into the Teutonic State.

== Historiography ==
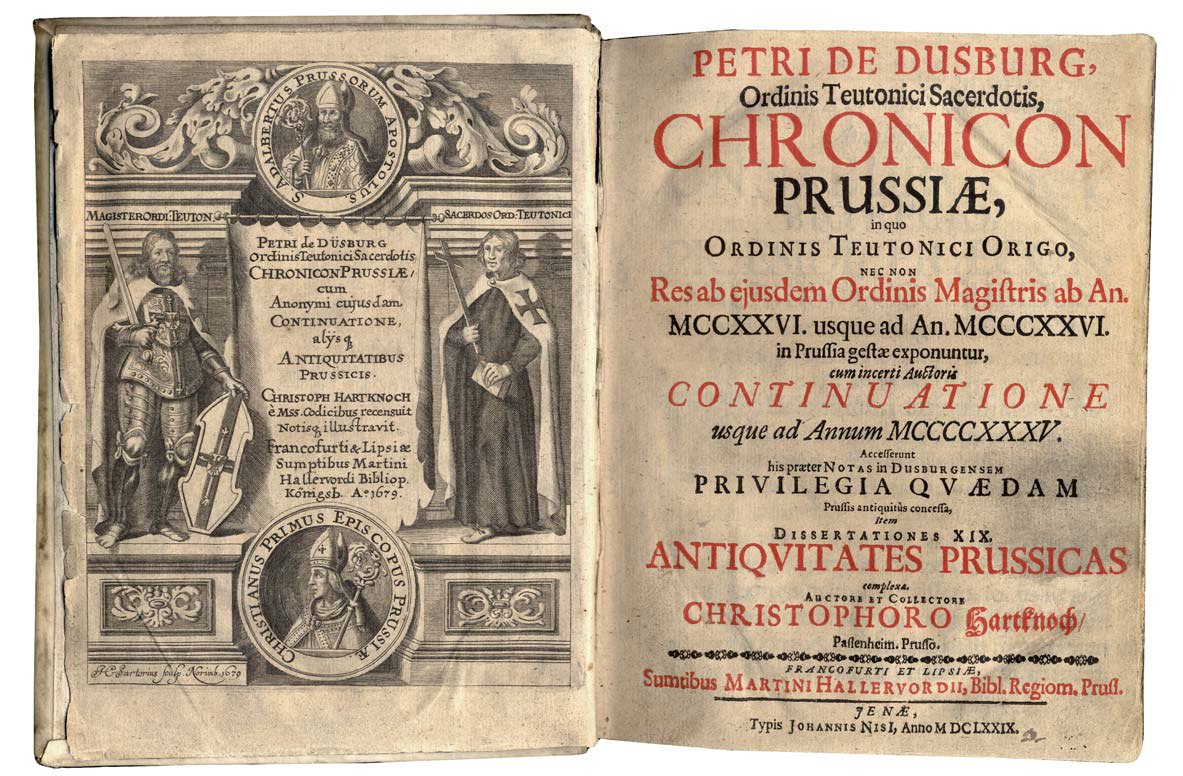
Title page and frontispiece of the Chronicon terrae Prussiae

The oldest historiography around the Lithuanian crusades is divided between German, Lithuanian, and Polish sources and is usually dedicated to recording political events. Primary source material is difficult to interpret because of biased descriptions each side used of the other to petition for foreign support. These propagandistic accounts are exemplified in Peter of Dusburg's 14th century writings like the Chronicon terrae Prussiae, which confused historical research on the crusades for centuries. For similar reasons, many coeval crusading accounts mistakenly refer to the Lithuanians as "Saracens". The order itself described the Lithuanians as "heathens", but French- or English-speaking crusaders often used the term even after the Lithuanians had mostly converted to Christianity. This probably contributed to the crusaders' confusion and served as a justification to continue crusades.

In Germany, the conflicts were largely forgotten or limited to the dispute between the Teutonic Order and the Kingdom of Poland that ended with the Peace of Thorn. Annalists like Wigand of Marburg often combined facts and oral recounts with folklore and myths. In the 18th century, Prussian scholars questioned the sincerity of Gediminas's diplomatic efforts and implied promises of conversion. In history books printed from the 1800s on, the Lithuanian crusade was minimized or recounted in single favorable episodes, such as the Battle of Rudau or the construction of settlements by German colonists.

The conflict is represented in the opposite way in Lithuania today. Through the Middle Ages, Lithuanian historians like Jan Długosz based their work on the Lithuanian Chronicles. The chronicles comprise combinations of documents (known as redactions) that reflect official state interpretations of Lithuanian history. The chronicles made arguments for Lithuanian nationalism by connecting the Lithuanian Palemonids dynasty to the rule of Ancient Rome. The historiographic record also includes the personal letters of the Lithuanian rulers Gediminas, Algirdas, and Vytautas, which were often written in Old Church Slavonic, German, or Greek. These political accounts are supplemented by cultural records like those of Michalo Lituanus and Simonas Daukantas. Samogitian writers have exalted local deeds of heroism because the region was the central Teutonic aim in the crusades. Poland, present throughout the conflict, is not often mentioned, although Stanisław Sarnicki's chronicle includes discussion of the crusades.

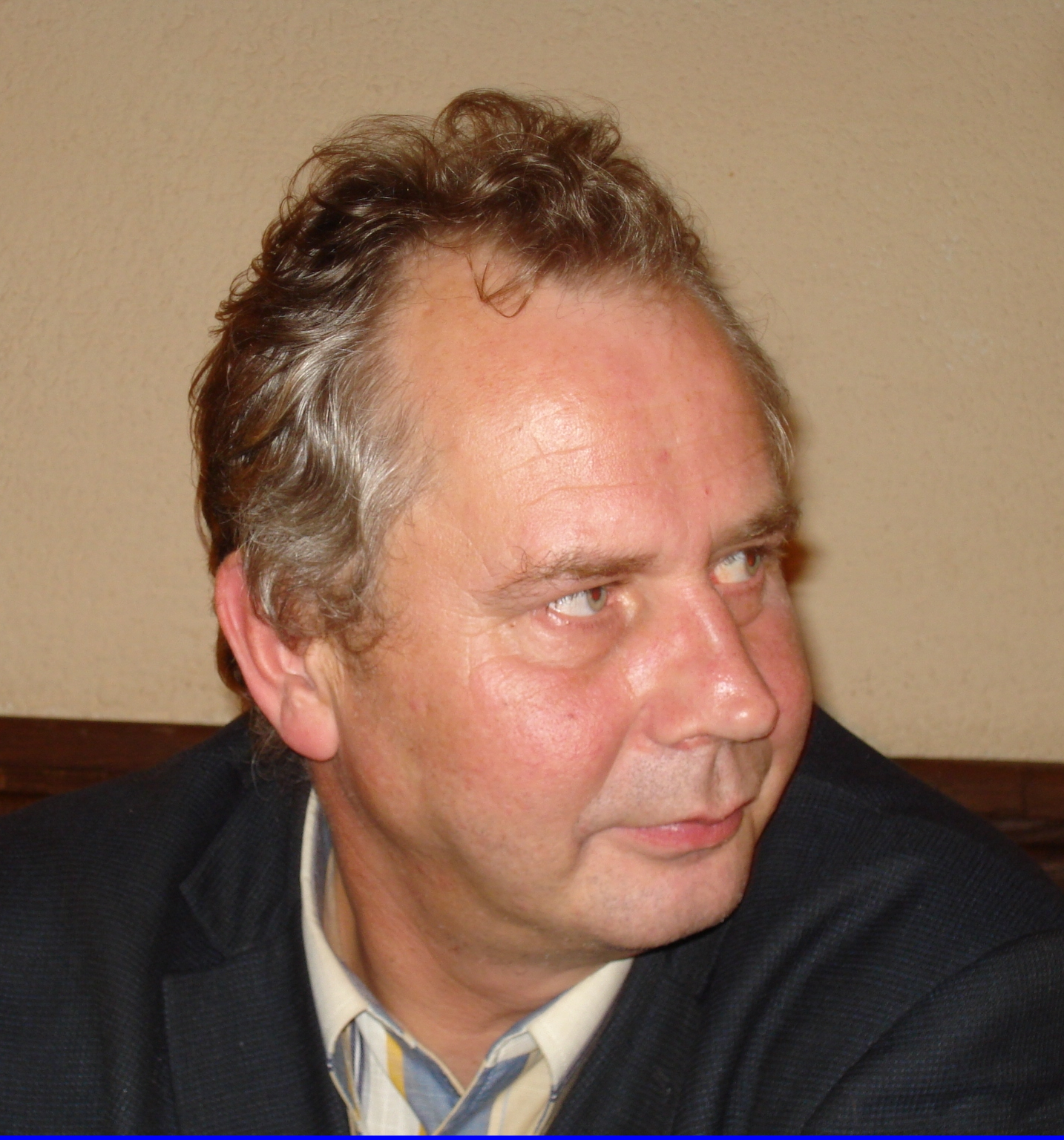
Lithuanian historian Alvydas Nikžentaitis

Modern Lithuanian historical research was heavily influenced by Soviet culture and strictures until only recently. A well-regarded Lithuanian study by Edvardas Gudavičius, "Kryžiaus karai Pabaltijyje", was written to avoid Soviet censorship, leading Gudavičius to downplay Lithuanian independence and overstate the role of medieval popes in directing the Lithuanian crusades. Similarly, Soviet historians often held that the Lithuanian coat of arms and governmental structure were all borrowed from Russian culture. Gudavičius later proposed that the shared rule of Algirdas and Kęstutis should be seen as part of a Lithuanian tradition of "submonarchs" with Algirdas leading, rather than the historical belief that the two brothers ruled as equals. Soviet researchers avoided writing about Algirdas. The 1986 theory of Gudavičius's student Alvydas Nikžentaitis, that Gediminas was poisoned, challenged the accepted Soviet view of Lithuanian history. Perception of Lithuanian military strategy has changed as well, as historians discovered that the Lithuanians did occasionally use cavalry and make intentional tactical retreats to confuse their enemies, as they did at the Battle of Grunwald.

Medievalist study of the Lithuanian crusades has been limited in English but increased with the fall of the Iron Curtain. The 1993 research of S. C. Rowell in Lithuania Ascending made it easy for other historians to examine the political and cultural context of the Lithuanian crusades. Rowell argues for the adoption of 16th century Russian sources which, though corrupted, contain information about the Lithuanian crusades. These newer sources see the uses of religious conversion by Lithuanian rulers like Gediminas as a strategy for gaining political clout and conducting diplomacy; they do not describe the conversions as deceitful.

== Timeline ==
=== Background ===
- 1230 — Seven Teutonic knights and their nearly 750 followers arrive at the mouth of the Vistula in the south of Chełmno Land under the command of Prussian Hermann Balk.
- 1236 — Battle of Saule on September 22, with a crushing defeat for the Livonian Brothers of the Sword
- 1237 — Assimilation of the indebted Livonian Brothers into the Teutonic Order
- 1242 — Defeat of a Teutonic contingent on Lake Peipus by Alexander Nevsky; the first Prussian uprisings after the attacks of Batu Khan in the region
- 1244 — Battle of Embūte
- 1251 — Lithuanian duke Mindaugas converts to Christianity, although he re-adopts Lithuanian beliefs around 1260.
- 1259 — Battle of Skuodas on August 5, with a victory by the Livonian Order under Burchard von Hornhausen
- 1260 — Battle of Durbe on July 13; second wave of Prussian uprisings
- 1270 — Battle of Karuse
- 1275–1299 — Irregular Lithuanian military campaigns, partly on behalf of the Archbishopric of Riga, in Semigallia
- 1279 — Battle of Aizkraukle on March 5, between the Livonian knights and the Samogitians, with victory going to the latter
- 1287 — Battle of Garoza
- 1298 — Battle of Turaida

=== The crusades ===
- 1303 — First Lithuanian incursions into Skalvia
- 1311 — Battle of Voplaukis
- 1315 — Siege of Christmemel
- 1320 — Battle of Medininkai
- 1323 — Battle of Memel
- 1324 — Alliance between Lithuanian duke Gediminas and the Polish king Władysław I Łokietek
- 1326 — Raid on Brandenburg
- 1329 — John of Bohemia joins the crusades against Lithuania.
- 1329 — Hill fortresses seized by the order and John of Bohemia after the Siege of Medvėgalis
- 1336 — Large campaign by the order that leads to the Siege of Pilėnai
- 1344 — The duumvirate between Algirdas and Kęstutis forms.
- 1348 — Battle of Strėva on February 2, with Lithuanian defeat
- 1361 — Kęstutis is captured by the order for the first time, but escapes the following year.
- 1362 — Siege of Kaunas, after which the castle is razed by the order
- 1365 — Siege of Kernavė
- 1370 — Battle of Rūdava on February 17, with victory for the order
- 1372 — End of the Lithuanian–Muscovite War
- 1377 — Death of Algirdas on May 24
- 1382 — Kęstutis dies, imprisoned, in August.
- 1384 — Siege of Marienwerder (Kaunas)
- 1386 — The son of Algirdas, Jogaila, accedes to the throne of Poland. His cousin Vytautas is proclaimed grand duke of Lithuania.
- 1387 — The Christianization of Lithuania begins, imposed by Jogaila.
- 1398 — Through the Treaty of Salynas on October 12, Vytautas transfers Samogitia to the order.
- 1399 — Battle of the Vorskla River was fought on August 12. The Lithuanians were weakened after their loss to the Golden Horde.
- 1390 — Siege of Vilnius
- 1401–1404 and 1409 — Samogitian uprisings
- 1402 — Siege of Vilnius

=== Aftermath ===
- 1410 — Battle of Grunwald on July 15, with a great Polish–Lithuanian victory over the order
- 1410 — Unsuccessful Polish–Lithuanian Siege of Marienburg from July 26 to September 19
- 1411 — The Peace of Thorn, in which the order renounced its conquered Lithuanian territories
- 1422 — The Treaty of Melno, in which the order renounced its claims on Samogitia forever

== See also ==
- Northern Crusades
- Prussian crusade
- Lithuania proper
- Baltic mythology
