= Bayernburg =

Wooden castles of the Teutonic Order in Lithuania

Bayernburg (German for "Bavarian Castle"; Lithuanian: Bajenburgas) is the name of three separate wooden castles of the Teutonic Order in different locations along the Neman River in the Grand Duchy of Lithuania during the Lithuanian Crusade. Their exact locations are not known and historians provide conflicting versions. The first fortress was built in 1337 by guest crusaders, including Henry XIV, Duke of Bavaria, in whose honor it was named after Bavaria. Emperor Louis IV declared it the capital of the to-be-conquered Lithuania. The newly built castle withstood a 22-day siege by Grand Duke Gediminas, but was abandoned by the Order in 1344. The Teutons burned down the first Bayernburg and built a brand new fortress a little closer to Prussia. The second Bayernburg withstood a six-day Lithuanian attack in 1381 but was burned down in July 1384 by Vytautas when he betrayed the Order at the conclusion of the Lithuanian Civil War (1381–84). The third Bayernburg was built in spring 1387 where Georgenburg stood but the new name did not gain acceptance and the fortress continued to be known as Georgenburg. This fortress was captured and burned down by Vytautas in April 1403 during the first Samogitian uprising.

== History ==
=== First Bayernburg (1337–44) ===
In spring 1337, many European knights, including Henry XIV, Duke of Bavaria, and nobles from Burgundy and Piedmont, arrived to Prussia for the crusade that was described by Wigand of Marburg. The Teutonic force sailed upstream the Neman River to an island near Veliuona. There they built two wards (identified as present-day Pilaitės) and another strong castle. This castle, named Bayernburg in Henry's honor, was manned by 40 brothers, 40 archers, and 100 soldiers. The contingent also included a number of Prussian natives, including Natangians and Sambians. Two of them decided to betray the fortress to Gediminas, Grand Duke of Lithuania. One of them stayed behind so he could secretly open the gates while the other reported to Gediminas that the fortress was built of logs and poorly reinforced with clay and should be an easy target. The conspiracy was discovered and the traitor was hanged.

Gediminas brought a large army and siege engines, including battering rams, and besieged Bayernburg on the Trinity Sunday (15 June 1337). The siege lasted for 22 days. It ended when an archer managed to shoot and kill Duke of Trakai. This note caused much confusion in historiography as Jan Długosz interpreted it to mean that it was Gediminas who was killed, but modern historians Edvardas Gudavičius and Alvydas Nikžentaitis argue that it was a son of Gediminas. After successfully withstanding the siege, Bayernburg was awarded weapons, food, flag and coat of arms by Duke Henry XIV. On 15 November 1337, Louis IV, Holy Roman Emperor, gifted to-be-conquered Lithuania to the Teutonic Order and named Bayernburg as the capital of the to-be-conquered land and future diocese. Duke Henry XIV, in turn, promised to build the cathedral. Since the pope decided diocesan affairs, the emperor reissued his privilege on 12 December emitting any references to the diocese.

=== Second Bayernburg (1344–84) ===
In 1344, after deliberations with his officers, Grand Master Ludolf König decided to abandon the first Bayernburg. The fortress was burned down and the second Bayernburg was built about one mile down the Neman River. The reasons for this relocation is not known. Perhaps the first fortress was too far into the Lithuanian frontier and was difficult to supply and maintain.

The second Bayernburg stood on the Lithuanian frontier for a few decades and was a base for further Teutonic raids into Lithuania. For example, in 1369, Teutonic soldiers took a supply of food for their campaign to reinforce Gotteswerder. Repeating this information German historian Caspar Schütz made an error by claiming that the fortress, known as Beyery, was controlled by Kęstutis. This confused note led some Lithuanian researchers to look for a Lithuanian fortress, known as Bairiai. Algirdas Makarevičius "found" it near the Nevėžis River north of Raudondvaris.

In 1381, Lithuanians commanded by Kaributas, brother of Grand Duke Jogaila, attacked Bayernburg when they learned that it was defended only by a handful of soldiers. The Teutons decided to defend the fortress. Seeing that they were unable to defend the outer bailey, they burned it down themselves. After six days, the Lithuanians retreated as Bayernburg was about to receive reinforcements from Ragnit. The fortress was captured and burned down in July 1384 by Vytautas when he reconciled with his cousin Jogaila at the conclusion of the Lithuanian Civil War (1381–84). Vytautas also burned down Georgenburg and New Marienburg.

=== Third Bayernburg (1387–1403) ===
The third Bayernburg was built in spring 1387 where Georgenburg stood. The new name did not gain popularity or acceptance and the fortress continued to be known as Georgenburg. This fortress was captured and burned down by Grand Duke Vytautas in April 1403 during the first Samogitian uprising. It was not rebuilt.

== Historiography and locations ==
Bayernburg is a poorly researched subject and is subject to many errors, inaccuracies, and wide-ranging interpretations in works by various historians. Not all historians recognize and distinguish that there were three separate fortresses with the same name.

Due to the supposed death of Gediminas during the attack on the first Bayernburg, debates over its location have received greater attention from historians. According to Johannes Voigt, the first Bayernburg stood on the Mastaičiai (Narkūnai) hillfort opposite of Skirsnemunė. In 1934, Kazys Paunksnis proposed that it stood in Pilaitės, located about 2 kilometres (1.2 mi) west of Veliuona. This opinion was accepted by Zenonas Ivinskis and supported by Adolfas Tautavičius who conducted archaeological excavations in Pilaitės in 1965 and found many crusader artifacts. While this became the leading theory, other opinions exist. Edvardas Gudavičius and Alvydas Nikžentaitis identified it with Marienburg, built on the Romainiai island between Veliuona and Pieštvė and destroyed in 1336. Gintautas Zabiela strongly refuted the idea that Bayernburg stood in Pilaitės as it is too small for a large fortress that could house 200 soldiers and withstand 22 days of attack. Zabiela instead suggested Plokščiai (Vaiguviškiai) hillfort (55°04′30.5″N 23°11′05.8″E). Later, Vytenis Almonaitis re-examined the arguments and concluded that the Plokščiai hypothesis is poorly substantiated, and the previous idea that Bayerburg should be localised at Veliuona must be ‘reinstated’.

A long historiographic tradition places the second Bayernburg at or near Raudonė, but it lacks proof as archaeological research dates Raudonė only to the 16th century. Chronicler Wigand of Marburg mentioned that the second Bayernburg was located about one mile west of the first, but a mile is an ill-defined measure of distance that varied greatly over the ages and medieval period is known for its inaccurate measurements. According to Zabiela, the nearest hillfort that could have housed the second Bayernburg is Maštaičiai (Narkūnai) hillfort located about 20 km or 12 mi from Plokščiai hillfort (55°04′43″N 22°54′44″E).

The location of the third Bayernburg is more clear. It is the present-day Kalnėnai hillfort near Jurbarkas. It is located on the right bank of the Neman River a little below the mouth of Mituva. It is a typical motte-and-bailey castle which was frequently used by the crusaders and not common among the Lithuanians.
