= Punia, Lithuania =

Punia
- Village
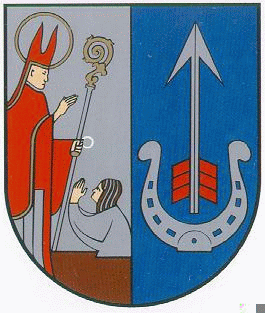
- Coat of arms

- Location of Punia
- Coordinates: 54°30′47″N 24°06′01″E
- Country: Lithuania
- Ethnographic region: Dzūkija
- County: Alytus County
- Municipality: Alytus district municipality
- Eldership: Punia eldership
- Capital of: Punia eldership
- First mentioned: 1382

Population (2001)
  - Total: 809
- Time zone: UTC+2 (EET)
  - Summer (DST): UTC+3 (EEST)

Punia (German: Ponau) is a historic village in the Alytus District Municipality, Lithuania. Situated on the right bank of the Nemunas River, it has a population of about 800. It was an important early city of the Grand Duchy of Lithuania.

== History ==
=== Grand Duchy of Lithuania ===
The town was first mentioned in 1382. The first church was built in 1425, likely by Vytautas the Great. Because of its good geographical location (Nemunas, direct route to Trakai), Punia became a local centre.

==== 16th century ====
In 1503, the town received Magdeburg rights and was promoted to city status.

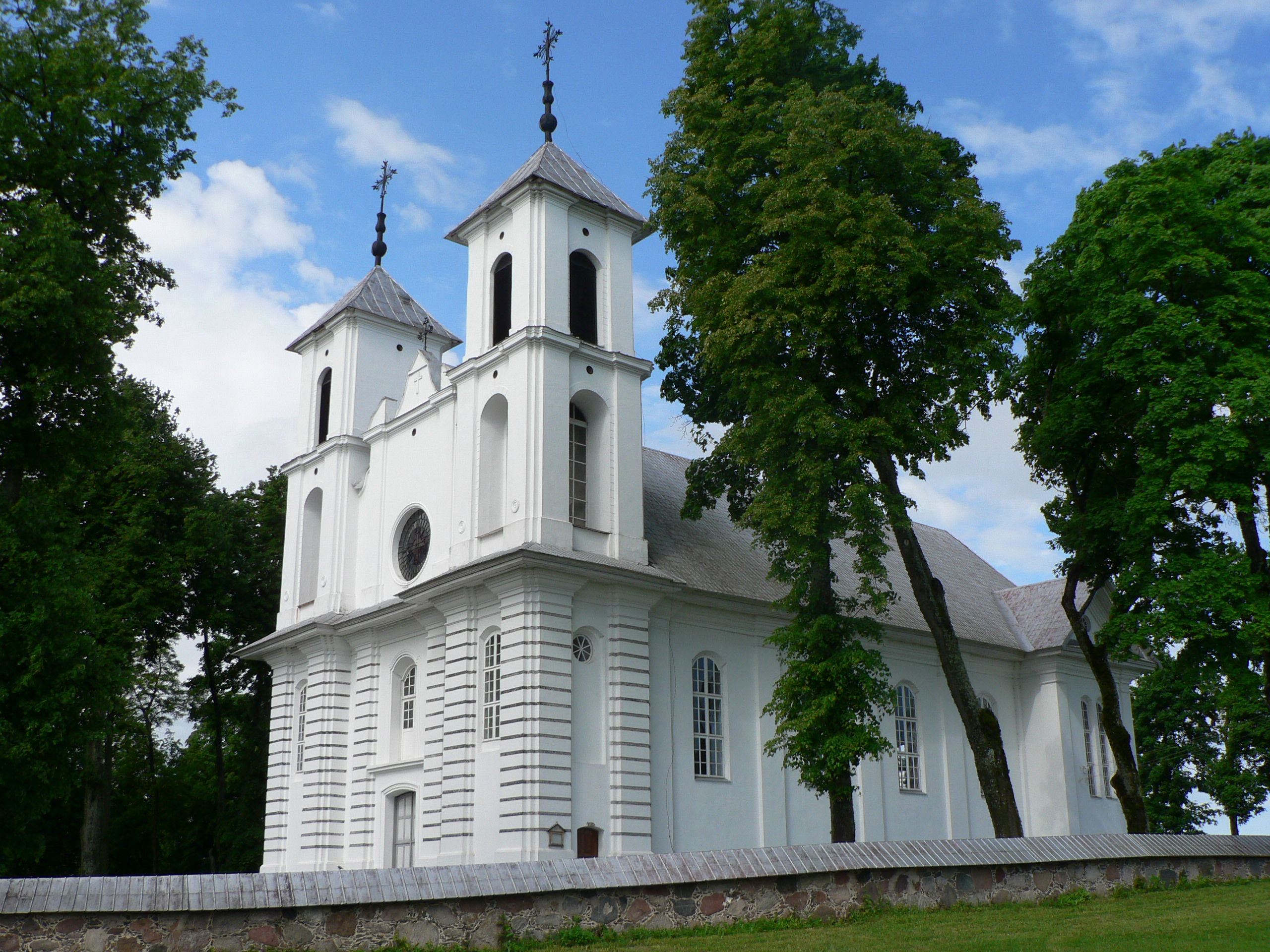
St. Jacob church (1857) in Punia

==== 17th century ====
The city reached its peak in the 17th century and became known for its pottery and smithery. The third church was built in 1688.

==== 18th century ====
At the beginning of the 18th century, Punia suffered a great deal of damage from the Great Northern War at the hands of the Swedish and did not recover until the end of the century. In 1785 a town hall was built.

=== 19th century ===
During the middle of the 19th century Jews settled in the town, developing trade and helping the town recover from two large fires. After the second fire, a new brick church replaced the old wooden church. By 1866 the number of residents almost doubled since 1833, reaching 1,000.

A Torah from Punia is now housed in the ark at Victory Park Shul in Randburg, South Africa.

=== 20th century ===
Punia suffered from another major fire, the World Wars, Soviet repressions and by 1939 it had only about 200 residents left. It recovered a bit only in the 1960s when it became the administrative centre of the local kolkhoz.

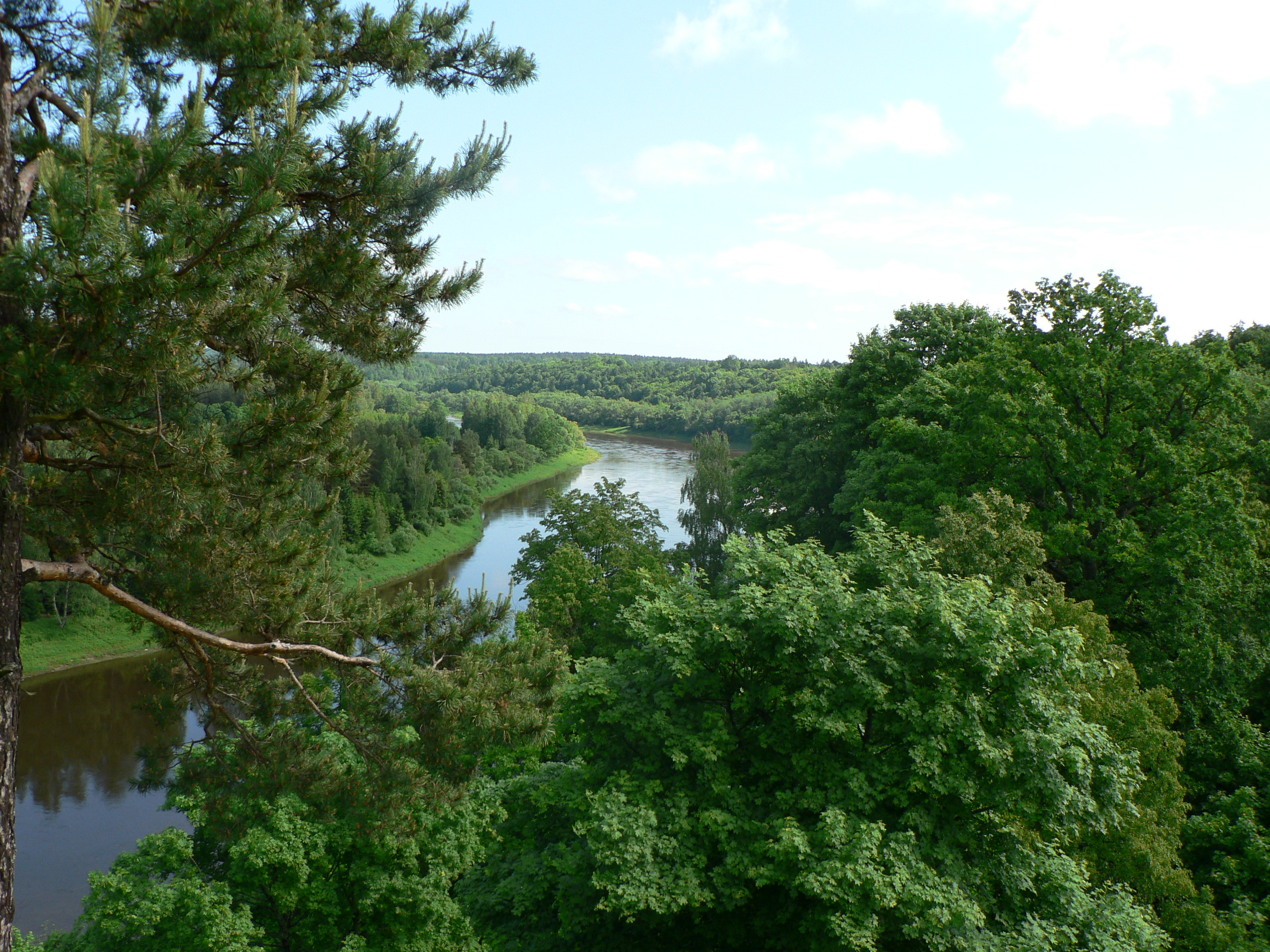
Nemunas seen from the Hill of Margiris

== Hill of Margiris ==
Punia is proud of the Hill of Margiris (Lithuanian: Margirio kalnas, 30 metres high), one of the largest hill forts in Lithuania, in the bend of the Nemunas River. It is believed to be the location of legendary Pilėnai which was destroyed in 1336 by the Teutonic Knights. The heroic defence of the castle is described by Władysław Syrokomla in his poetic novel "Margier". The castle was rebuilt in the 16th century only to be soon destroyed again.
