= Battle of Medininkai =

Coordinates: 55.74°N 22.37°E

- Part of the Lithuanian Crusade
Date	27 July 1320
Location	Near Medininkai (now Varniai)
Result	Samogitian victory

Belligerents
Grand Duchy of Lithuania	Teutonic Knights

Commanders and leaders
Unknown	Heinrich von Plötzke †

Strength
Unknown	40 knights Unknown number of soldiers

Casualties and losses
Unknown	29 knights and about 200 soldiers killed, vogt of Sambia Gerhard Rode taken as captive

The Battle of Medininkai took place on 27 July 1320 between the Teutonic Order and the Samogitian army near Medininkai (now Varniai).

== Battle ==
The Teutonic army, which consisted of 40 knights, crew of the Klaipėda Castle, and Sambians, was commanded by Marshal Heinrich von Plötzke. When the Teutonic army attacked Medininkai land, part of the crusaders spread out to loot. The Samogitians suddenly attacked their main forces. Von Plötzke, 29 knights, and many soldiers were killed, while Gerhard Rode, vogt of Sambia, was taken captive.

The battle stopped the Teutonic attacks on Medininkai land until Grand Duke of Lithuania Gediminas concluded a truce with the Teutonic Order (1324–1328).
