= Battle of Memel (1323) =

1323 battle of the Lithuanian Crusade

Coordinates: 55.706°N 21.128°E

- Part of the Lithuanian Crusade
Date	1323
Location	Memel (Klaipėda)
Result	Livonian victory

Belligerents
Livonian Order	Samogitia

The Battle of Memel was fought in 1323 between the Samogitians and the Livonian branch of the Teutonic Knights.

According to the chronicle of Peter of Dusburg, the Samogitians burned the city, but failed to take the Memel Castle. They also set fire to three neighboring castles, probably Žardė (now the southern outskirts of Klaipėda), Poyso (on the left bank of the upstream Dangė River, east of Klaipėda), and Eketė (at the confluence of the Dangė and Eketė Rivers).

After the battle, in 1328, the Livonian Order transferred the city and the surrounding area to the Prussian branch of the Teutonic Knights. In 1392, the Bishop of Courland also transferred his holding in Memel to the Teutonic Knights.
