= Raid on Brandenburg =

1236 Polish–Lithuanian raid

Date	February 10 – March 11, 1326
Location	Neumark (East Brandenburg)
Result	Polish-Lithuanian victory

Belligerents
Grand Duchy of Lithuania; Kingdom of Poland	Margraviate of Brandenburg

Commanders and leaders
David of Hrodna; Władysław I the Elbow-high	Louis V of Germany

Strength
1,200 Lithuanians	Unknown

Casualties and losses
Unknown	6,000 prisoners

The Raid on Brandenburg was a Polish–Lithuanian raid on the Margraviate of Brandenburg in February–March 1326. With papal approval and encouragement, King Władysław I of Poland allied with Gediminas of Lithuania and organized the raid against Louis V of Germany. Pope John XXII opposed Louis' ambitions to become the Holy Roman Emperor, King Władysław regarded Neumark (East Brandenburg) as Polish territory, while Lithuanians sought loot. The Teutonic Knights, under papal pressure, observed its peace treaties with Poland and Lithuania and did not interfere. The Polish–Lithuanian army raided Brandenburg for a month, reaching Frankfurt and Berlin, and took 6,000 prisoners.

== Background ==
After the death of Henry VII, Holy Roman Emperor, in August 1313, a war erupted between cousins Louis V of Germany and Frederick the Fair of Austria for the imperial crown. Ambitious Pope John XXII saw himself as the ultimate judge and arbiter in the conflict. When Louis V ignored papal decrees and assumed full imperial authority, the pope excommunicated Louis and rallied European nobility against him.

The Margraviate of Brandenburg was ruled by the House of Ascania, which became extinct with the deaths of Waldemar in 1319 and Henry II in 1320. The succession crisis caused a lot of confusion. Louis V considered the margraviate vacant and, after his victory in the Battle of Mühldorf, appointed his son also named Louis as Margrave of Brandenburg in 1323. That created a common border between possessions of Louis V and Polish King Władysław I, who competed for influence in the Duchy of Silesia. The Poles also regarded Lubusz Land, which was incorporated into Neumark (East Brandenburg), as their territory. Thus, it did not take much encouragement from Pope John XXII to convince King Władysław to attack Brandenburg.

In late 1324 or early 1325, Gediminas of Lithuania concluded a military alliance with Poland primarily directed against the Teutonic Knights, a crusading military order. The alliance was cemented by the marriage of Gediminas' daughter Aldona and Władysław's son Casimir. In 1322, Gediminas sent a letter to Pope John XXII with vague promises to convert to Christianity. Seeing a potential new ally, the Pope sent a delegation to Lithuania and by threat of excommunication compelled the Teutonic Knights, who supported Louis V of Germany, to make peace with Gediminas in August 1324. The peace remained in effect for four years until 1328.

== Raid ==
On February 7, 1326, with the help of papal legates, Władysław I concluded an armistice at Łęczyca with the Teutonic Knights and three Masovian dukes which guaranteed safe passage for the Lithuanian troops through Prussia and Masovia while they were in "Polish service". The truce was to last to Christmas 1326 and, according to chronicler Detmar von Lübeck, papal legates even accompanied the army to ensure the Knights observed the armistice. On February 10, 1326, David of Grodno led 1200 Lithuanian men to join the Polish forces. The joint army looted and robbed Frankfurt, Berlin, and surrounding territories. Thus, the pagans reached Central Europe and struck the Holy Roman Empire which shocked western rulers. Not meeting any organized resistance, they plundered churches and monasteries for about a month. Reportedly, they took 6,000 prisoners as slaves and much booty. The loot was large enough to allow Samogitian duke Margiris to pay 20,000 florins to King John of Bohemia when he raided Medvėgalis in 1329. German chronicles, including Nikolaus von Jeroschin, vividly described atrocities committed by the invaders. They were particularly scandalized by pagan Lithuanians who showed no respect for Christian symbols, establishments, or personnel. Reportedly distraught by Lithuanian cruelty, Masurian nobleman Andrew Gost ambushed and killed David of Hrodna (possibly – a son of Daumantas and their way back to Lithuania.

== Aftermath ==
While the raid was a successful military campaign and bought much loot, it was not a political success. The raid further antagonized Poland and the Teutonic Knights. The tension soon turned into the Polish–Teutonic War (1326–1332). Silesian Piasts turned against Poland and recognized suzerainty of King John of Bohemia. The alliance between the Pope and the pagan Lithuanians, subjects of the Lithuanian Crusade, scandalized western rulers and damaged the Pope's reputation. In 1328, Louis succeeded in installing Antipope Nicholas V. The Polish–Lithuanian alliance, which survived to 1331, ruined the Lithuanian alliance with the Duchy of Masovia, which oscillated between Poland, Lithuania, and the Teutonic Knights in attempt to maintain its independence. Gediminas' hopes of creating a Polish–Lithuanian–Hungarian alliance against the Teutonic–Bohemian alliance did not materialize. Instead, the raid encouraged John of Bohemia to join the Lithuanian Crusade and capture Medvėgalis in 1329.
