= Gerhard Rode =

Gerhard Rode (died 1320) – vogt or komtur of Sambia.

In July 1320, he took part in the attack on samogitian Medininkai. In the battle, he was captured into slavery. He was burned as a sacrifice to the gods with a horse attached to him.
