= Medvėgalis =

Hillfort in Lithuania

Coordinates: 55°37′44″N 22°23′19″E

Medvėgalis (Lithuanian pronunciation: [mʲɛd̪vʲeːgaːlʲis]) was a 14th-century fortress in Samogitia, located in present-day Šilalė District Municipality, Lithuania. Its remnants consist of two peaks: Medvėgalis Mound (Medvėgalio kalnas) and Medvėgalis hill fort ( Medvėgalio piliakalnis). It was first mentioned in 1316 in written texts and was one of the area's most important and strongest Lithuanian forts. It was attacked by the Teutonic Knights over 20 times throughout history, including the Siege of Medvėgalis in 1329, when it fell to the Teutonic forces and its defenders were converted to Catholicism.

The settlement at the hill fort complex lies to the southwest and northeast of the fort. It was renovated and adapted to tourists' needs in 2006 by the Varniai Regional Park and the Ministry of Environment. The fort was the subject of a poem by the poet Maironis.

The Medvėgalis Mound, elevation 234.6 m (770 ft), is the highest point in the Samogitian Upland.

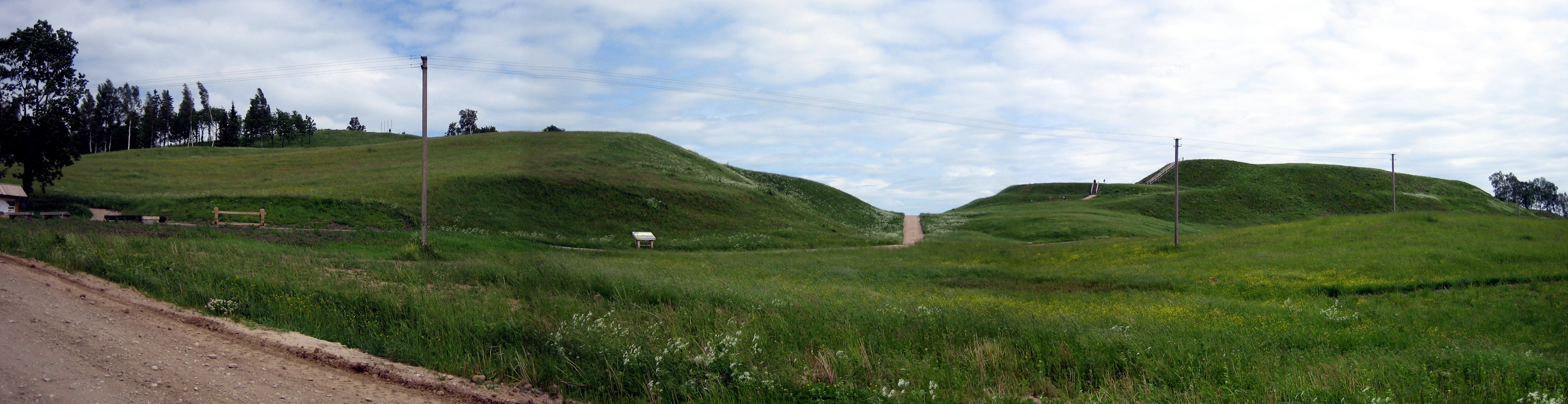
Medvėgalis Mound (left) and Medvėgalis Hillfort (right)

== See also ==
- List of hillforts in Lithuania
