= Caspar Schütz =

German historian

Caspar Schütz (c. 1540 – 16 September 1594) was a German historian.

Schütz was born in Eisleben. As professor of poetry at the University of Königsberg from 1562 to 1565, he developed interest in the history of Prussia. He then became the historian of the city of Danzig (Gdansk) and collected old writings and records. His main work, published in 1592 in Zerbst, was the Historia Rerum Prussicarum or "wahrhafte Beschreibung der Lande Preussen in 10 Büchern vom Anfange bis auf das Jahr 1525". He died in Danzig.

Later, others resumed the work he began, covering also later periods, like in the 1720s, Gottfried Lengnich.
