= Jean d'Outremeuse =

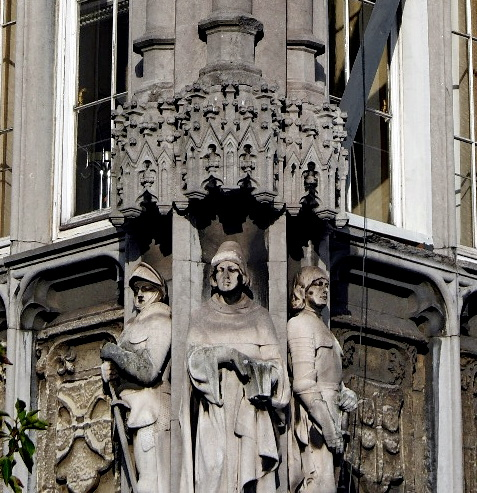
19th-century statue of Jean d'Outremeuse (centre) on the façade of the Palais Provincial in Liège

Jean d'Outremeuse or Jean des Preis (1338 in Liège – 1400) was a writer and historian who wrote two romanticised historical works and a lapidary.

La Geste de Liège is an account of the mythical history of his native city, Liège, written partly in prose and partly in verse. It was probably based on an existing text and consists of three books: book one, in 40,000 lines, book two, in 12,224 lines with prose summaries, book three, has been lost, but a few passages have been found.

Ly Myreur des Histors ("The Mirror of Histories") is a more ambitious narrative, purporting to be a history of the world from the flood up to the 14th century. It combines Vincent de Beauvais's early works Ogier le Danois and the Geste de Liège into a universal history, from the fall of Troy to 1340, mixing real and legendary events.

The Liège herald, Louis Abry (1643–1720), refers to the lost fourth book of the Myreur des Hystors of Johans des Preis, styled d'Oultremeuse. In this "Jean de Bourgogne, dit a la Barbe", is said to have revealed himself on his deathbed to d'Oultremeuse, whom he made his executor, and to have described himself in his will as "messire Jean de Mandeville, chevalier, comte de Montfort en Angleterre et seigneur de l'isle de Campdi et du château Pérouse". It is added that, having had the misfortune to kill an unnamed count in his own country, he engaged himself to travel through the three parts of the world, arrived at Liège in 1343, was a great naturalist, profound philosopher and astrologer, and had a remarkable knowledge of physics. And the identification is confirmed by the fact that in the now destroyed church of the Guillemins was a tombstone of Mandeville, with a Latin inscription stating that he was otherwise named "ad Barbam", was a professor of medicine, and died at Liège on November 17, 1372: this inscription is quoted as far back as 1462.

Tresorier de philosophie naturelle des pierres precieuses (a lapidary) is a compilation of recipes for making fake gems by coloring glasses by various means. It is of interest to glassworkers or historians seeking to understand the manufacture of ancient glass or fake gems adorning various pieces of goldsmith's work.

== Bibliography ==
Works

- 1864: Ly myreur des histors, chronique de Jean des Preis dit d'Outremeuse, éd. Ad. Borgnet, 6 vols. Bruxelles, Hayez pour l'Académie royale de Belgique, 1864-1880
- 1965: Jean d'Outremeuse, Ly myreur des histors. Fragment du second livre (années 794-826), éd. André Goosse, Bruxelles, Académie royale de Belgique, Classe des lettres et des sciences morales et politiques (Anciens auteurs belges, 6), 1965.

Studies

- Godefroid Kurth (1910) « Étude critique sur Jean d'Outremeuse », Bruxelles (Académie royale de Belgique)
- Fery-Hue, Françoise (1992) « Jean d'Outremeuse », Dictionnaire des lettres françaises: le Moyen Âge, éd. Geneviève Hasenohr et Michel Zink, Paris, Fayard, pp. 828–829.
- Fehse, Erich (1906) « Sprichwort und Sentenz bei Eustache Deschamps und Dichtern seiner Zeit », Romanische Forschungen; 19:2, 1906, p. 545-594.
- Cannella, Anne-Françoise (2002) Gemmes, verre coloré et fausses pierres précieuses au Moyen Age. Le quatrième livre du trésorier de philosophie naturelle des pierres précieuses de Jean d'Outremeuse, 2001-2002. (thesis, University of Liège)
