= Wigand of Marburg =

German herald

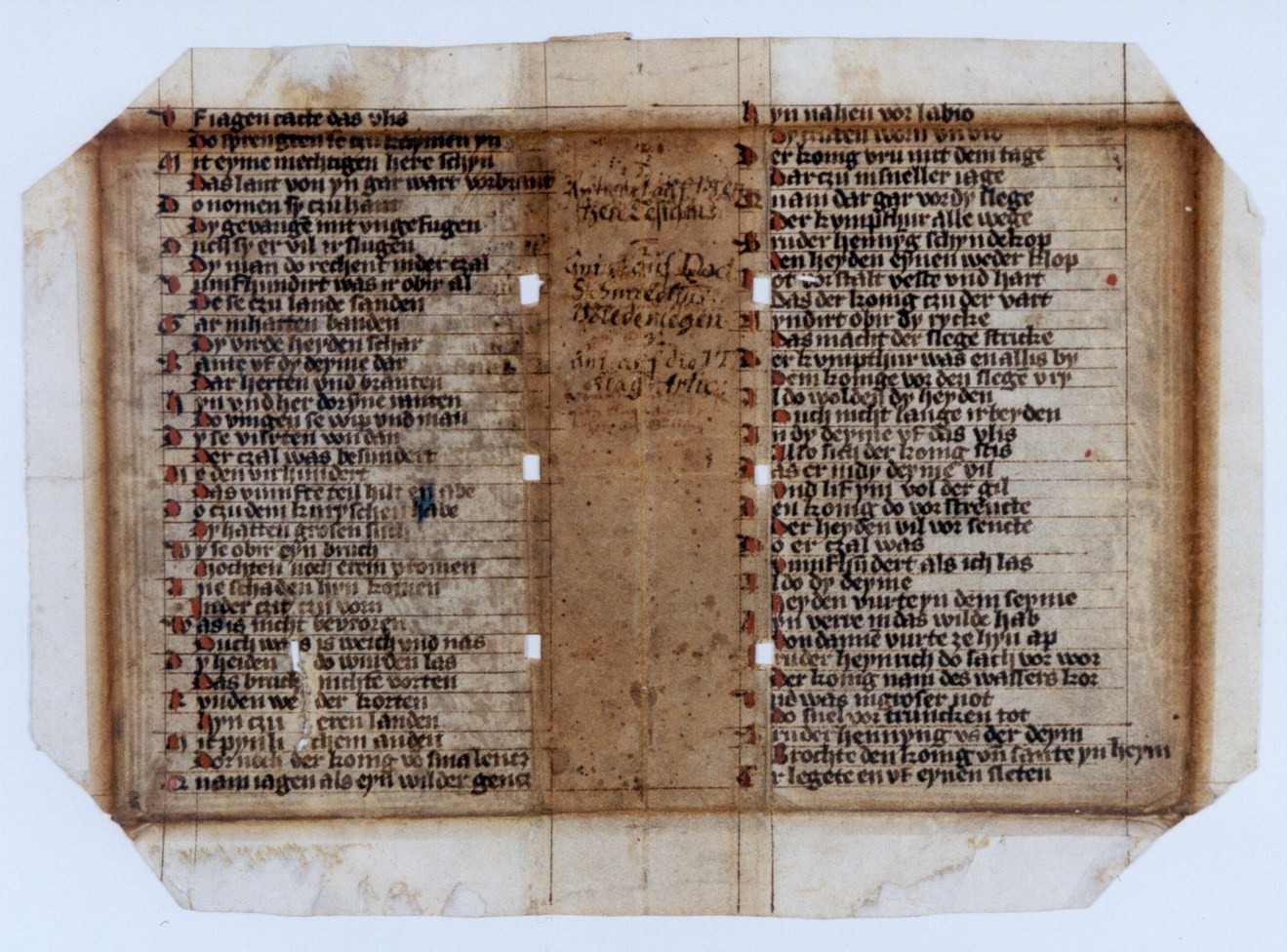
A fragment of Wigand of Marburg's chronicle containing lines 36-105 of fragment B (using Hirsch, et al.'s labeling)

Wigand of Marburg (German: Wigand von Marburg) was a German herald of the Teutonic Knights in Prussia and one of the notable chroniclers of the Middle Ages.

Wigand expanded upon the earlier work of Nikolaus von Jeroschin. His rhyming chronicle is one of the principal sources of information used for the history of the Prussian lands and parts of the adjoining Grand Duchy of Lithuania, covering the period between 1293 and 1394. Originally written in Middle High German rhymed prose, the work combined actual accounts with legends, folk tales, and myths. Out of an estimated length of 17,000 lines, only about 500 have survived to the present day. However, in 1464, the Polish chronicler Jan Długosz, speaking little German, asked Thorn clergyman Konrad Gesselen to translate Wigand's chronicle into Latin, and Gesselen's translation has survived almost intact. Gesselen titled his translation New Prussian Chronicle (Latin: Chronica nova Prutenica) to distinguish it from Jeroschin's earlier work, some of which he also translated. Gesselen did not take credit for his translation, but was identified as the author in 1895 by German historian Max Perlbach.

Wigand's chronicle is sometimes referred to in German sources as "Wigand of Marburg's rhyming chronicle" (German: Reimchronik Wigands von Marburg), since it is a medieval chronicle written in rhyming prose in a vernacular language (the definition of a rhyming chronicle). The chronicle is referred to in a few German sources as "[the] 'chronicle of Thorn'/'Thorn chronicle' from 1293 to 1394", probably because Gesselen's Latin translation was found in Thorn in 1821.
