= List of Lithuanian royal consorts =

The consort (or spouse) of the royal rulers of Lithuania and of the Polish–Lithuanian Commonwealth was in all cases a woman and nearly all took the title of Grand Duchess.

== Queen consort of Lithuania ==
Morta and her sister were the only Queens of Lithuania; their successors took the title of "Grand Duchess" instead.

The short-lived Kingdom of Lithuania of 1918 had a King-Elect Mindaugas II of Lithuania: but his first wife, Duchess Amalie in Bavaria, had died six years earlier, and his second marriage, to Princess Wiltrud of Bavaria, occurred six years after the Kingdom was replaced by a Republic.

== Grand Duchess of Lithuania ==
=== Mindaugas Dynasty ===
Picture	Name	Father	Birth	Marriage	Became Grand Duchess/Queen	Ceased to be Grand Duchess/Queen	Death	Spouse
	NN	-	-	Before 1251 (only a Grand Duchess)		Before 1251	Unknown	Mindaugas
-	Morta	-	-	c. 1251		17 July 1251 became Queen consort (Note: Mindaugas was recognized as the King on 17 July 1251; it's unknown if he married Morta before that date. If so, she was initially a Grand Duchess who ceased to be that and became Queen consort. If Mindaugas and Morta married after this date, she never bore a title of Grand Duchess and became Queen consort on a day of their wedding.); 1263 death	early to mid 1263	Mindaugas
-	Sister of Morta	-	-	early to mid 1263 (Queen)		12 September 1263 husband's death	-	Mindaugas
-	Ramunė	Mindaugas (Mindaugas)	-	1254/5	1267 husband's accession	1269 husband's death	-	Shvarn
-	Ludmila of Masovia?	Konrad I of Masovia (Piast)	1223	1238	1270 husband's accession	1282 husband's death	-	Traidenis

=== Gediminid Dynasty ===
Picture	Name	Father	Birth	Marriage	Became Grand Duchess	Ceased to be Grand Duchess	Death	Spouse
	Vida	Vidmund	It is uncertain how many wives Gediminas had. The Bychowiec Chronicle mentions three wives: Vida from Courland; Olga from Smolensk; and Jaunė from Polotsk, who was Eastern Orthodox and died in 1344 or 1345. Most modern historians and reference works say Gediminas' wife was Jaunė, dismissing Vida and Olga as fictitious, since no sources other than this chronicle mention the other two wives.					Gediminas
	Olga Vsevolodovna of Smolensk	Vsevolod of Smolensk (Rurikids?)	It is uncertain how many wives Gediminas had. The Bychowiec Chronicle mentions three wives: Vida from Courland; Olga from Smolensk; and Jaunė from Polotsk, who was Eastern Orthodox and died in 1344 or 1345. Most modern historians and reference works say Gediminas' wife was Jaunė, dismissing Vida and Olga as fictitious, since no sources other than this chronicle mention the other two wives.					Gediminas
	Jaunė (Ievna Ivanovna of Polotsk)	Ivan Vsevolodich, Prince of Polotsk (Rurikids?)	?	-		Winter of 1341 husband's death	1344/5	Gediminas
	Maria/Anna of Vitebsk	Yaroslav Vasilievich, Prince of Vitebsk (Rurikids?)	?	1318	1345 husband's accession	before 1349		Algirdas
	Uliana Alexandrovna of Tver	Aleksandr Mikhailovich of Tver (Rurikids)	1325	1350		May 1377 husband's death	Autumn of 1392	Algirdas
	Birutė	-	-	before 1349		3/15 August 1382 husband's death	Fall 1382	Kęstutis
	Jadwiga of Poland	Louis I of Hungary (Anjou-Hungary)	between 3 October 1373 and 18 February 1374	18 February 1386		17 July 1399		Jogaila
	Anna of Cilli	William, Count of Celje	1381	29 January 1402		21 May 1416		Jogaila
	Elizabeth of Pilica	Otto of Pilica	1370/1380	2 May 1417		12 May 1420		Jogaila
	Sophia of Halshany	Andrew of Halshany	1405	24 or 7 February 1422		1 June 1434 husband's death	21 September 1461	Jogaila
	Anna	probably a Lithuanian noble or a Rurikid	?	around 1370	1401 husband's accession	31 July 1418		Vytautas
	Uliana Olshansky	Ivan Olshansky (Olshanski)	?	9 November 1418		27 October 1430 husband's death	1448?	Vytautas
	Anna of Tver	Ivan Ivanovich of Tver; Rurikid	?	1430?	1430?	1 September 1432 power passed to Sigismund Kęstutaitis	Between 1471 and 1484	Švitrigaila
	Unknown	Unknown	-	January 1416	1 September 1432 husband's accession	Middle 1434		Sigismund Kęstutaitis
	Elisabeth of Austria	Albert II of Germany (Habsburg)	1435/36/possibly 1437	10 March 1454		7 June 1492 husband's death	30 August 1505	Casimir I
	Helena of Moscow	Ivan III of Russia (Rurikids)	19 May 1476	18 February 1495		19 August 1506 husband's death	20 January 1513	Alexander
	Barbara Zápolya	Stephen Zápolya (Zápolya)	1495	8 February 1512		2 October 1515		Sigismund I
	Bona Sforza	Gian Galeazzo Sforza (Sforza)	13 February 1495	18 April 1518 in Wawel Cathedral		1 April 1548 husband's death	7 November 1558	Sigismund I
	Elisabeth of Austria	Ferdinand I, Holy Roman Emperor (Habsburg)	9 July 1526	5 May 1543		15 June 1545		Sigismund II Augustus
	Barbara Radziwiłł	Jerzy Radziwiłł (Radziwiłł)	6 December 1520/1523	July/August 1547	17 April 1548	8 May 1551		Sigismund II Augustus
	Catherine of Austria	Ferdinand I, Holy Roman Emperor (Habsburg)	15 September 1533	23 June 1553		28 February 1572		Sigismund II Augustus

== Royal consort of the Polish–Lithuanian Commonwealth ==
Picture	Name	Father	Birth	Marriage	Became Grand Duchess	Ceased to be consort	Death	Spouse
	Anna of Austria	Charles II, Archduke of Austria (Habsburg)	16 August 1573	31 May 1592		10 February 1598		Sigismund III
	Constance of Austria	Charles II, Archduke of Austria (Habsburg)	24 December 1588	11 December 1605		10 July 1631		Sigismund III
	Cecilia Renata of Austria	Ferdinand II, Holy Roman Emperor (Habsburg)	16 July 1611	13 September 1637		24 March 1644		Władysław IV
	Ludwika Maria Gonzaga	Charles I of Gonzaga, Duke of Mantua (Gonzaga)	18 August 1611	5 November 1645	15 July 1646	20 May 1648 husband's death	10 May 1667	Władysław IV
	Ludwika Maria Gonzaga	Charles I of Gonzaga, Duke of Mantua (Gonzaga)	18 August 1611	30 May 1649		10 May 1667		John II
	Eleonora Maria Josefa of Austria	Ferdinand III, Holy Roman Emperor (Habsburg)	31 May 1653	27 February 1670		10 November 1673 husband's death	17 December 1697	Michael
	Marie Casimire Louise de la Grange d'Arquien	Henri Albert de La Grange d'Arquien (La Grange)	28 June 1641	5 July 1665	19 May 1674 husband's election	17 June 1696 husband's death	1 January 1716	John III
	Christiane Eberhardine of Brandenburg-Bayreuth	Christian Ernst, Margrave of Brandenburg-Bayreuth (Hohenzollern)	19 December 1671	20 January 1693	15 September 1697 husband's coronation	1 September 1706 husband's abdication	4 September 1727	Augustus II, 1st reign
	Catherine Opalińska	Jan Karol Opaliński (Opaliński)	13 October 1680	10 May 1698	12 July 1704 husband's election	1709 husband's desposation	19 March 1747	Stanisław I, 1st reign
	Christiane Eberhardine of Brandenburg-Bayreuth	Christian Ernst, Margrave of Brandenburg-Bayreuth (Hohenzollern)	19 December 1671	20 January 1693	1709 husband's restoration	4 September 1727		Augustus II, 2nd reign
	Catherine Opalińska	Jan Karol Opaliński (Opaliński)	13 October 1680	10 May 1698	1733 husband's restoration	1736 husband's abdication	19 March 1747	Stanisław I, 2nd reign
	Maria Josepha of Austria	Joseph I, Holy Roman Emperor (Habsburg)	8 December 1699	20 August 1719	1734 husband's election	17 November 1757		Augustus III
	Elżbieta Szydłowska	Teodor Szydłowski	1748	1785 (allegedly)	Did not (morganatic marriage)	25 November 1795 husband's abdication	1 June 1810	Stanisław II August Poniatowski (disputed)
