= Morta of Lithuania =

Morta

Queen consort of Lithuania
- Tenure: 17 July 1251 (Note: Baranauskas, Tomas (23 March 2002). "Mindaugo karūnavimo ir Lietuvos karalystės problemos". Voruta (54). Archived from the original on 26 October 2005. "(...) Mindaugas' coronation was a consequence of the establishment of the Kingdom of Lithuania, not a cause. The Kingdom of Lithuania had been officially legalized (...) on July 17, 1251 by a bull of Pope Innocent IV. It was then that the Pope gave permission and an order to crown Mindaugas the King of Lithuania. This was the true international recognition of the Kingdom of Lithuania.")–1263
- Coronation: 1253
- Died: 1263
- Spouse: Vismantas; Mindaugas
- Issue Detail: Rūklys and Rupeikis; Replys and Gerstukas
- House: Mindaugas
- Religion: Roman Catholicism; Lithuanian polytheism (until 1251)

Morta (died in 1263) was the Grand Duchess and subsequently Queen consort of Lithuania upon the accession of her husband, Mindaugas, who was crowned as King of Lithuania in 1253. Very little is known about her life. Morta was probably Mindaugas' second wife as Vaišvilkas, the eldest son of Mindaugas, was already a mature man active in international politics when Morta's sons were still young and dependent on the parents. After her death, Mindaugas married her sister, the wife of Daumantas. In revenge, Daumantas allied with Treniota and assassinated Mindaugas and two of Morta's sons in 1263.

== Origin ==
Her pagan name is unknown. The only clue into her origin or birthplace is a short mention in the comments following the treaty signed in 1219 between the Lithuanian dukes and Galicia–Volhynia. It says that Mindaugas killed many members of the Bulaičiai family, including Vismantas, whose wife Mindaugas took for himself. The Hypatian Codex elaborates that Vismantas was killed in 1251–1253 during an attack against Vykintas' castle (often assumed to be in Tverai). It is generally assumed that Morta was Vismantas' wife. Lithuanian historian Edvardas Gudavičius analyzed toponyms and determined that the Bulaičiai family most likely hailed from the Šiauliai region. Based on this extrapolation, residents of Šiauliai call the city home of Morta.

In the 16th-century Preussische Chronik, it is mentioned that Morta was actually from Sweden since at the time it was a common practice for pagan rulers who were seeking the throne to marry Christian brides from foreign countries. However, historians consider this claim to be untrue, suggesting that German chroniclers only thought so because they could not believe that a Lithuanian pagan could be such a fierce defender of Western Christianity.

== Life ==
Morta's life is briefly described in the Livonian Rhymed Chronicle. The Chronicle paints an image of a capable woman who advised her husband in political affairs and even provides several colorful dialogues between her and Mindaugas. According to the Chronicle, she supported Lithuanian conversion to Christianity, opposed Treniota, and defended the Christians when Mindaugas relapsed to his pagan faith. Taking into account her support to the Christians and the fact that her pagan name is unknown, Rimvydas Petrauskas proposed that perhaps Morta was baptized earlier than Mindaugas (he was baptized c. 1252 by the Bishop of Chełmno).

== Family ==
The written sources contain little information on Morta's family and it is not entirely clear how many children she had. Two sons, Replys and Gerstukas, are mentioned once in an act dated August 7, 1261. The act, by which Mindaugas granted all of Selonia to the Livonian Order, could be a medieval forgery by the Order. According to the Hypatian Codex, two sons, Rūklys and Rupeikis, were assassinated together with Mindaugas in 1263. This is the only information available and historians disagree on whether these were the same two sons, whose names were distorted by medieval scribes, or whether there were four sons.
