= Palemonids =

Legendary Lithuanian dynasty

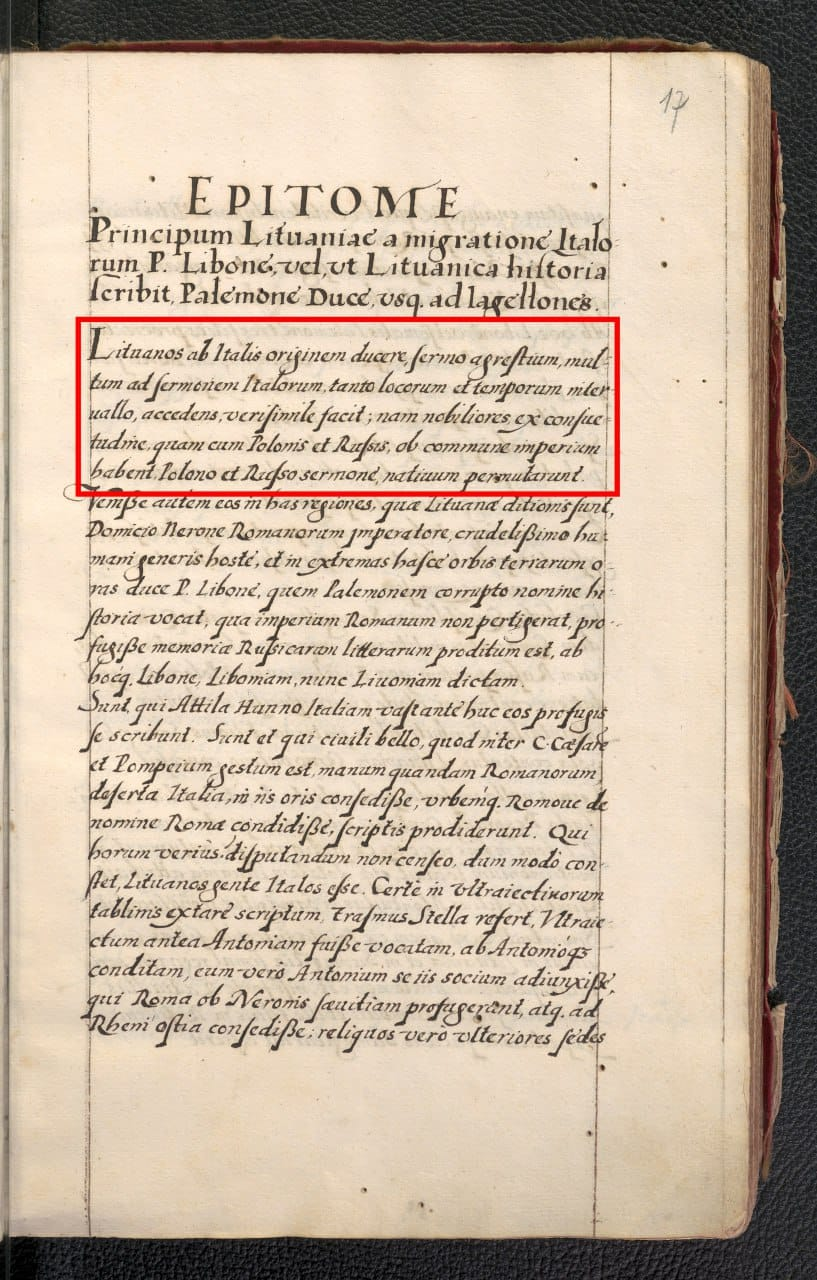
Epitome of the Second Statute of Lithuania in Latin (1576), claiming that the Lithuanians are of Italian origin

The Palemonids (Lithuanian: Palemono dinastija) were a legendary dynasty of the Grand Duchy of Lithuania. The legend was born in the 15th or 16th century as proof that Lithuanians and the Grand Duchy were of Roman origins.

== History ==
Jan Długosz (1415–1480) wrote that the Lithuanians were of Roman origin, but did not provide any proof. The legend is first recorded in the second edition of the Lithuanian Chronicles produced in the 1530s. At the time the Grand Duchy of Lithuania was quarrelling with the Kingdom of Poland, rejecting the claims that Poland had civilized the pagan and barbaric Lithuania. The Lithuanian nobility felt a need for the ruling dynasty to show upstanding origins, as the only available chronicles at the time were written by the Teutonic Knights, a long-standing enemy, and depicted Gediminas, ancestor of the Gediminids dynasty, as a hostler of Vytenis.

In this new Lithuanian chronicle, Palemon (sometimes identified as Polemon II of Pontus), a relative of Roman emperor Nero, escaped Rome together with 500 noble families. The company traveled north, through the Baltic Sea, and reached the Nemunas Delta. After that they decided to sail upstream until they reached the mouth of Dubysa. There, the Palemonids settled on a large hill (now known as the Palemon Hill) and ruled the country for generations until the Gediminids emerged. The chronicle skipped Mindaugas and Traidenis, attested Grand Dukes of Lithuania, entirely. It incorporated the account of the Gediminid line from the first edition. To make the story more believable, the chronicler presented a very detailed account of the journey. Because there were not enough generations to cover the gap between the 1st century when Palemon arrived and the 14th century when Gediminas died, the third edition of the chronicle, also known as the Bychowiec Chronicle, placed Palemon in the 5th century instead of the 1st, when Rome was devastated by Attila the Hun, and included Mindaugas and other attested dukes. But it was not enough and historians like Maciej Stryjkowski and Kazimierz Kojałowicz-Wijuk moved the account further, into the 10th century. Multiple contradictory versions of the legend survive to this day as historians tried to patch up some obvious mistakes and make it more historically sound.

The first to critically evaluate and reject the legend was historian Joachim Lelewel in 1839. At the end of the 19th century there were some attempts, for example in a history written by Maironis, to tie the legend with the expansion of the Vikings. While many historians up until the dawn of the 20th century believed the legend to be true, it is now largely discarded as a fictional story that only serves to illustrate political ideology in the 16th-century Lithuania.

A neighborhood in Kaunas is named after Palemonids – Palemonas.

== Genealogical tree according to the second edition of the Lithuanian Chronicles ==
Palemon
Polemon II of Pontus, or in alternative versions hailing from the Colonna family or from Republic of Venice

Borkus
Duke of Samogitia
Founder of Jurbarkas

Kunos
Duke of Aukštaitija
Founder of Kaunas

Spera
Duke of Eastern Lithuania
Name: Lake Spėra

Daumantas
Duke of Deltuva
From Centaurus family

Kernius
Duke of Lithuania
Founder of Kernavė

Gimbutas
Duke of Samogitia

Montvilas
Duke of Samogitia

Kiras
Duke of Deltuva

Pajauta ♀
Name: valley in Kernavė

Nemunas
Name: Nemunas

Erdvilas
Duke of Naugardukas

Skirmantas

Vykintas
Duke of Samogitia

Mingaila
Duke of Naugardukas and Polockas

Živinbudas
Duke of Samogitia

Kukovaitis
Duke of Lithuania

Skirmantas
Duke of Naugardukas, Pinsk, Turov, etc.

Ginvilas
Duke of Polockas

Kukovaitis
Duke of Samogitia

Traidenis
Grand Duke of Naugardukas

Liubartas
Grand Duke of Karachev

Pisimantas
Duke of Turov

Rogvolodas
Duke of Polockas

Algimantas
Duke of Naugardukas

Gleb
Duke of Polockas

Paraskeva ♀

Utenis
Duke of Lithuania and Samogitia
Founder of Utena

Ryngold
Duke of Naugardukas

Vaišvilkas
Duke of Naugardukas

Šventaragis
Grand Duke of Lithuania
Name: valley in Vilnius

Skirmantas
Grand Duke of Lithuania

Trabus
Duke of Samogitia

Koliginas
Duke of Lithuania and Rus'

Romanas
Grand Duke of Lithuania

Narimantas
Grand Duke of Lithuania

Daumantas

Olshan
Ancestor of Alšėniškiai

Giedrius
Ancestor of Giedraitis family

Traidenis
Grand Duke of Lithuania

Rimantas
Grand Duke of Lithuania

Source: Jučas, Mečislovas (2003). Lietuvos metraščiai ir kronikos (in Lithuanian). Vilnius: Aidai. p. 53. ISBN 9955-445-40-8. The table was prepared according to the second edition of the Lithuanian Chronicles, the so-called transcription of the Archaeological Society. Other editions, transcriptions, chronicles, and later historians presented significantly different genealogical trees.

Note: Darker shaded cells represent dukes who share their names with real historical figures. Dukes with the title Grand Duke of Lithuania ruled the unified country: i.e. they ruled Lithuania, Samogitia, and Rus'.

== See also ==
- Family of Gediminas
- Gediminids
