= House of Mindaugas =

First royal family of Lithuania

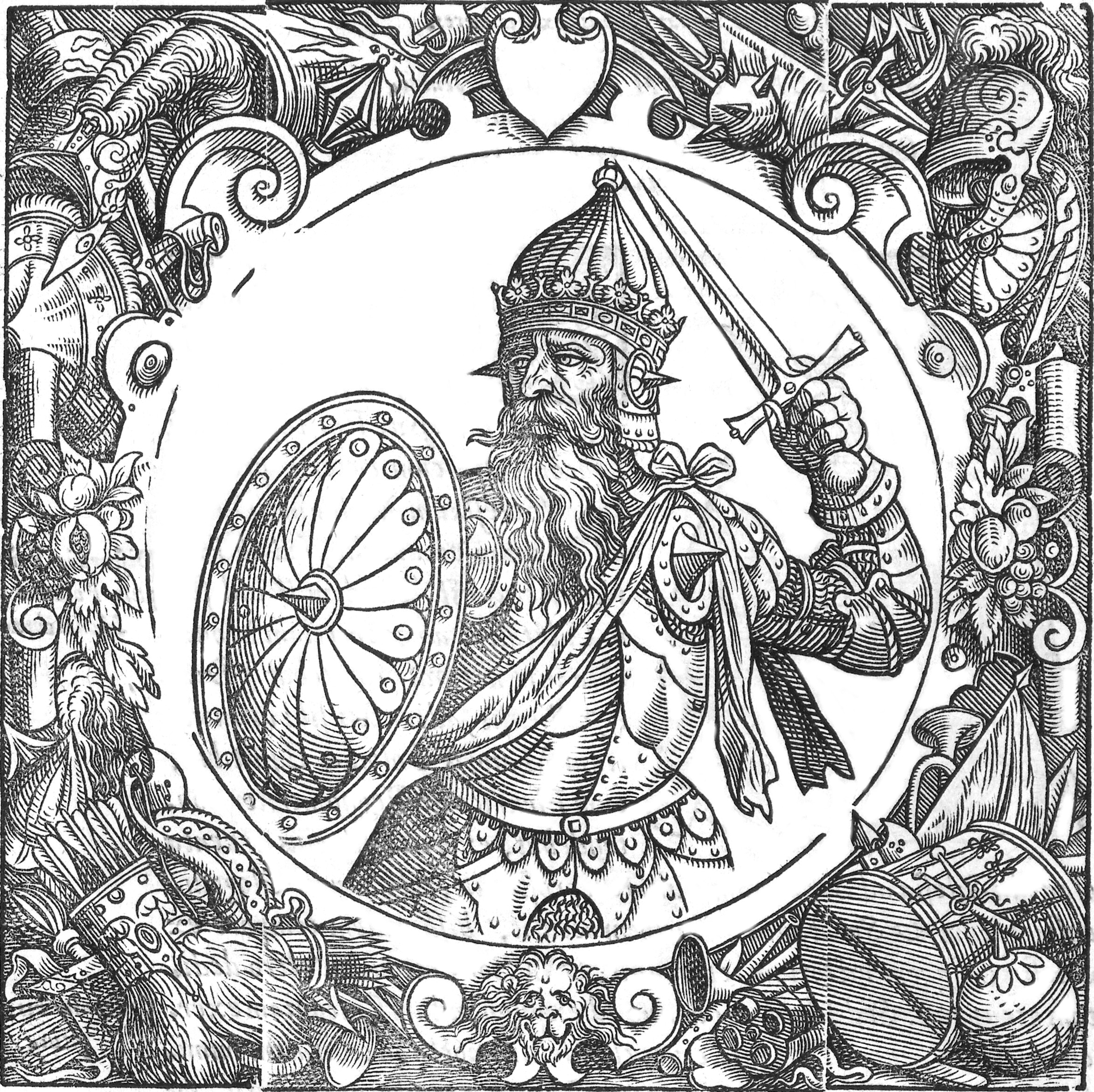
Depiction of King Mindaugas

The House of Mindaugas (Lithuanian: Mindaugaičiai) was the first royal family of Grand Duchy of Lithuania, centered on Mindaugas, the first known and undoubted sovereign of Lithuania. He was crowned as King of Lithuania in 1253 and assassinated ten years later. His known family relations end with children; there is no data on his great-grandchildren or any relations with the Gediminids, a dynasty of sovereigns of Lithuania and Poland that started with Butigeidis ca. 1285 and ended with Sigismund II Augustus in 1572.

Historians have to make considerable assumptions trying to reconstruct the full family tree because of extremely scarce written sources about the early history of Lithuania. The matter is further complicated by the 16–17th century genealogies, most famously the Bychowiec Chronicle, that mixed legends and facts into one. The legends about Palemonids, a noble family from the Roman Empire who settled in Lithuania and gave rise to the Duchy, are quite popular and widespread in these genealogies. The real historical data comes from the Old East Slavic and Livonian chronicles, most important of these being the Hypatian Codex.

== Family tree ==
Mindaugas and his brother Dausprungas are first mentioned among the 5 elder dukes in a 1219 treaty with Galicia–Volhynia. Since at that time both brothers had to be relatively young, it implies that they inherited their high status. However, no written sources of the period talk about their father, except the Livonian Rhymed Chronicle, which mentions in passing that he was a powerful Grand Duke (ein kunic grôß). Chronicles written in the 16–17th centuries gave him the name of Ryngold (Lithuanian: Rimgaudas) and made him part of the Palemonids' legends. Historian Edvardas Gudavičius argued that because the 1219 treaty mentioned two pairs of young brothers among the 5 elder dukes (Mindaugas and Dausprungas, Daujotas and Vilikaila), it was very likely that they were sons of powerful Lithuanian dukes Daugirutis and Stekšys, killed in 1213 and 1214.

Dausprungas is not mentioned anywhere else. However, it is known that Mindaugas had two nephews, Tautvilas and Gedvydas, who waged a war against their uncle. Since historians do not have any data on other brothers of Mindaugas, it is generally assumed that the two were sons of Dausprungas. During the civil war of 1249–1252 Tautvilas and Gedvydas asked Daniel of Galicia, their brother-in-law, for help. This bit of information indicates that they also had a sister. The sister was the second wife of Daniel and they did not have children. Dausprugas' wife must have been Duke of Samogitia Vykintas' sister since Vykintas was an uncle of Tautvilas and Gedvydas. It is believed that Gedvydas died in 1253 in a campaign against Bohemia, as it is the last message about him. Tautvilas was killed by his cousin Treniota in 1263. Some historians suggest that Tautvilas had a son, Constantine, who ruled Vitebsk, however others disagree and claim that his son might have been Aigust, who was sent by Novgorod to Pskov in 1271.

It is assumed that Mindaugas had three wives even though nothing is known about the first one. The assumption is made because Mindaugas had two older children, Vaišvilkas and a daughter of unknown name, who already led independent lives while the children Mindaugas had with Morta were young and still dependent on their father. Vaišvilkas became such a devoted Orthodox that he voluntarily gave up the title of Grand Duke of Lithuania in favor of his brother-in-law Shvarn and died heirless. The only known daughter of Mindaugas, by marriage with Shvarn in 1255, became the Queen of Galicia (1255–1264) and Princess of Chełm (1264). According to one source, after Shvarn's death his brother Lev of Galicia married the childless widow Ramona to his ally count Hujd. Their children were the originators of the Sas noble family of western Ukraine and Poland.

In the commentary of the 1219 treaty with Galicia–Volhynia it is noted that Mindaugas took the wife of Vismantas from the Bulionis family for himself. It is assumed that Vismantas' wife and Morta are the same woman. It is known that Vismantas died in 1252 in a battle against Mindaugas; however the date of Mindaugas and Morta's wedding is unknown. There is no consensus on how many children Morta had. The chronicles mention two sons, Replys and Gerstukas, in 1261. In 1263 two sons, Ruklys and Rupeikis, were assassinated together with Mindaugas. This is the only information available and historians disagree on whether these are the same two sons, whose name got distorted by scribes, or they are four sons. There is no data on any rivals to the crown after the assassination, except for Vaišvilkas and Tautvilas; it would indicate that, whether there were two or four sons, they had perished in their youth.

After Morta's death in 1262, Mindaugas took her sister (name unknown) as his wife despite her being married to Daumantas. This cruel act motivated Daumantas to become an ally of Treniota and assassinate Mindaugas with two of his sons. Treniota was Mindaugas' nephew. It is believed that he was son of Duke of Samogitia, either Vykintas or Erdvilas. If it really was Vykintas, then there was a double marriage: Vykintas' sister married Dausprungas and Dausprungas' (and Mindaugas') sister married Vykintas. Erdvilas is mentioned only once in the 1219 treaty. The other nephew, Lengvenis, played a role in Lithuanian state in 1242–1260.

== Graphic representation ==
Please note the assumptions outlined above

Ancestor
Mindaugas' father
Legendary Ryngold
Main source: Kiaupa, Zigmantas; Jūratė Kiaupienė; Albinas Kuncevičius (2000) [1995]. The History of Lithuania Before 1795 (English ed.). Vilnius: Lithuanian Institute of History. p. 67. ISBN 9986-810-13-2.

Children
Dausprungas
Only mention: 1219
Mindaugas
Grand Duke/King of Lithuania: 1236–1263
Daughter
Daughter

Children-in-law
Name unknown
Vykintas' sister
Name unknown (1st wife)
Morta (2nd wife)
Vismantas' wife; Died: ca. 1262
Name unknown (3rd wife)
Daumantas' wife, Morta's sister
Name unknown
Duke of Nalšia
Vykintas or Erdvilas
Duke of Samogitia

Grandchildren
Daughter
Married: Daniel, King of Galicia–Volhynia
Tautvilas
Died: 1263
Gedvydas
Died: ca. 1253
Vaišvilkas
Grand Duke of Lithuania: 1264–1267
Daughter
Married: Shvarn, King of Galicia
Replys
Only mention: 1261
Gerstukas
Only mention: 1261
Ruklys
Died: 1263
Rupeikis
Died: 1263
Lengvenis
Died: after 1260
Treniota
Grand Duke of Lithuania: 1263–1264

== See also ==
- Palemonids – legendary dynasty before Mindaugas
- Gediminids – dynasty that started ca. 1285
- History of Lithuania (1219–1295)
