= Erdvilas =

Duke of Lithuania in 1219

Erdvilas (Erdywił, Ердивил, Erdiwił, Erdwil) was one of the 21 early dukes of Lithuania who signed a treaty with Galicia–Volhynia in 1219. He and Vykintas are the two dukes of Samogitia mentioned in the treaty. This is supported by the fact that the eastern part of Samogitia supported Mindaugas, the king of Lithuania, while the western part, ruled by Vykintas, was more hostile. That is the only mention of him in written sources. Few historians consider that Treniota, Mindaugas' nephew, was son of Erdvilas. However more prefer Vykintas as Treniota's father.

== Account in the Bychowiec Chronicle ==
The Bychowiec Chronicle presents a legendary version of Erdvilas' life. He was a son of Samogitian duke Mantvila, who sent him to conquer Black Ruthenia. Erdvilas established his capital in Novogrudok, founded Grodno, and helped to rebuild other cities plundered by the Tatars. Refusing to pay tribute, Erdvilas gathered a large army, whose leader was Grumpis Gostautas, and defeated the Tatars on the banks of the Dnieper River. According to this account Vykintas was Erdvilas' brother and ruled Samogitia. When Vykintas died without leaving an heir, Erdvilas inherited Samogitia.

This account has no historical basis and is part of the Palemonids legend. Erdvilas would belong to the fifth generation of a noble family from the Roman Empire who settled in the Grand Duchy of Lithuania and gave rise to the state.

== See also ==
- List of early Lithuanian dukes
- House of Mindaugas

== Sources ==
- Ivinskis, Zenonas (1939). "Erdvilas". In Vaclovas Biržiška (ed.). Lietuviškoji enciklopedija (in Lithuanian). Vol. VII. Kaunas: Spaudos Fondas. pp. 994–995.
