= Rietavas Eldership =

Eldership of Lithuania

The Rietavas Eldership (Lithuanian: Rietavo seniūnija) is an eldership of Lithuania, located in the Rietavas Municipality. In 2021 its population was 2317.
