= Ringaudas =

Mythological Grand Duke of Lithuania

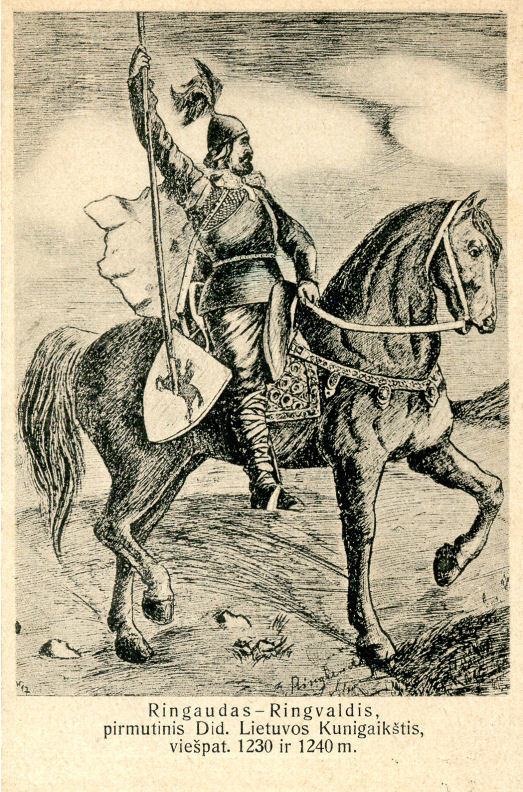
Ringaudas (Ryngold), The Grand Duke of Lithuania, postcard 1920.

Ringaudas or Ryngold was a mythological Grand Duke of Lithuania from the Palemonids legends and supposed father of Mindaugas, the first King of Lithuania (1251–1263). In fact, there is nothing known about Mindaugas' father from reliable sources. The Livonian Rhymed Chronicle, a contemporary source, just mentions that he was a powerful duke, but does not provide his name.

Ringaudas, son of otherwise unknown Algimantas, is first mentioned in the second redaction of the Lithuanian Chronicle written c. 1515 and has no historical basis. In the chronicle Ringaudas returned to Navahrudak after a victorious battle with the Mongols on the bank of the Neman River at Mohilna near Minsk. This battle could have some historical basis as Mongols did invade Lithuania, but it happened in the late 1230s and early 1240s. However, it is known for a fact that at the time Mindaugas already had supreme power in Lithuania. The legendary account claimed that Ringaudas fathered three sons. He left Navharudak to one of his sons, Vaišvilkas. However, it is known from reliable contemporary sources that Vaišvilkas was son of Mindaugas. Therefore the third redaction of the Lithuanian Chronicle, also known as the Bychowiec Chronicle, made Ringaudas father of Mindaugas to correct this clear contradiction. This legendary version was popularized by Maciej Stryjkowski and other medieval historians, and it still survives to this day.

Maciej Stryjkowski, asserts that Ringaudas father, Algimantas, ruled in Navahrudak over all Rus' and Lithuania, starting from Neris River up to Starodub, Chernihiv, Turau and Karachev, as well as all of Podlachia with its adjacent castles, Brest, Mielnik, Drohiczyn, etc., holding them in peaceful tenure. Algimantas hurriedly died after his father, Treniota, leaving all lands, including Rus' territories, to his son, Ringaudas, with common consent of all estates.

== See also ==
- Palemonids – the legendary dynasty of Ringaudas (Ryngold)
- House of Mindaugas – historical family tree of Mindaugas
- List of early Lithuanian dukes
