= Tautvilas =

Lithuanian prince (died 1263)

Tautvilas (or Tautvila; died 1263) was the Lithuanian prince of Polotsk and one of Dausprungas' sons and nephews of Lithuanian king Mindaugas. Tautvilas together with his brother Gedvydas and uncle Vykintas waged a civil war against Mindaugas. The war resulted in Mindaugas' coronation.

== Life ==
In 1248, Mindaugas sent Tautvilas, Edivydas, and Vykintas to conquer Smolensk promising that they could keep what they would conquer. They defeated Mikhail Khorobrit at the battle of the Protva River, but were defeated by the princes of Vladimir-Suzdal. After discovering about the failure, Mindaugas took their land and property for himself. At the beginning of 1249, Tautvilas, Edivydas, and Vykintas fled to Daniel of Galicia, who was married to Tautvilas' sister. They formed a powerful coalition with the Samogitians, the Livonian Order, and Vasilko of Volhynia in opposition to Mindaugas. An internal war erupted. While Daniel and the Livonian Order were organizing military campaigns into Mindaugas lands, Tautvilas travelled to Riga, where he was baptized by the archbishop in 1250.

Mindaugas thwarted the coalition by agreeing to baptize and relinquish control over some lands in the western Lithuania, for which he was to receive a crown in return. The Livonian Order became an ally. In 1252, Tautvilas and the remaining allies attacked Mindaugas in Voruta, sometimes considered to be the first capital of Lithuania. The attack failed and Tautvilas' forces retreated to defend themselves in Vykintas castle in the present-day Rietavas Municipality. Neither side seems to have won, but Vykintas died in or about 1253, and Tautvilas was forced to flee to Galicia. There he helped Daniel in an unsuccessful campaign against Bohemia. Daniel reconciled with Mindaugas in 1254 and Tautvilas recognized Mindaugas' superiority. In return, he received Polotsk as a fiefdom.

While governing Polotsk, his main concern was to secure a trading route from Polotsk along the Daugava to the upper Dnieper River. Tautvilas managed to take away the Principality of Vitebsk from the princes of Novogrudok. His son Constantine became the ruler of Vitebsk. After Mindaugas was assassinated by Treniota and Daumantas, Tautvilas wished to assume the title of grand duke of Lithuania, but was killed by his cousin Treniota in 1263.

== See also ==
- House of Mindaugas – family tree of Tautvilas
- Principality of Polotsk

== Sources ==
- Fennell, John (2014) [1983]. The Crisis of Medieval Russia, 1200–1304. Longman History of Russia. Routledge. ISBN 978-0-582-48150-3.
