= Daugėdai Eldership =

Eldership of Lithuania

The Daugėdai Eldership (Lithuanian: Daugėdų seniūnija) is an eldership of Lithuania, located in the Rietavas Municipality. In 2021 its population was 327.
