= Kingdom of Lithuania =

Lithuanian kingdom in 1250s–1260s

- 1251–1263
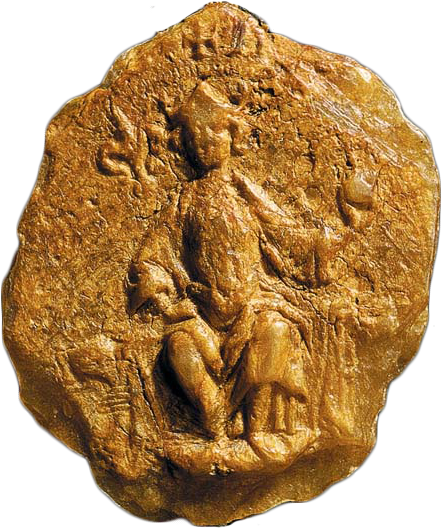
- Royal Seal of Mindaugas (c. 1255)

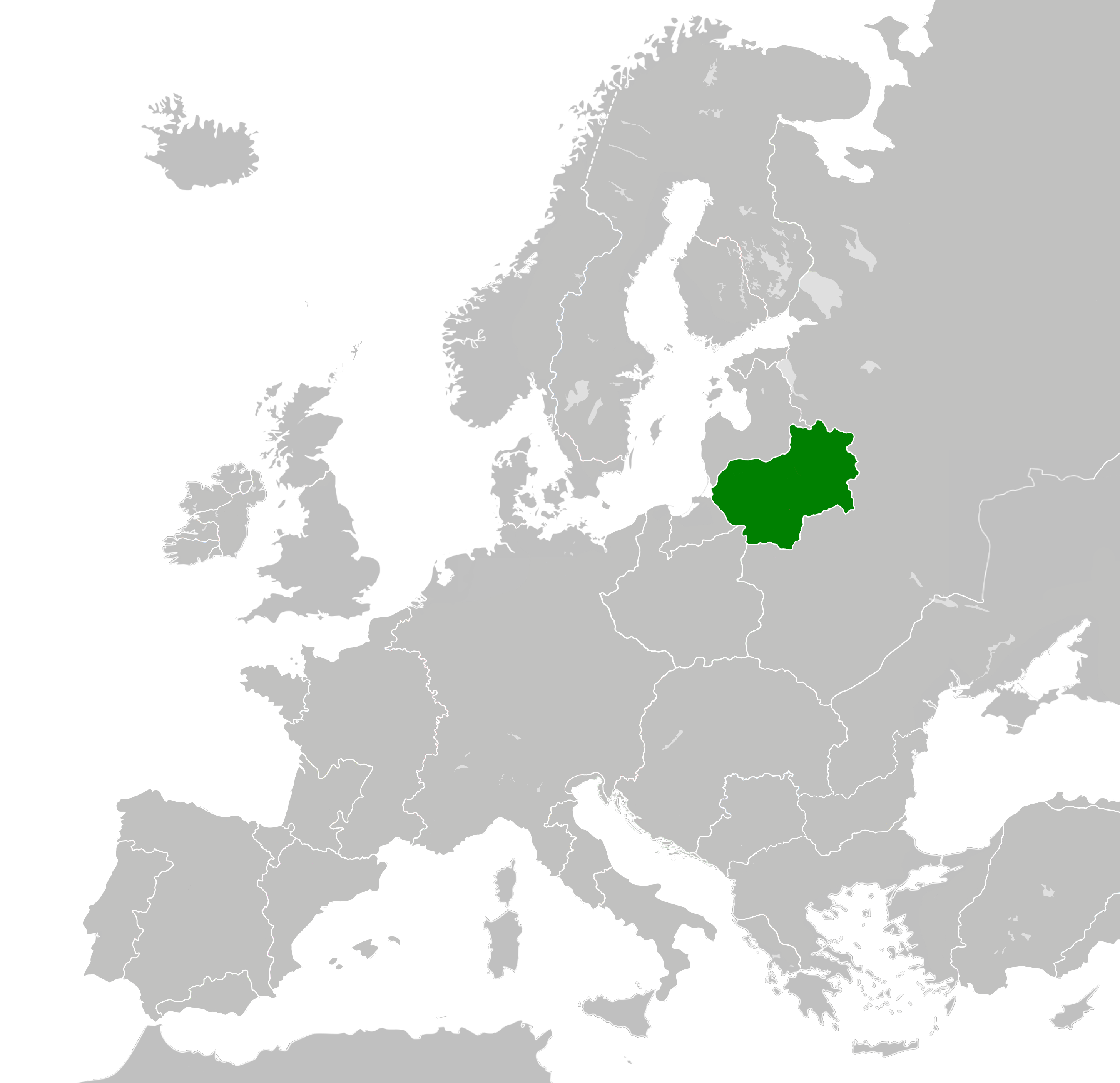
- Capital: Kernavė
- Common languages: Lithuanian, Ruthenian
- Religion: Catholicism (institutional); Lithuanian polytheism (widely practised); Eastern Orthodox Church (in eastern lands)
- Government: Hereditary feudal absolute monarchy
- King
  - 1251–1263: Mindaugas
- History
  - Established: 17 July 1251
  - Coronation of Mindaugas: 6 July 1253
  - Mindaugas assassinated: 12 September 1263
- Currency: Ilgasis
Preceded by	Succeeded by
Duchy of Lithuania	Grand Duchy of Lithuania

The Kingdom of Lithuania was a sovereign state that existed from 17 July 1251 until the death of the first crowned king of Lithuania, Mindaugas, on 12 September 1263. Mindaugas was the only Lithuanian monarch crowned king with the assent of the Pope and the head of the first Catholic Lithuanian state. The formation of the kingdom is widely regarded as a partially successful attempt at unifying all surrounding Baltic tribes, including the Old Prussians, into a single unified state under a common king.

Other monarchs of Lithuania were referred to as grand dukes, kings or emperors in extant foreign written sources as the size of the realm and their power expanded or contracted. This practice can be compared to that of British, Japanese and many other monarchs who are known as kings or emperors despite not being crowned with the assent of the Pope. Because Lithuania was pagan in the 13th century, Lithuanian rulers were not treated as equals to Catholic monarchs, even though extant Christian sources referred to them as kings or emperors regardless of their religious affiliation. For instance, Gediminas styled himself King of Lithuania and Rus, and Duke of Semigalia. The Pope also addressed him as King.

The confusion stems from the eastern and western European traditions of royal hierarchy and titles. In Eastern Europe, the title of grand duke equalled king and sometimes emperor. In Western Europe, the title of grand duke is reserved for monarchs of small polities and ranks junior to king and emperor.

After the formal Christianization and especially after the creation of the personal union with Poland, the monarchs of Poland–Lithuania retained the separate titles of Grand Dukes of Lithuania and Kings of Poland (similarly to how the Emperors of Austria–Hungary had retained the separate titles of Emperor of Austria and King of Hungary, to some extent).

The Catholic crown was to be received from the Pope or the Holy Roman Emperor. Lithuania was subservient to both and, with rare exceptions, did not pursue the title. For diplomatic reasons, three further attempts were made to re-establish the Kingdom status – by Vytautas the Great in 1430, by Švitrigaila, who wanted to continue Vytautas' attempts at the coronation, and by the Council of Lithuania in 1918.

== King Mindaugas ==
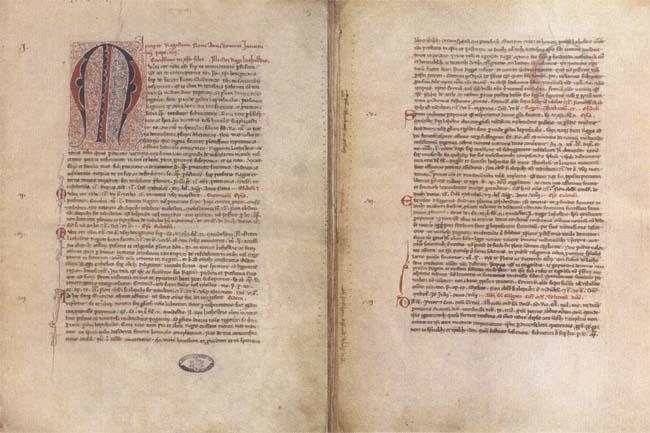
The papal bull regarding Lithuania's placement under the jurisdiction of the Bishop of Rome

In the early 13th century, Lithuania was inhabited by various polytheistic Baltic tribes, which began to organize themselves into a state – the Grand Duchy of Lithuania. By the 1230s, Mindaugas emerged as the leader of the Grand Duchy. In 1249, an internal war erupted between Mindaugas and his nephews Tautvilas and Edivydas. As each side searched for foreign allies, Mindaugas succeeded in convincing the Livonian Order not only to provide military assistance but also to secure for him the royal crown of Lithuania in exchange for his conversion to Catholicism and some lands in western Lithuania. The status of a kingdom was granted on 17 July 1251, when the Bishop of Chełmno was ordered to crown Mindaugas by Pope Innocent IV. Two years later, Mindaugas and his wife Morta were crowned King and Queen of Lithuania. In 1255, Mindaugas received permission from Pope Alexander IV to crown his son King of Lithuania.

The coronation and the alliance with the Livonian Order allowed for a period of peace between Lithuania and Livonia. During that time, the Lithuanians expanded east, while Livonia attempted to conquer Samogitia. Enticed by his nephew Treniota, Mindaugas broke the peace after the Order was defeated in the Battle of Skuodas in 1259 and the Battle of Durbe in 1260. Lithuanian forces were, however, unable to prevent the devastating Mongol invasion of Lithuania in 1258–1259. Treniota's influence grew as he waged a war against the Order and his priorities began to diverge from those of Mindaugas. The conflict resulted in the assassination of Mindaugas and two of his sons in 1263. The country reverted to paganism and its status as a kingdom was lost. The state survived as the Grand Duchy of Lithuania and the subsequent monarchs are known as Grand Dukes as they could not be crowned Kings until they converted to Christianity (the Christianization of Lithuania occurred only in 1387).

== Attempts to re-establish the Kingdom ==
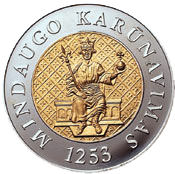
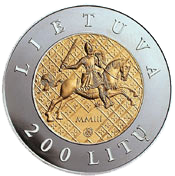
200 litas commemorative coin dedicated to the 750th anniversary of Mindaugas' coronation

There was an attempt by Grand Duke Vytautas the Great (ruled 1392–1430) to receive a Catholic crown. At the Congress of Lutsk in 1430, Sigismund, King of Hungary who was yet to be elected Holy Roman Emperor, offered Vytautas the crown and proclaimed Lithuania a (presumably subservient) kingdom. It did not come to fruition, because of the opposition from Polish nobles and later from his first cousin Jogaila. According to some historians, the crown was sent to Lithuania by Sigismund, but it was intercepted by Polish forces, but in reality, Sigismund sent only the documents proposing an alliance between him, Vytautas and the Teutonic Order, and judgement from legal experts that the coronation could be performed by the bishop of Vilnius. Soon afterwards, Vytautas died without having been crowned Catholic king.

Following the Union of Lublin, the Grand Duchy of Lithuania became a part of the Polish–Lithuanian Commonwealth. Kings of Poland were also crowned as Grand Dukes of Lithuania, and therefore they did not use the title of King of Lithuania; the two parts of the Commonwealth were known as the Grand Duchy and the Polish Crown.

After Lithuania declared independence in February 1918, the monarchy was re-established and the 2nd Duke of Urach was invited to become King Mindaugas II. However, the monarchy was short-lived and Mindaugas II never visited Lithuania. The Kingdom of Lithuania was a client-state of the German Empire, and following Germany's defeat in World War I in the fall of 1918, the idea of a monarchy was abandoned in favor of a democratic republic.

== See also ==
- Duchy of Lithuania
- Grand Duchy of Lithuania
- Kingdom of Lithuania (1918)
- Lithuania proper

== Bibliography ==
- Phillips, J. R. S. (1998). The Medieval Expansion of Europe. Oxford: Clarendon Press. ISBN 978-0-19-820740-5.
- Frost, Robert (2015). The Oxford History of Poland-Lithuania. The Making of the Polish-Lithuanian Union, 1385—1569. Oxford University Press. ISBN 978-0-19-820869-3.
