= Tverai Eldership =

Eldership of Lithuania

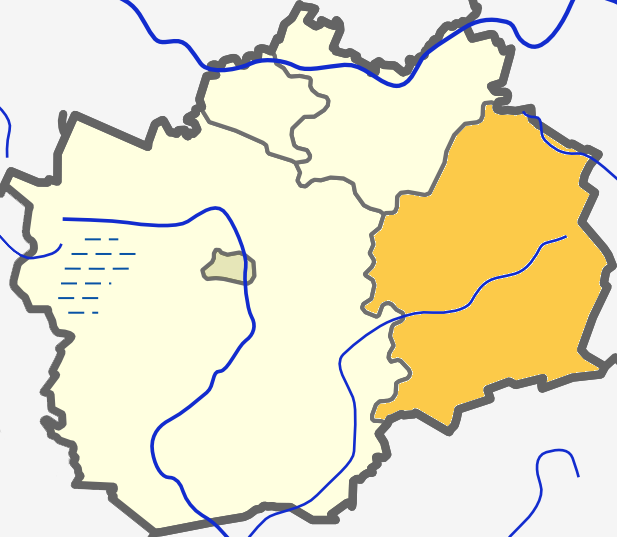
Location of Tverai Eldership on the map of Rietavas Municipality

The Tverai Eldership (Lithuanian: Tverų seniūnija) is an eldership of Lithuania, located in the Rietavas Municipality. In 2021 its population was 1071.
