= Daumantas of Pskov =

Prince of Pskov from 1266 to 1299

Daumantas
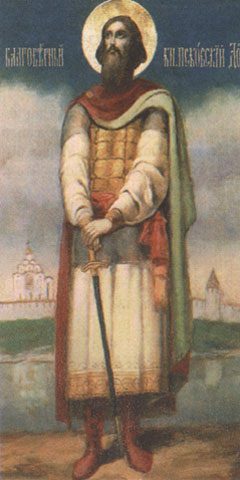
- Fresco of Daumantas in the Trinity Cathedral, Pskov, c. 14th century

Duke of Nalšia
- Reign: 1255–1266
- Predecessor: Daujotas (?)
- Successor: Gerdenis

Prince of Pskov
- Reign: 1266–1299
- Predecessor: Sviatoslav of Tver
- Successor: David of Grodno
- Born: c. 1221/1240
- Died: 20 May 1299
- Burial: Trinity Cathedral, Pskov
- Issue: David of Grodno (?)
- Religion: Lithuanian polytheism (until 1265); Eastern Orthodox (1265–1299)

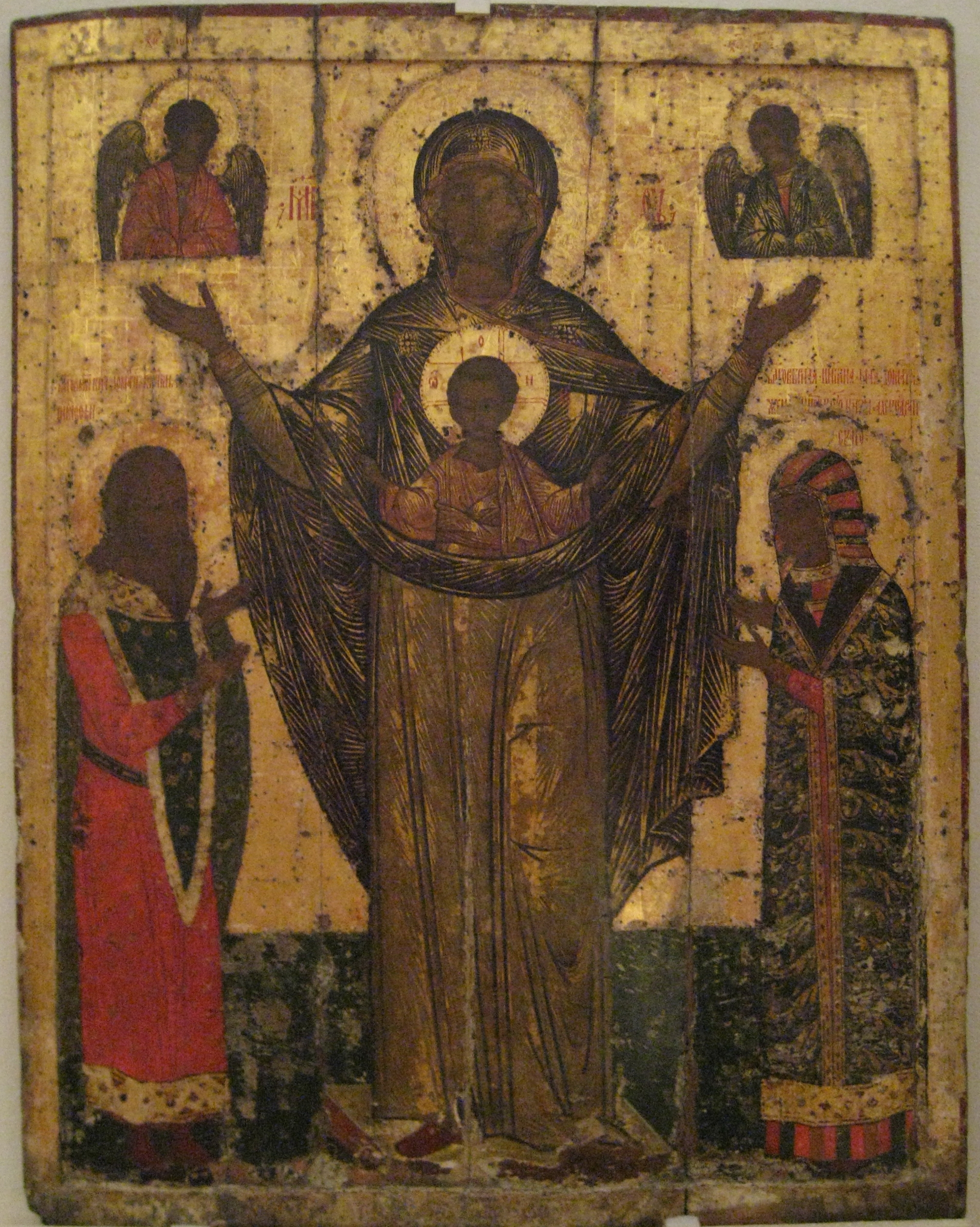
Our Lady of Mirozh with Daumantas and his wife Maria from the Mirozhsky Monastery

Daumantas (Note: Also known as Daumantas Pskoviškis and Domantas.) (Russian: Довмонт, romanized: Dovmont; Christian name: Timothy; Russian: Тимофей, romanized: Timofey; c. 1221/1240 – 20 May 1299) was a Lithuanian nobleman who served as Prince of Pskov from 1266 until his death in 1299.

Daumantas had no connection to medieval Russia in his early life; he was originally a duke of Nalšia in the Kingdom of Lithuania before fleeing Lithuania as a result of internal political conflict. He sought refuge in Pskov, eventually becoming its prince. Under his leadership, Pskov asserted greater political autonomy and achieved de facto independence from Novgorod. He died in Pskov during a plague outbreak.

From the time of his death, he has been venerated as the main patron saint of Pskov and the Russian army. He is venerated as a local saint, with his feast day commemorated on 20 May. The Russian Orthodox Church canonized him in the 16th century.

== Early life in Lithuania ==
Until 1265, Daumantas was the duke of Nalšia, a northern province of the Grand Duchy of Lithuania. Daumantas is first mentioned indirectly in historical sources around 1252 as Lithuanian king Mindaugas' brother-in-law, who participated in the defence of the king's castle in Voruta. Young, noble, and loyal to Mindaugas, Daumantas of Nalšia was elevated to the heights of kinship with the king himself. Daumantas married the sister of Mindaugas' second wife, Queen Morta of Lithuania. When Morta died in 1262, Mindaugas offended his brother-in-law Daumantas by inviting his wife to mourn the deceased queen, and after the funeral, he kept her as his wife so that she could raise his young children – allegedly at Morta's request before she died.

At that time, two relatives of Mindaugas secretly sought the Lithuanian throne: his cousin, the duke of Samogitia, Treniota, and his brother, the duke of Polotsk, Tautvilas. Daumantas conspired with them to remove the king of Lithuania in revenge. In the autumn of 1263, Daumantas killed Mindaugas and his sons Ruklys and Repeikis, and Treniota became the de facto king of Lithuania. During Treniota's reign from 1263 to 1264, Daumantas lived undisturbed in Lithuania and retained the title of duke of Nalšia.

Treniota did not remain in power for long, as Mindaugas' supporters soon assassinated him. In 1264, supported by Lithuanian soldiers from Novogrudok, Pinsk, and allied with Duke Shvarn of Galicia–Volhynia, Mindaugas' son Vaišelga returned to Lithuania in 1264 to reclaim his father's throne. He started wiping out his family's enemies in the duchies of Nalšia and Deltuva. Seeing this, Daumantas fled to Pskov with his family and army of 300 men. He first negotiated with Pskov in 1265 and arrived the following year following his defeat by Vaišelga.

== Prince of Pskov ==
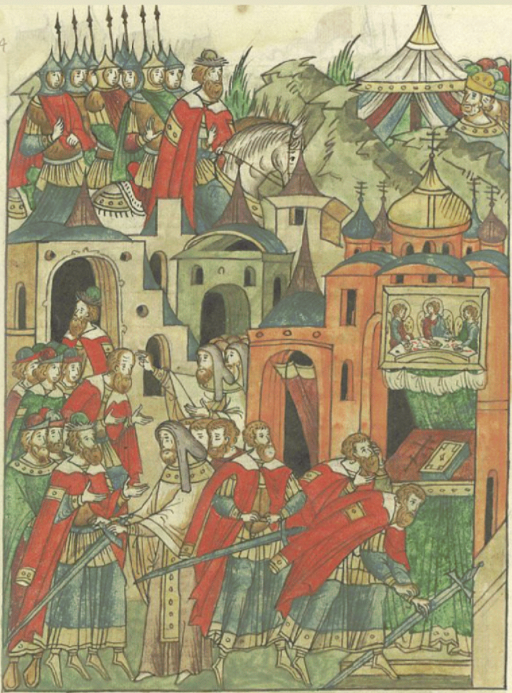
Prince Daumantas lays his sword before the holy altar in the Church of the Holy Trinity before a military campaign, miniature from the Illustrated Chronicle of Ivan the Terrible (16th century)

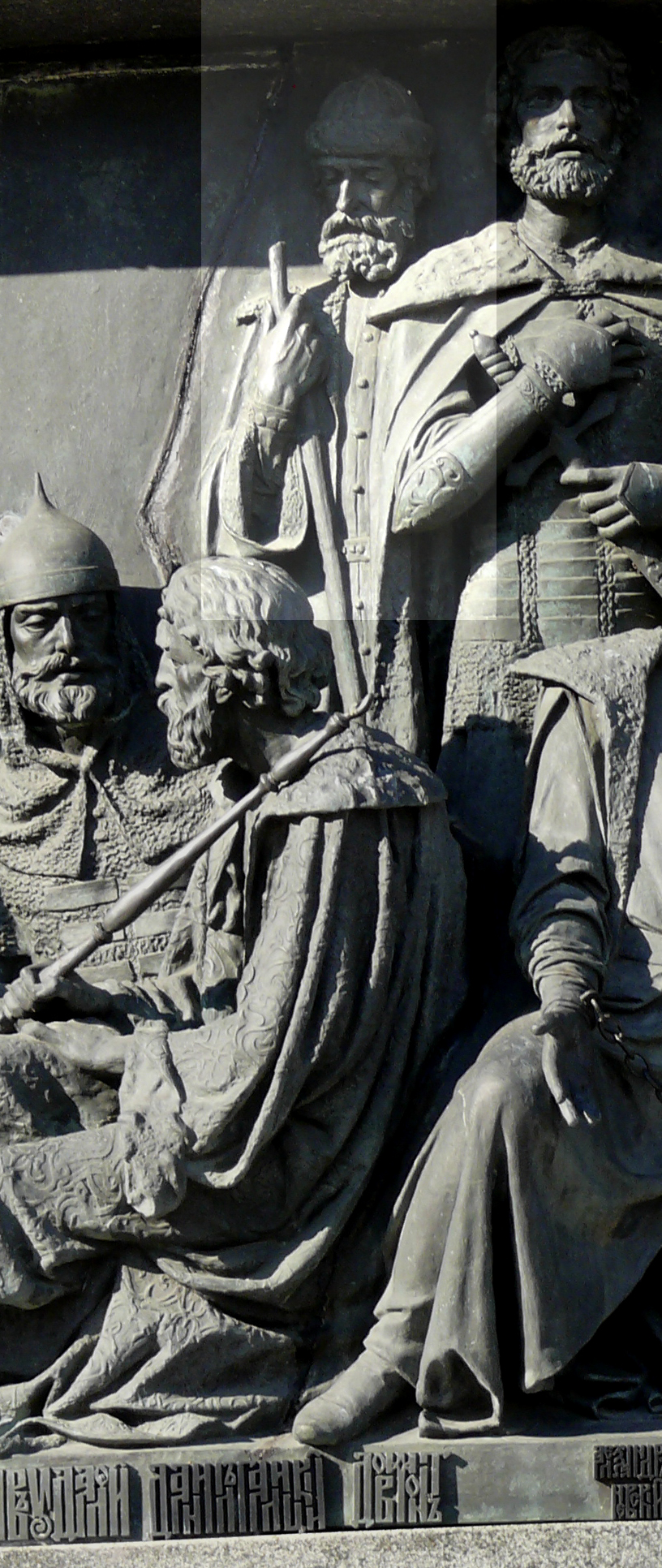
Daumantas on the Millennium of Russia monument in Veliky Novgorod

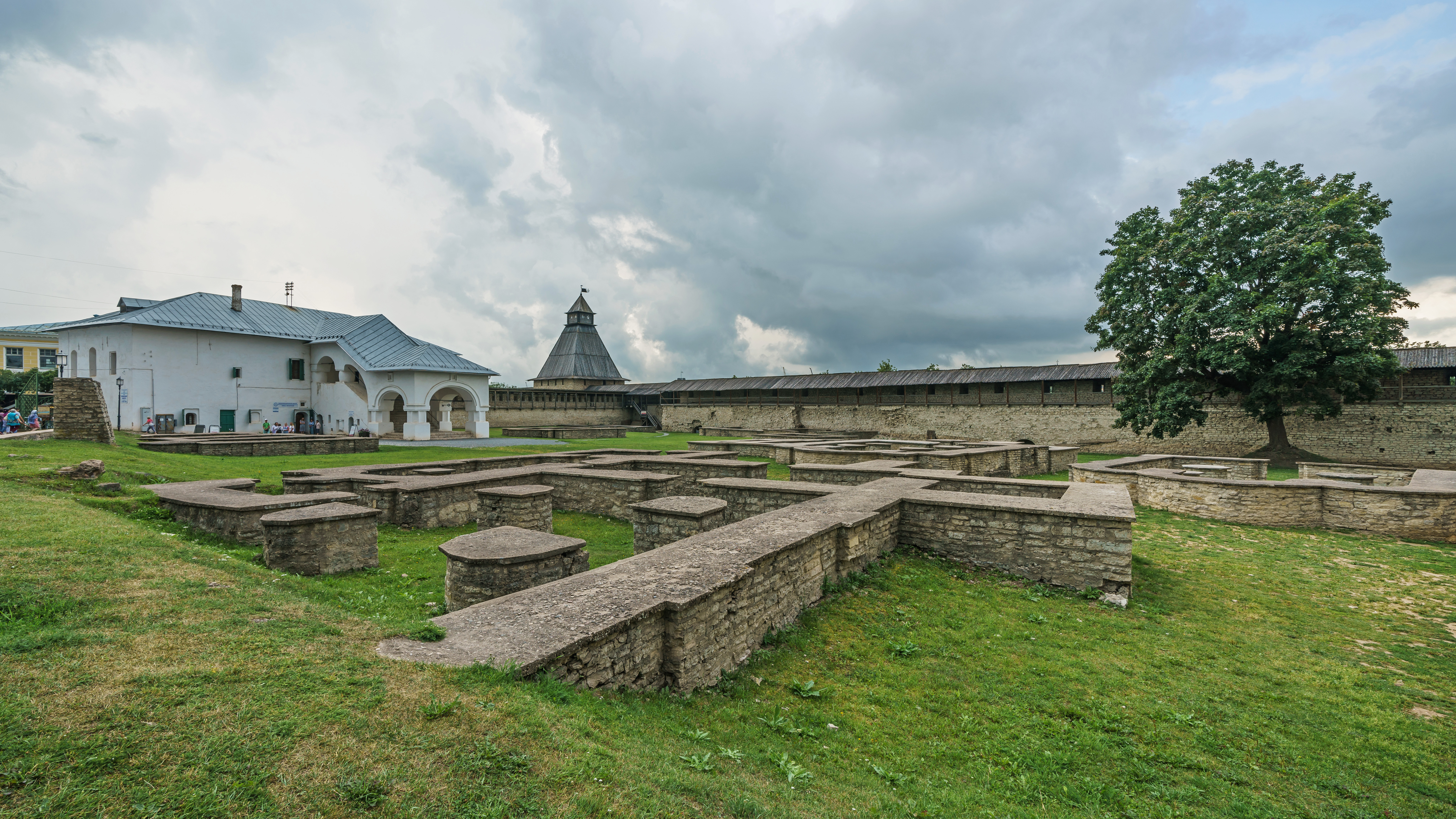
Daumantas Walls in Pskov

The sudden arrival of hundreds of Lithuanians in Pskov frightened and angered the people of Novgorod, who even attempted to kill the fugitives. They were defended and baptized into Eastern Orthodoxy by Prince Sviatoslav, the son of Prince Yaroslav of Novgorod. Daumantas was given the baptismal name of Timothy (Timofey), and married a daughter of Dmitry of Pereslavl, son of Alexander Nevsky. After settling in Pskov, Daumantas led the Pskovian armies against the Lithuanians and forced them to retreat to the banks of the Daugava River. He directed his revenge against the new duke of Nalšia, Gerdenis, who was loyal to Vaišelga. In 1266–1267, Daumantas attacked his enemies in north-eastern Lithuania three times. During the attacks, he kidnapped Girdenis' wife and two sons (one of whom would later become the bishop Andrius of Tver). Daumantas' success of his military expertise persuaded the Pskovians to elect him as their knyaz (prince), or military leader.

In January 1268, the Pskovian–Novgorodian alliance was cemented when Daumantas joined several Russian princes in invading Danish Estonia together. The Pskovians, led by Daumantas, joined their forces with the Novgorodians led by Alexander Nevsky's son Dmitry and looted the Danish Estonian countryside. They fought the Livonian Knights and the local Estonian militia at the Battle of Rakvere on 18 February 1268. The following year, the master of the Livonian Order, Otto von Lutterberg, led Livonian forces to the territory of Pskov, burned the Izborsk castle, and laid siege to Pskov itself, but Daumantas, after receiving support from the Novgorodians, withstood the siege and managed to conclude a truce with the Livonians.

In 1270, Yaroslav again attempted to interfere in Pskovian affairs by replacing Daumantas with another Lithuanian prince. The Pskovians stood up for Daumantas, forcing Yaroslav to abandon his plans. The following spring, Daumantas became prince again. On 8 June 1272, Daumantas defeated Livonian forces near Pskov and then devasted the Estonian territories held by the Livonian Order. In 1278, he took part in a campaign led by Dmitry against the Karelians, and on 8 June, he again defeated the Livonians near Pskov.

In the 1280s and 1290s, Daumantas supported the foreign policy of Novgorod's princes, Dmitry and Andrey, who also served as the grand princes of Vladimir. In 1282, when Dmitry was ousted from Vladimir to Koporye and his family was captured by the Novgorodians, Daumantas made a sally into Ladoga, where he captured Dmitry's treasury from the Novgorodians and transported it to Koporye. He also freed Dmitry's two daughters and boyars. Around this time, he married one of Dmitry's daughters, Maria.

In 1285, together with the Pskovites, Daumantas launched a campaign against the Principality of Tver. He was defeated by the combined forces of north-eastern Russia and taken prisoner, but he was soon released. In 1293, during Dyuden's campaign against north-eastern Russia, Dmitry hid in Pskov.

On 4 March 1299, the Livonian Order unexpectedly invaded north-western Russia and laid siege to Pskov. Daumantas inflicted another defeat on them following a battle on the banks of the Velikaya River. The captured prisoners were then sent to Andrey in Vladimir.

During a plague outbreak, Daumantas died on 20 May 1299. He was survived by his alleged son, David of Grodno, and was buried in the Trinity Cathedral, where his sword and personal effects would be on exhibit until the 20th century.

== Legacy ==
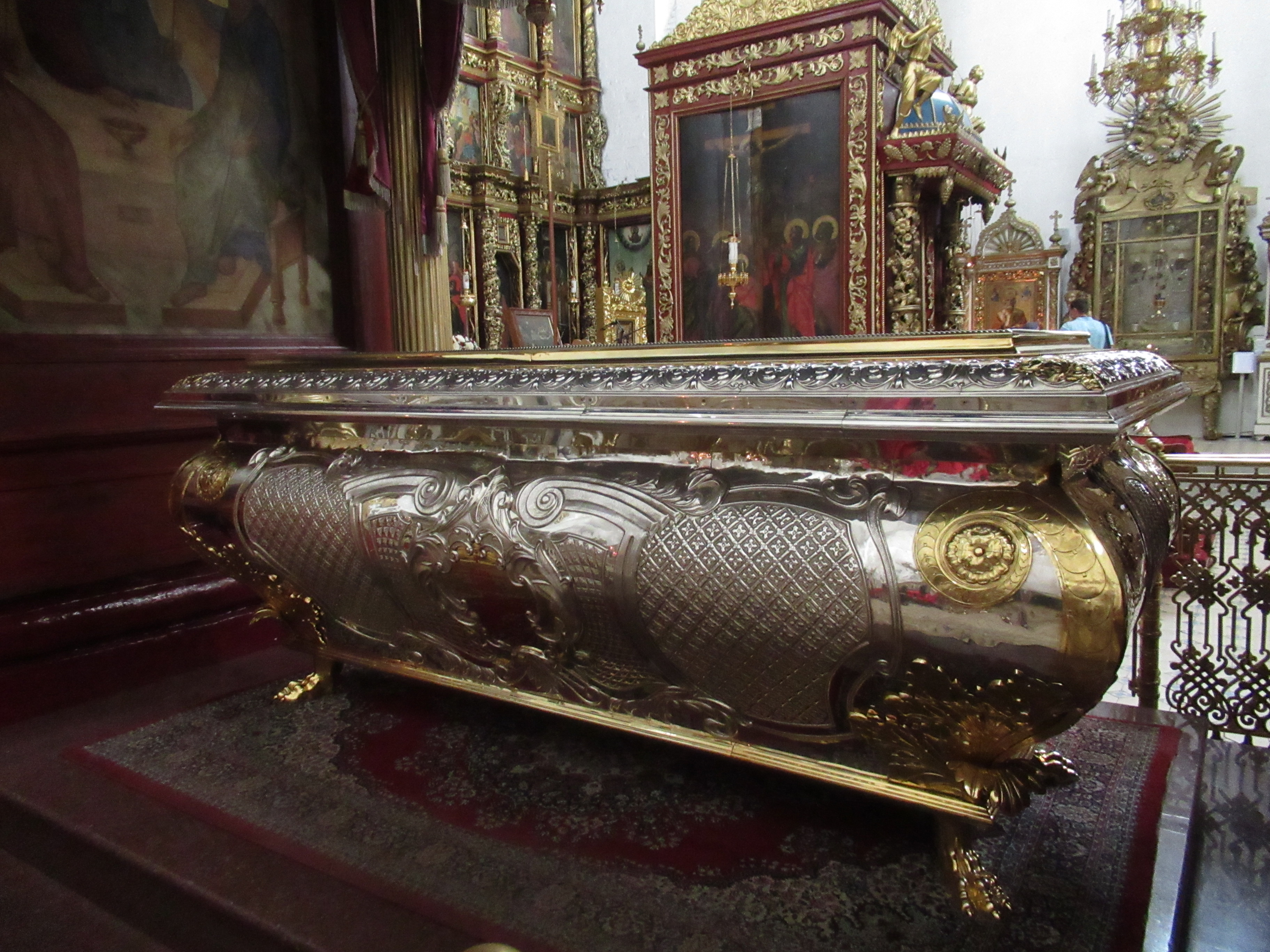
The remains of Daumantas are held in Pskov's Trinity Cathedral

According to the Pskovian Chronicles, no ruler was loved by the citizens of Pskov more than Daumantas; they particularly praised his military skills and wisdom. In 1460, when Prince Yury (George), son of Grand Prince Vasily II of Moscow, ascended the throne of Pskov, the Pskovites "seated him on the table in the Holy Trinity and placed a sword in the hand of his prince Daumantas".

From the time of his death, he was venerated as a local saint and came to be regarded as the main patron saint of Pskov, as well as the Russian army, with Russian scribes placing him on par with Alexander Nevsky as a defender of Orthodox Russia. The fortifications erected by Daumantas in Pskov's downtown became known as the Daumantas Walls. A church dedicated to the prince was built in Pskov in 1567. The Russian Orthodox Church canonized him in the 16th century.
