= Traidenis =

Grand Duke of Lithuania from c. 1270 to 1282

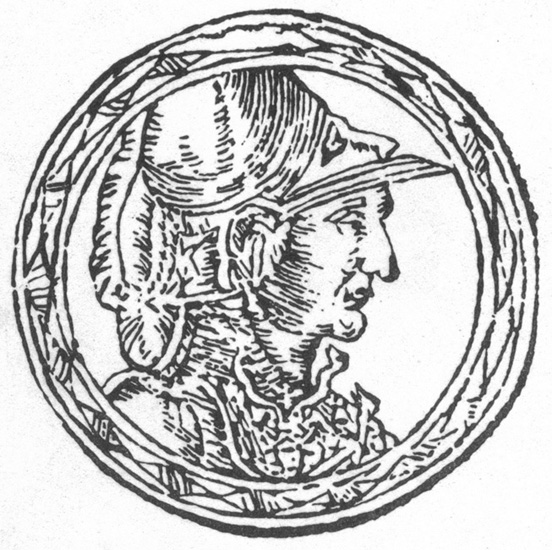
- Imaginative depiction of Traidenis by Alexander Guagnini, 16th-century

Grand Duke of Lithuania
- Reign: 1269–1282
- Predecessor: Shvarn
- Successor: Daumantas

Duke of Kernavė
- Reign: until 1269
- Born: c. 1220
- Died: Spring 1282; Kernavė
- Spouse: Anna of Mazovia
- Issue: Gaudemunda of Lithuania
- House: Mindaugas
- Religion: Lithuanian polytheism

Traidenis (Note: in other languages also known as: Polish: Trojden; Belarusian: Трайдзень) (died 1282) was Grand Duke of Lithuania from 1269 or 1270 until 1282. He is the second most prominent grand duke of Lithuania in the 13th century after Mindaugas. His reign ended a seven-year unrest period after King Mindaugas was assassinated in 1263 and firmly established Lithuania as a pagan state for another hundred years.

Traidenis expanded the Grand Duchy into the territories of Sudovians and Semigalians and strengthened its presence in Black Ruthenia. Unlike Mindaugas, Traidenis did not concentrate on expansion into the east.

== Rise to power ==
While his ancestry is unknown, it is known that he came from Aukštaitija, and before becoming the Grand Duke, he was Duke of Kernavė. On the eve of Traidenis' ascension to the throne in 1268, the legitimacy of the Lithuanian monarch as an institution was compromised. In 1264, Vaišelga Mindaugaitis, who had temporarily renounced his Orthodox monk's vows, ascended to the Lithuanian throne of his murdered father, King Mindaugas, and consolidated his power in the country. He relied consistently on the military forces of the princes of Halych-Volhynia. Consequently, he was compelled to share the authority in Lithuania with them, appointing Vasylko Romanovych, the Prince of Volhynia, as the supreme ruler (sovereign) of Lithuania and bestowing his brother-in-law, Shvarn, the Prince of Halych, with control over Navahrudak and its dependent domains. Nevertheless, effective power within the state remained vested in Grand Duke Vaišelga.

Traidenis, however, perceived the rule of a Lithuanian Orthodox monarch—particularly one reliant on Ruthenian Orthodox military support—as a threat to Lithuania's recently reasserted polytheistic traditions and launched his claim to the throne. In 1267, the Orthodox triumvirate governing Lithuania, comprising Vaišelga, Shvarn, and Vasilko, was dissolved. Facing the lack of direct heirs of the House of Mindaugas, Vaišelga abdicated the throne in favour of his brother-in-law Shvarn, and returned to monastic life. Concurrently, Vasilko, whose Lithuanian rights had previously shielded him from the emerging throne claimant Traidenis, saw these rights terminated following Vaišelga's abdication.

The precise circumstances surrounding Traidenis' removal of Shvarn from power and subsequent ascension remain undocumented. In late 1267, Volodymyr in Volhynia hosted a meeting between Vaišelga, Vasilko, and Leo—the brother of Shvarn—to deliberate on authority in Lithuania. Enraged by Vaišelga’s earlier transfer of Lithuanian rulership to Shvarn rather than himself (as recorded in the Halych-Volhynian Chronicle), Leo assassinated Vaišelga. Whether Traidenis conspired with Leo to assassinate Vaišelga remains uncertain, but their concurrent actions suggest that Leo consented to non-interference during Traidenis' campaign for the throne. Traidenis consolidated control and moved against Vaišelga’s loyalists in Lithuania. With Shvarn absent from the succession struggle and Vaišelga eliminated, Vasilko alone contested Traidenis’ rule. Throughout 1268, he waged a solitary campaign for power in Lithuania without Leo’s support. The war proved devastating: Traidenis lost three brothers—Barza, Liesis, and Svalkenis—in the fighting. Vasilko was ultimately defeated and died shortly thereafter, with his lands reverting to Lithuania.

== Reign ==
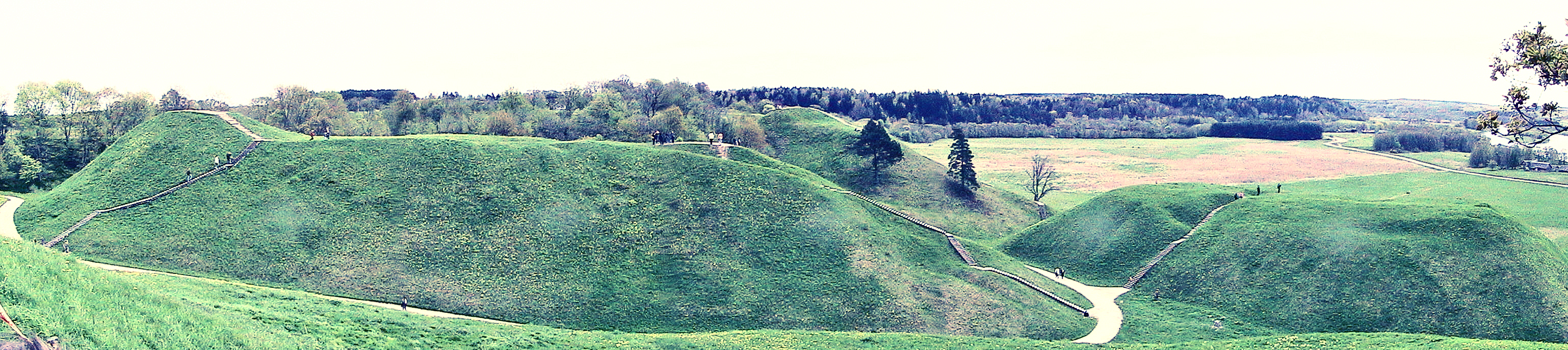
Kernavė hill forts. Kernavė was the Ducal Seat of Traidenis and the capital of Lithuania

From the outset, his relationships with Galicia–Volhynia were tense as he replaced the previous Grand Duke of Lithuania and Duke of Galicia–Volhynia Shvarn. The tension eventually resulted in the 1274–1276 war. Despite Mongol support to Galicia–Volhynia, Traidenis was successful in battle, and his control over Black Ruthenia (Novogrudok, Grodno, Slonim, and other cities) was strengthened, and those lands were incorporated into Lithuania. Traidenis also made incursions into Poland, especially the surroundings of Lublin and Łęczyca, that continued to about 1306. However, these raids did not affect Masovia as Traidenis became the first Lithuanian ruler to establish dynastic ties with the Piast Dukes of Masovia through strategic marriages: In 1279, Bolesław II of Masovia married Traidenis' daughter princess Gaudemunda, while Traidenis married Ludmila, daughter of Konrad I of Masovia. In homage to his father-in-law, Bolesław II named his firstborn son Traidenis (Polish: Trojden I). This alliance inaugurated over a century of sustained political cooperation between Lithuania and Masovia.

Traidenis, known for his devotion to Lithuanian polytheism and anti-German attitude, was also successful in fighting against the Livonian Order. In 1270, he won the Battle of Karuse, fought on ice near Saaremaa, and killed Otto von Lutterberg, master of the Order. A new master, Andreas von Westfalen, sought quick revenge, but was also killed by Traidenis. However, by 1272 the Order retaliated, attacking Semigalia and building Dinaburg Castle in 1273 on lands nominally controlled by Traidenis. Despite four siege engines used to throw boulders, he was unable to capture the new fortress and had to retreat in 1278. In 1279, the order attacked Lithuanian lands, reaching as far as Kernavė, but on their way back, they suffered a great defeat in the Battle of Aizkraukle. The Order's master, Ernst von Rassburg, became the third master to be killed by Traidenis. The defeat encouraged the conquered Semigallians to rebel against the Order. The Semigallians, led by Nameisis, were now willing to acknowledge Lithuania's superiority and asked Traidenis for assistance. Traidenis supported the revolt, ultimately incorporating segments of their lands into Lithuania. Though unable to provide timely support for the faltering Great Prussian Uprising, Traidenis launched military campaigns to aid the Yotvingians and Sudovians against Teutonic Order conquests, subsequently annexing portions of their territories to the Grand Duchy of Lithuania. He granted asylum to Prussian and Skalvian refugees fleeing to Lithuania.

In 1281, Traidenis conquered Jersika Castle in the present-day Preiļi district, and was able to exchange it for Dinaburg Castle. However, Traidenis died soon afterwards, and assistance to Semigalians, exhausted by constant warfare, diminished.

== Legacy ==
Traidenis restored the Lithuanian state as more unified than under King Mindaugas, establishing strong monarchical authority over an integrated core of ethnic Lithuanian lands. To this nucleus, the neighbouring Ruthenian territories of Polotsk and Navahrudak were progressively annexed by Lithuania. He dealt significant blows to Halych-Volhynia, the Livonian Order, and the Teutonic Knights. This reinvigorated Lithuania passed to the House of Gediminas and continued its expansion.

Traidenis’ consolidation of power in Lithuania simultaneously restored Leo’s dominant position within the Romanovych dynasty of Halych-Volhynia. However, it provoked fierce opposition from Leo’s cousin Prince Vladimir Vasilkovich and the Orthodox clergy, who viewed Lithuania’s shift as a deviation from its projected Orthodox future. Traidenis is the first known Lithuanian monarch to have died a natural death. All others before him were assassinated or killed in battle.

== Family ==
Brothers

- Bardis, Liesis, and Svalkenis were Eastern Orthodox and died in fights with Galicia–Volhynia
- Sirputis assisted his brother in military campaigns

Daughter

- Gaudemunda, married Bolesław II, Duke of Masovia, becoming Duchess of Masovia

Preceded by Shvarn	Grand Duke of Lithuania; 1269/1270–1282	Succeeded by Daumantas
