= Voruta =

Purported historical capital of Lithuania

Voruta may have been the capital city of the Grand Duchy of Lithuania and the Kingdom of Lithuania during the reign of king Mindaugas in the 13th century. Voruta is mentioned briefly in a written source only once and its exact location is unknown. Despite all the uncertainties, the concept of Voruta is well-known and popular in Lithuania.

== Historiography ==
Mindaugas, the first and the only crowned Lithuanian king, defended himself in Voruta during an internal war against his nephews Tautvilas and Edivydas and Duke of Samogitia Vykintas in 1251. This information, taken from the Hypatian Chronicle, is the only recorded message about Voruta. A castle of Mindaugas was mentioned on two more occasions, but neither its name nor location was specified. It is unclear whether these brief mentions referred to the same location.

Nevertheless, some historians in 19th and 20th centuries called it "the first capital of Lithuania" and attempted to identify its location. In total there were about fifteen suggested locations of Voruta. Others argue that Voruta was not an actual city, but just a misinterpretation of a word that means capital. In the opinion of Kazimieras Būga, one of the prominent Lithuanian philologists, the word voruta simply means castle.

== List of suggested locations ==
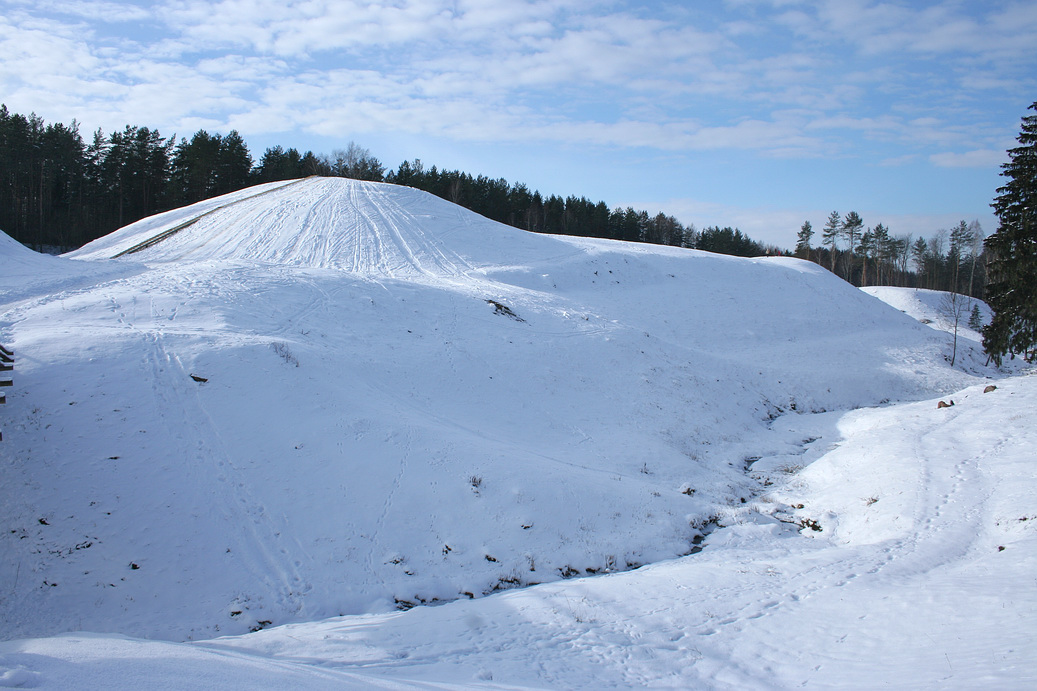
Šeiminyškėliai Hillfort in the east of Lithuania, one of the presumed sites of Voruta

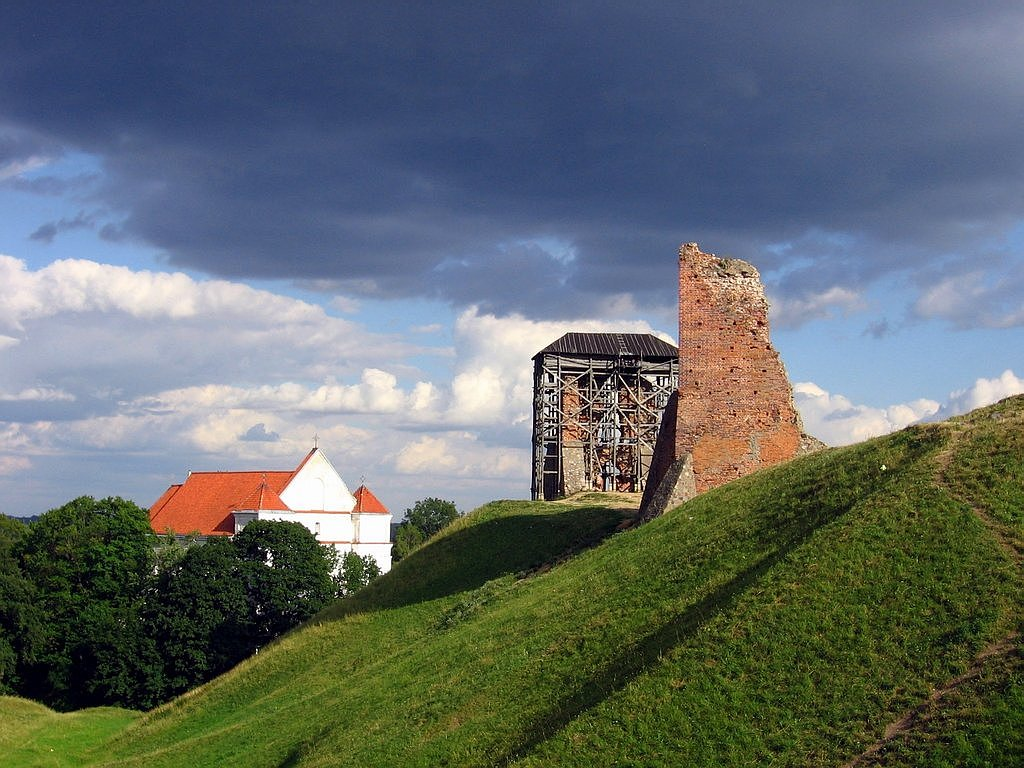
Ruins of Navahrudak Castle in the west of Belarus, also a possible site of Voruta

These sites were suggested by various historians in various times:

1. Berzgainiai in Ukmergė district by Petras Tarasenka
2. Buteikiai in Anykščiai district by Kazimieras Žebrys
3. Gorodishche near Navahrudak by Teodor Narbutt
4. Halshany (Lithuanian: Alšėnai) by Alyaksandr Krawtsevich
5. Kernavė by Fryderyk Papée
6. Karelichy (Lithuanian: Koreličiai) by Mikola Yermalovich
7. Liškiava by Jonas Totoraitis
8. Medininkai by Evaldas Gečiauskas
9. Ročiškė in Raseiniai district by Ludwik Krzywicki
10. Šeimyniškėliai in Anykščiai district by Eduards Volters (supported by Tomas Baranauskas)
11. Ūturiai in Raseiniai district by Wojciech Kętrzyński
12. Varniany (Lithuanian: Varnionys) in Hrodna Voblast, Belarus by Juliusz Latkowski
13. Vilnius by Romas Batūra
14. Area of Daugai–Varėna by Henryk Łowmiański
15. Area of Medvėgalis–Varniai by Antanas Steponaitis

Since publication, some of the theories have been largely discredited.
