= Tverai =

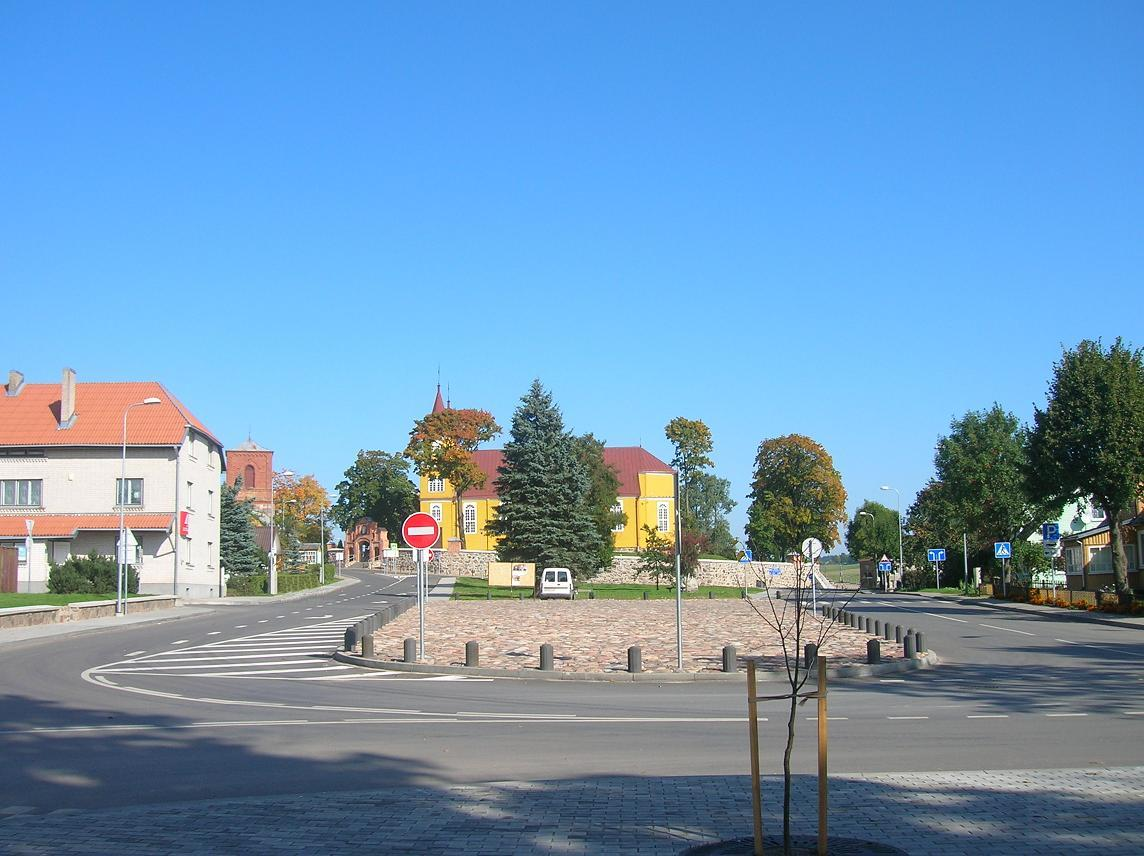
- Centre

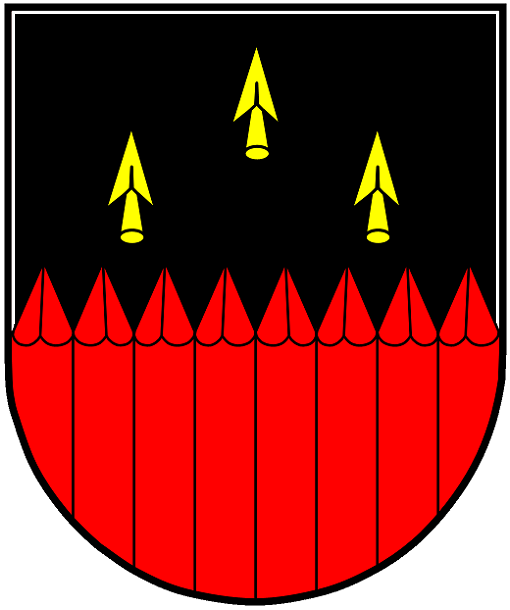
- Coat of arms

- Location of Tverai
- Coordinates: 55°44′00″N 22°08′40″E
- Country: Lithuania
- Ethnographic region: Samogitia
- County: Telšiai County
- Municipality: Rietavas district municipality
- Elderate: Tverai elderate

Population (2011)
  - Total: 558
- Time zone: UTC+2 (EET)
  - Summer (DST): UTC+3 (EEST)

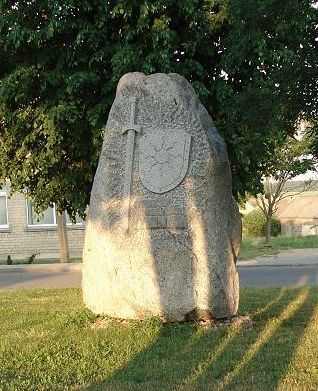
Monument to Duke Vykintas

Tverai (Samogitian: Tverā) is a small town in Rietavas municipality, Lithuania. It is situated on Aitra River, tributary to Jūra, about 17 km east from Rietavas and 14 km from Varniai. Tverai, with population of about 560, is a capital of an elderate.

== History ==
Tverai is identified with Tviriment Castle, mentioned in 1251 by the Hypatian Codex. The castle was the fortress where Vykintas, Duke of Samogitia and victorious leader of the Battle of Saule, defended himself against Mindaugas, crowned as King of Lithuania in 1253, during a civil war for power in the early Grand Duchy of Lithuania. Vykintas was defeated and Mindaugas became the undisputeded monarch. During World War II, a group of Jews were murdered in summer and fall of 1941.
