= Gedvydas =

Lithuanian noble (died c. 1253)

Gedvydas (or Edivid; died c. 1253) was one of the sons of Dausprungas and nephews of Lithuanian king Mindaugas. Gedvydas together with his brother Tautvilas and uncle Vykintas waged a civil war against Mindaugas. Gedvydas' brother and uncle were more active and Gedvydas played just a secondary role in the conflict. The war resulted in the coronation of Mindaugas.

== Life ==
In 1248, Mindaugas sent Tautvilas, Gedvydas, and Vykintas to conquer Smolensk, promising that they could keep what they would conquer. On the Protva River they defeated and killed the first prince of Moscow, Mikhail Khorobrit, but near Zubtsov lost to the grand prince of Vladimir-Suzdal. After discovering about the failure, Mindaugas took their land and property for himself. At the beginning of 1249, Tautvilas, Gedvydas, and Vykintas fled to Daniel of Halych, who was married to Gedvydas' sister. They formed a powerful coalition with the Samogitians, the Livonian Order, and Vasilko of Volhynia in opposition to Mindaugas. An internal war erupted. Daniel and the Livonian Order organized several military campaigns into Mindaugas' lands.

The Livonian Order became an ally of Mindaugas after he agreed to get baptized. In 1251, the remaining allies attacked Mindaugas in Voruta, but the attack failed. Tautvilas' and Gedvydas' forces retreated to defend themselves in Vykintas' castle in the present-day Rietavas municipality. Neither side seems to have won. Vykintas died in or about 1253, and Gedvydas was forced to flee to Halych. There he helped Daniel in an unsuccessful campaign against Bohemia. This is the last mention of Gedvydas in written sources, and historians assume he perished in the battle.

== See also ==
- House of Mindaugas – family tree of Gedvydas and Tautvilas
