= Leo I of Galicia =

King of Ruthenia (1269–1301)

Leo I
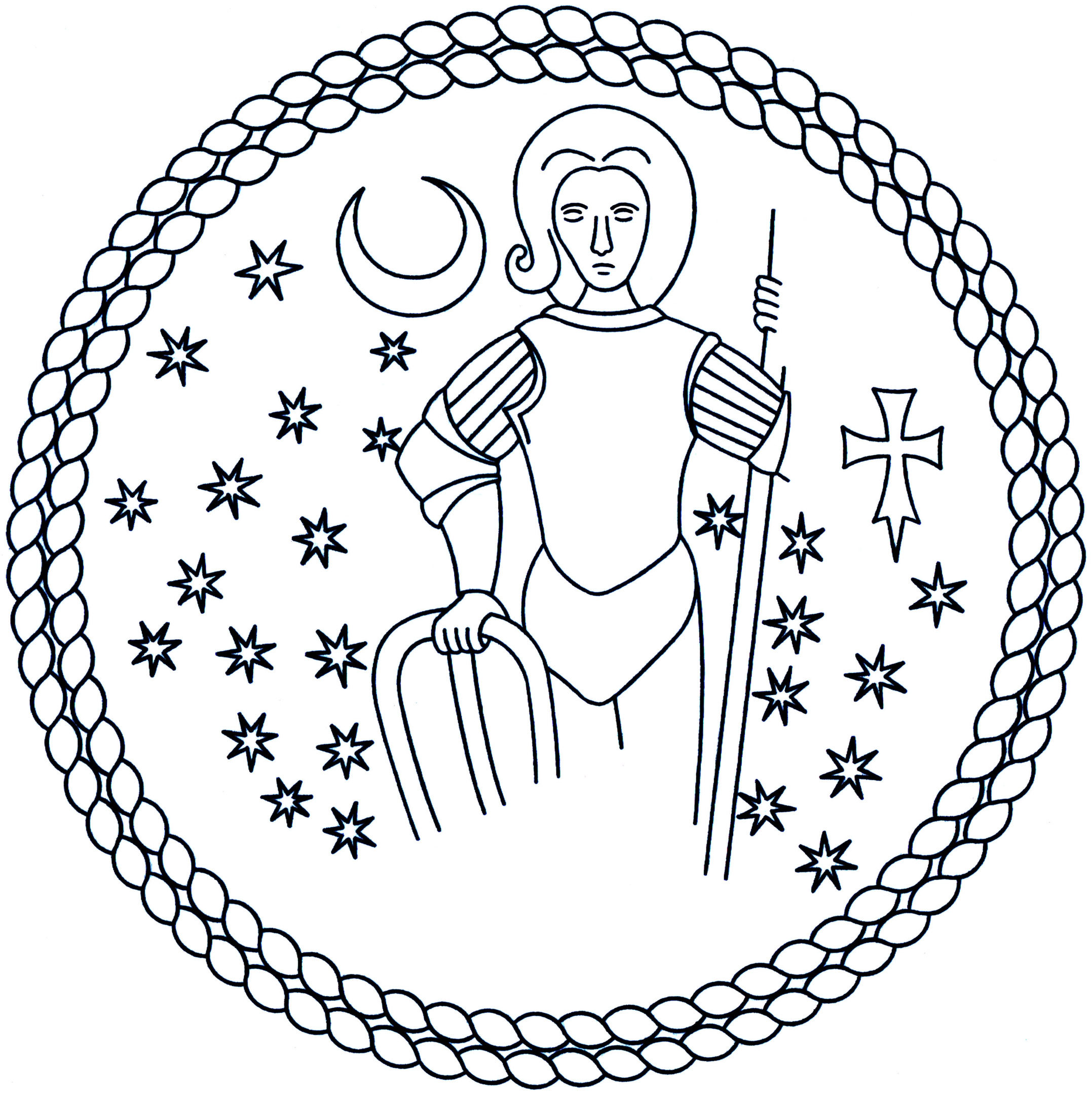
- Drawing of the obverse of the royal seal attributed to Leo, which was used by his descendants on the throne of Galicia-Volhynia

King of Ruthenia
- Reign: 1269–1301
- Predecessor: Daniel I
- Successor: Yuri I

Grand Prince of Kiev
- Reign: 1271–1301
- Predecessor: Yaroslav of Tver
- Successor: Ivan-Volodymyr
- Born: c. 1228
- Died: c. 1301 (aged c. 73)
- Spouse: Constance of Hungary
- Issue: Yuri I of Galicia; Svyatoslava of Halych; Anastasia of Galicia
- House: Romanovichi
- Father: Daniel of Galicia
- Mother: Anna Mstyslavna Smolenska

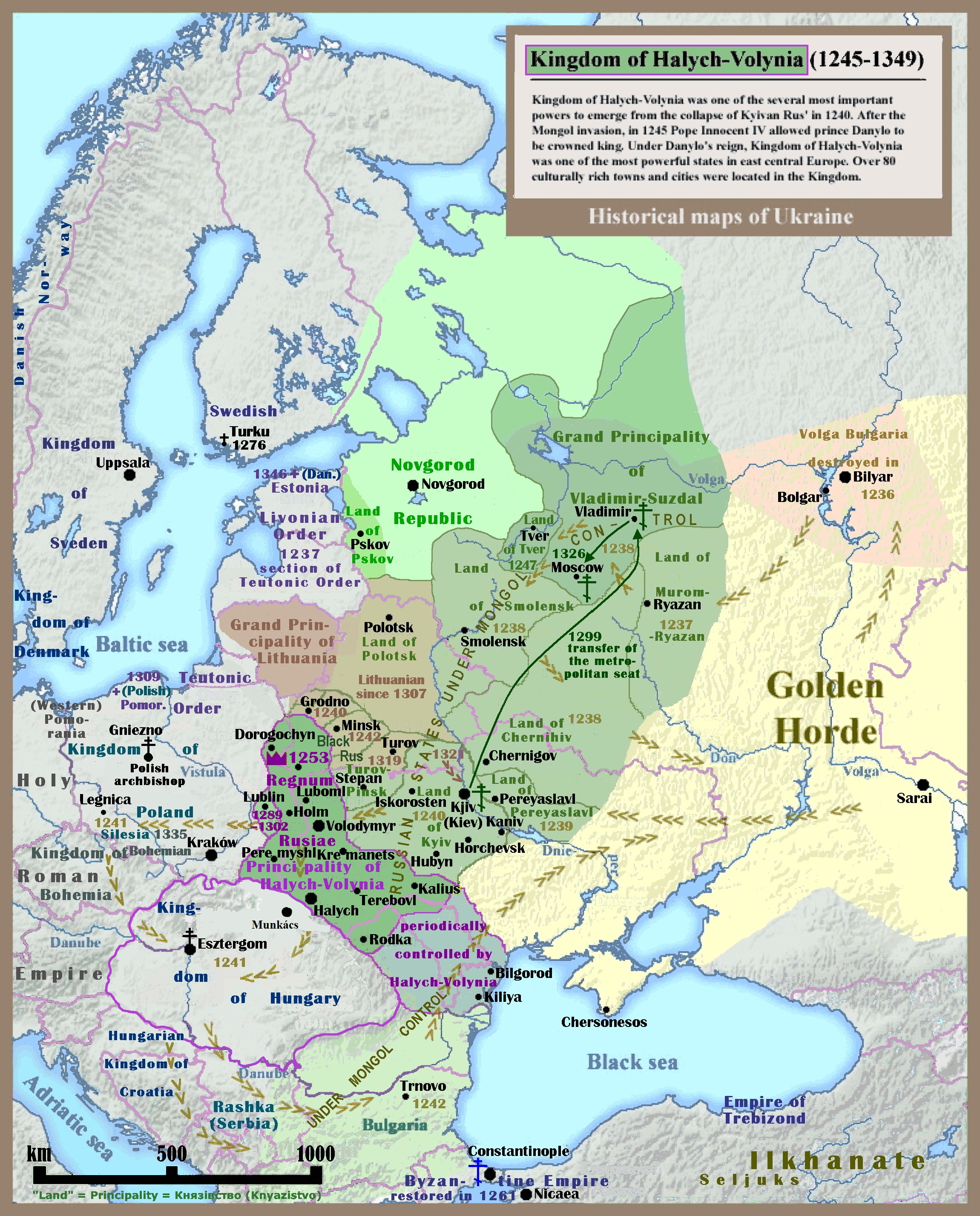
The Kingdom of Galicia–Volhynia (1245–1349; purple border).

Leo I of Galicia (Old Ruthenian: Левъ Данилович; Ukrainian: Лев Дани́лович, romanized: Lev Danýlovych; Latin: Leo dux Ruthenorum; c. 1228 – c. 1301) was King of Ruthenia, Prince of Belz (1245–1264), Przemyśl, Galicia (1264–1269), and Kiev (1271–1301).

He was a son of King Daniel of Galicia and his first wife, Anna Mstislavna Smolenskaia (daughter of Mstislav Mstislavich the Bold). As his father, Lev was a member of the senior branch of Vladimir II Monomakh descendants.

== Early life ==
As a child, Leo took part in the Battle of Jarosław, in which his father defeated the coalition of prince Rostislav Mikhailovich, a pretender to Galician throne, and returned control over Halych. In 1247, Leo married Constance, the daughter of Béla IV of Hungary. In 1252 he supported his younger brother Roman Danylovich in Bohemia during the fight over the Austrian succession of the Babenberg dynasty. Later that year he led Galician troops against the Tatars near Bakota. In the following years Leo helped Daniel to fight against the Yotvingians, Lithuanians and forces of the Golden Horde. In 1262 Leo took part in the meeting of his father and other Rus' princes with Polish duke Bolesław V the Chaste in Ternawa.

== Reign ==
After inheriting the Galician throne upon the death of Daniel in 1264, Leo moved the principality's capital from Halych to the newly founded city of Lviv, which had been named after him by his father. Unlike his predecessor, who pursued a western political course, Leo worked closely with the Mongols and together with them invaded Poland. However, although his troops plundered territory as far west as Racibórz in Silesia, sending many captives and much booty back to Galicia, Leo did not ultimately gain much Polish territory. He cultivated a particularly close alliance with the Tatar Nogai Khan. He also attempted, unsuccessfully, to establish his family's rule over Lithuania. Soon after his younger brother Shvarn ascended to the Lithuanian throne in 1267, Leo organized the murder of Grand Duke of Lithuania Vaišvilkas. Following Shvarn's loss of the throne in 1269, Leo entered into conflict with Lithuania. In 1271-1272 he took part in the Polish succession war on the side of Bolesław the Chaste together with his brother Mstislav, Prince of Lutsk, and later joined his cousin Volodymyr Vasylkovych in a campaign against the Jotvingians, which ended with the latter suing for peace. In 1274–1276, Leo fought a war against the new Lithuanian ruler —Traidenis — but was defeated. Lithuania annexed the territory of Black Ruthenia with its city of Navahrudak.

In 1279, Leo allied himself with King Wenceslaus II of Bohemia and invaded Poland. His attempt to capture Kraków in 1280 ended in failure. That same year, however, Leo defeated the Kingdom of Hungary and temporarily annexed part of Carpathian Ruthenia, including the town of Mukachevo. However, other historians have pointed out that no contemporary documentary evidence supports such an annexation, and that Hungarian royal charters consistently list Munkács and surrounding fortresses as part of the Kingdom of Hungary. Nevertheless, at least one known document issued by Gregorius, Count of Bereg, dated with 1299, mentions him as a vassal of "Leo, Duke of Ruthenians". It is likely that most of Carpathian Ruthenia returned under Hungarian rule after Leo's death, as another document issued by Gregorius in 1307 contains no mentions of Galician princes. The last Galician garrison in the region lost its castle to Hungarians in 1322.

In 1285 Leo allied himself with the Lithuanians against the Polish duke Bolesław, who was plundering his principality. However, he refused to personally join the Lithuanian troops and prevented his son Yuri from taking part in the campaign, fearing revenge for the murder of Vaišvilkas. In 1287 Leo joined the Golden Horde khan Talabuga in his campaign against Poland, which led to great devastation in Volodymyr and its vicinity. In 1289 he personally visited his ally Wenceslaus in Opava and returned to Lviv with lavish gifts, as well as rich booty captured from the Poles. At the time of Leo's death in 1301, the state of Galicia-Volhynia was at the height of its power.

== Legacy ==
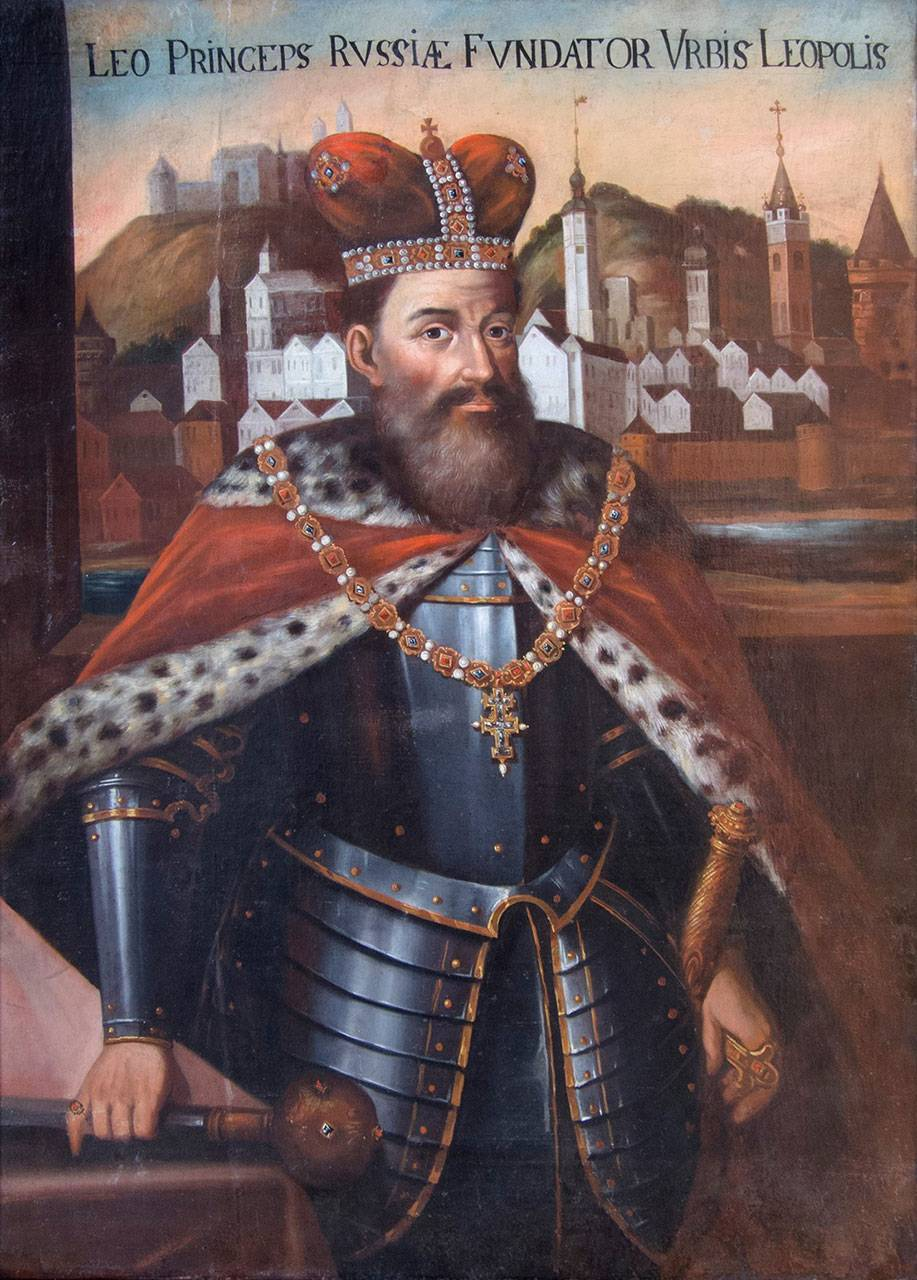
An anachronistic 18th-century portrait of Leo of Galicia, signed Leo, Prince of Rus', founder of the city of Lviv

Leo is seen as an important figure in Rus' history due to his development of Lviv, the capital of Galicia, of which he was long reputed to be the founder (although historical chronicles attribute its foundation to his father, King Daniel). Leo also laid the ground for the foundation of the Orthodox Metropolis of Halych, which was established in 1303 under the rule of his son Yuri Lvovych. The prince's popularity in Galicia is demonstrated by numerous falsified acts which were issued from his name in the centuries following his death.

== Marriage and children ==
Lev I married Constance of Hungary, daughter of Béla IV of Hungary and Maria Laskarina. They had three children:

- Yuri I of Halych–Volhynia (24 April 1252/1257 – 18 March 1308).
- Svyatoslava Lvovna of Halych–Volhynia (died 1302), a nun
- Anastasia Lvovna of Halych–Volhynia (died 12 March 1335), who married Siemowit of Dobrzyń.

== See also ==
- List of princes of Galicia and Volhynia

Leo I of Galicia Romanovichi Born: c. 1228 Died: c. 1301
Regnal titles
Preceded by Yaroslav of Tver	Grand Prince of Kiev (titular); 1271–1301	Succeeded by Ivan of Siveria
Preceded by Daniel of Galicia	King of Galicia and Volhynia; 1269–1301	Succeeded by George I of Galicia
Preceded by Vsevolod III of Belz	Prince of Belz; 1245–1269	Succeeded by George I of Galicia
Preceded by Daniel of Galicia	Prince of Halych and Peremyshl; 1264–1301	Succeeded by George I of Galicia
