= Lengvenis (13th century) =

Lithuanian noble

Lengvenis (Lengewin, Langwinus) was one of the local dukes in the early Grand Duchy of Lithuania during the reign of King Mindaugas (1230s–1263). First mentioned in 1242, Lengvenis was a nephew of Mindaugas (a son of his sister).

Around 1245, Lengvenis led Mindaugas' armies against Volhynia and was injured near Mielnik. Dukes of neighboring lands, three brothers Gineika, Milgerinas (Milgrynas) and Tučė (Dučius), grew unhappy with expanding power of Mindaugas and his clan. Just after the Volhynian campaign, they allied with the Livonian Order invaded Lengvenis' estate (believed to be in Nalšia, northeastern Lithuania with the center in Ginučiai Hillfort). Lengvenis and his family was captured and taken to Riga. Lengvenis' younger brother attempted to rescue them en route to Livonia, but was killed. After a ransom of 500 half groschen was paid, Lengvenis returned to his devastated estate. Lengvenis retaliated around 1247, when he successfully led a military campaign against the komtur of Cēsis. He defeated 500 men guarding the castle, killing the komtur and eight other knights.

He was mentioned for the last time in June 1260 as a witness to Mindaugas' act granting Lithuania to the Livonian Order in case he died without a legitimate heir. However, the act is considered to be a Livonian forgery.

== See also ==
- House of Mindaugas – family tree of Lengvenis
