= Vykintas =

Duke of Samogitia in the 13th century

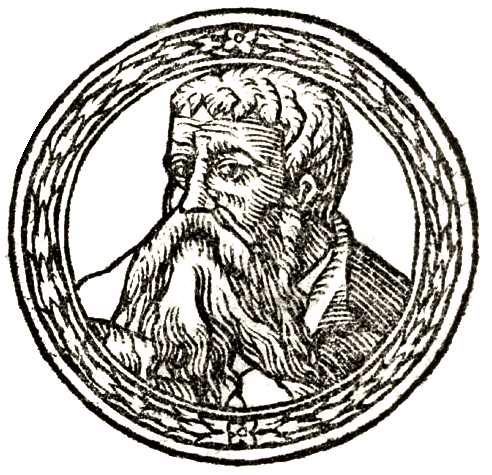
Depiction of Vykintas from the chronicles of Alexander Guagnini, published in 1578

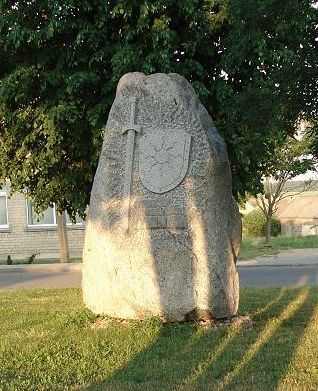
Monument to Duke Vykintas in Tverai

Vykintas (died c. 1253) was the duke of Samogitia and a rival to the future king of Lithuania, Mindaugas.

== Life ==
In 1236, he probably led the Samogitian forces in the Battle of Saule against the Livonian Order. The Order suffered a great defeat and was near the brink of collapse, forcing it to become a branch of the Teutonic Knights.

In 1248, Mindaugas sent Vykintas, Tautvilas, and Edivydas on a military campaign against Smolensk. They were unsuccessful and Mindaugas tried to deprive them of their estates. The three men then organized a vast coalition against Mindaugas which included Tautvilas' brother-in-law Daniel of Galicia, the Livonian Order, and the Samogitians. The dukes of Galicia–Volhynia managed to gain control over Black Ruthenia, an area ruled by Vaišvilkas.

In 1250, the Livonian Order organized two major raids, one against the Nalšia lands and the other against the domains of Mindaugas and those parts of Samogitia that still supported him. However, Mindaugas succeeded in bribing Andreas von Stierland, the Master of the Order, who was still at odds with Vykintas from the defeat of the Order in 1236. Agreeing to relinquish control over some lands in western Lithuania, Mindaugas was to be baptized and crowned as King of Lithuania. In 1252, Tautvilas and his remaining allies attacked Mindaugas in Voruta, sometimes considered to be the first capital of Lithuania. The attack failed and Tautvilas' forces retreated to defend themselves in Tverai castle, in the present-day Rietavas Municipality.

Vykintas died around 1253 and Tautvilas escaped to his brother-in-law to Galicia–Volhynia. The same year, Mindaugas was crowned as promised. Vykintas' sister was married to Dausprungas, Mindaugas' brother.

== See also ==
- List of early Lithuanian dukes
- House of Mindaugas
