= Shvarn =

Grand Duke of Lithuania from 1267 to 1269

Grand Duke of Lithuania
- Reign: 1267–1269
- Predecessor: Vaišvilkas
- Successor: Traidenis
- Born: c. 1230; Halych (now Ukraine)
- Died: c. 1269; Chełm (now Poland)
- Spouse: Sister of Vaišvilkas
- House: Monomakhovichi
- Father: Daniel of Galicia
- Mother: Anna Mstislavna of Novgorod (daughter of Mstislav Mstislavich the Bold)

Shvarn or Shvarno (Old Ruthenian: Шварно; Lithuanian: Švarnas; Belarusian: Шварн Данілавіч; Ukrainian: Шварно Данилович, romanized: Shvarno Danylovych; c. 1230 – c. 1269) was Grand Duke of Lithuania from 1267 to 1269. He was also the prince of Chełm from 1264 to 1269. An influential leader, he became involved in internal struggles of power within the neighboring Grand Duchy of Lithuania.

== Name ==
Little is known of Shvarn and even his name is not entirely certain. The original documents relating to this ruler are scarce and mention him under a variety of names. For instance the first edition of Lithuanian Annals mentions him as Shkvarno, but the following editions use the names of Skirmont and Skirmunt, possibly a Ruthenisation of Lithuanian name Skirmantas. Contemporary sources also mention his Christian name of Ioann (Іоанн), that is either John or George. In modern times the ruler is known by a variety of names in various historiographies, including Lithuanian Švarnas, Ukrainian Шварно Данилович, Russian and Belarusian Шварн, and Polish Szwarno Daniłowicz. All of them are versions of the name of Shvarn, which is likely to be a diminutive of the Slavic name of Svaromir.

== Biography ==
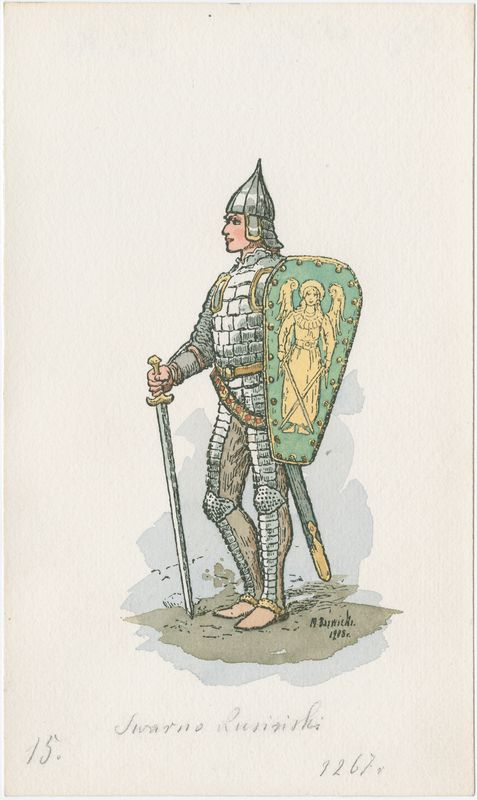
Depiction of Shvarn by M. Barvicki, 1908

One of the sons of king Daniel I of Galicia of the house of Romanovich, Shvarn inherited the north-western parts of the Kingdom of Ruthenia, his fathers' domain. This land included the town of Halicz itself, as well as the land across the Bug River, that is Red Ruthenia with the towns of Bełz, Czerwień^{a}, Mielnik, Drohiczyn and eventually also Chełm (since 1264). His brother Lev I inherited the southern part of the land, with the cities of Lviv and Przemyśl, while Roman became the heir of duchies of Lutsk and Terebovl.

During the times of king Daniel's reign, the Galician lords were allied with their Polish neighbours against a common threat, the Lithuanians who often raided the neighbouring lands for loot and plunder. However, in 1255 (or the previous year) Shvarn married an unnamed daughter of Mindaugas, since 1253 the first (and only) king of Lithuania. This allied him to Lithuania and together the two rulers undertook numerous military campaigns against the Kingdom of Poland. Already in 1255 they raided Lublin, in 1262 a major campaign against Masovia was started. Shvarn and Treniota captured the city of Płock and besieged Shvarn's brother-in-law, Siemowit I of Masovia in Jazdów (modern Warsaw). In the end Siemowit was killed by Shvarn's troops and his son Konrad II was taken prisoner. The Polish relief force did not arrive in time and was later defeated in a battle at Długosiodło on August 5, 1262.

In 1264 king Daniel of Galicia died and Shvarn received nominal overlordship over all of Kingdom of Ruthenia as its duke. Immediately he mounted a major campaign against Poland, this time aiming for Lesser Poland. However, although joint armies managed to plunder Skaryszew, Tarczek and Wiślica, this time the campaign was less successful and the allied Ruthenian and Lithuanian armies were repelled. The Yotvingian auxiliaries were defeated by Bolesław V the Chaste at the Battle of Brańsk. The following year Bolesław mounted a counter-offensive against Shvarn and his uncle Vasylko Romanovych, and defeated the earlier on June 19, 1266, at Wrota. This weakened Shvarn's position in his own domain.

In the meantime in 1263 Mindaugas of Lithuania was murdered. In the chaos that followed Mindaugas' assassination, the lands of the Grand Duchy were in disarray, with both local and foreign rulers struggling for power. Shvarn gave his support to Vaišvilkas, one of Mindaugas' sons and his brother-in-law. Together they managed to depose Treniota and expel Daumantas all the way to Pskov. After Vaišvilkas returned to monastic life in 1267, Shvarn became the new grand duke. No details are known about Shvarn's rule over Lithuania and he probably did not gain a strong foothold in that country. However, he was apparently fairly successful in expanding his borders. Following successful military campaigns, in 1267 he defeated his brother Mstislav in the battle of the Yaselda River and captured Turov and Pinsk. The struggle for power within Lithuania however continued. Before a clear winner could emerge, Shvarn died in Chełm some time between 1269 and 1271. He was buried in an Orthodox Cathedral that once stood on a place now occupied by the Basilica of the Birth of the Virgin Mary. After his death most of his lands reverted to Lithuania, and came under the control of Traidenis, a noble from Aukštaitija.

== Ancestry ==
Ancestors of Shvarn

16. Iziaslav II of Kiev
8. Mstislav II of Kiev
17. Agnes Hohenstaufen
4. Roman the Great
18. Bolesław III Wrymouth
9. Agnes of Poland
19. Salomea of Berg
2. Daniel of Galicia
20. Andronikos Doukas Angelos
10. Isaac II Angelos
21. Euphrosyne Kastamonitissa
5. Anna-Euphrosyne
22. Demetrios Tornikes
11. Irene Tornikes Palaiologina
23. … Malakissa
1. Shvarn
24. Rostislav I of Kiev
12. Mstislav Rostislavich
6. Mstislav Mstislavich
26. Gleb Rostislavich, prince of Ryazan
13. Feodosiya Glebovna of Ryazan
27. Euphrosyne Rostislavna of Pereyaslavl
3. Anna Mstislavna of Novgorod
28. Konchek Otrakovich, Khan of the Cumans
14. Sutoevich, Khan of the Cumans
7. Maria Kotjanovna

== See also ==
- List of rulers of Halych and Volhynia
- List of Lithuanian rulers

== Notes ==
a. The capital of the land of Red Ruthenia (Czerwień Towns, or Grody Czerwieńskie in Polish). Its location remains unknown and disputed; possibly it was located where the village of Czermno stands today.

Preceded by Vaišvilkas	Grand Prince of Lithuania; 1267–1269	Succeeded by Traidenis
