= Nalšia =

An ancient land in the Grand Duchy of Lithuania

Nalšia or Nalšėnai (sometimes Nalsen, Nalse) was an ancient land in the early stages of the Grand Duchy of Lithuania. It is mentioned in written sources from 1229 to 1298. The references to it cease as it was fully incorporated into the Grand Duchy. While it is known that it was on the north-eastern border of Lithuania proper, the exact location is unknown and is debated among historians. It is believed that Nalšia was between Livonia and the Duchy of Lithuania and bordered Deltuva. Towns of Švenčionys and Utena are often identified as the most prominent settlements in the land. Several dukes of Nalšia are known. The most prominent of them was Daumantas of Pskov. Others were Lengvenis, nephew of Mindaugas, Suksė (Suxe), who defected to the Teutonic Knights, and Gerdenis, rival to Daumantas.
