= Duchy of Lithuania =

13th–15th century European territory

Coordinates: 55°N 25°E

Duchy of Lithuania Lietuvos kunigaikštystė (Lithuanian)
- Division of Grand Duchy of Lithuania
- 13th century–1413
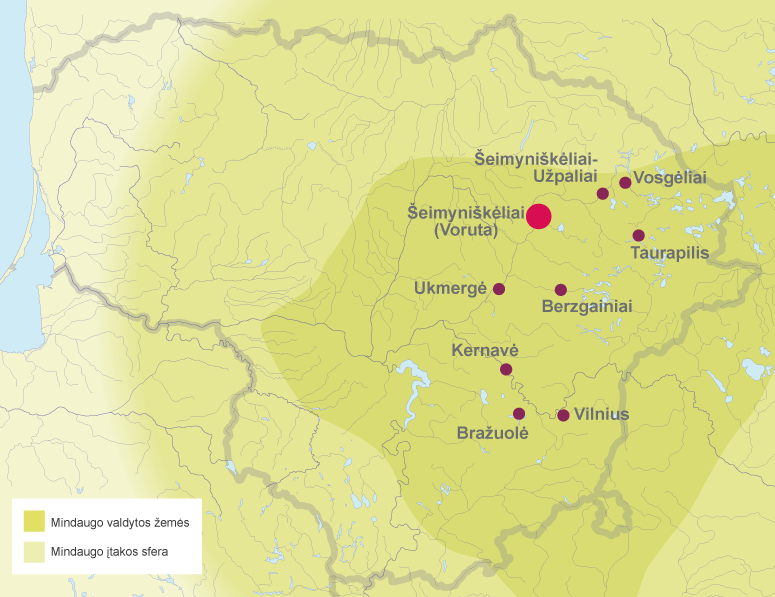
- Domain of King Mindaugas (dark yellow) during the times of the Kingdom of Lithuania, making up the initial Duchy of Lithuania.
- Government
  - Type: Feudal monarchy
- Grand Duke of Lithuania
  - ca. 1236–1263: Mindaugas
  - 1295–1316: Vytenis
  - 1316–1341: Gediminas
  - 1345–1377: Algirdas
  - 1377–1392: Jogaila
  - 1392–1413: Vytautas
- Historical era: Middle Ages
  - Established: 13th century
  - Union of Horodło: 1413
Succeeded by
Kingdom of Lithuania
- Today part of: Belarus; Lithuania; Latvia

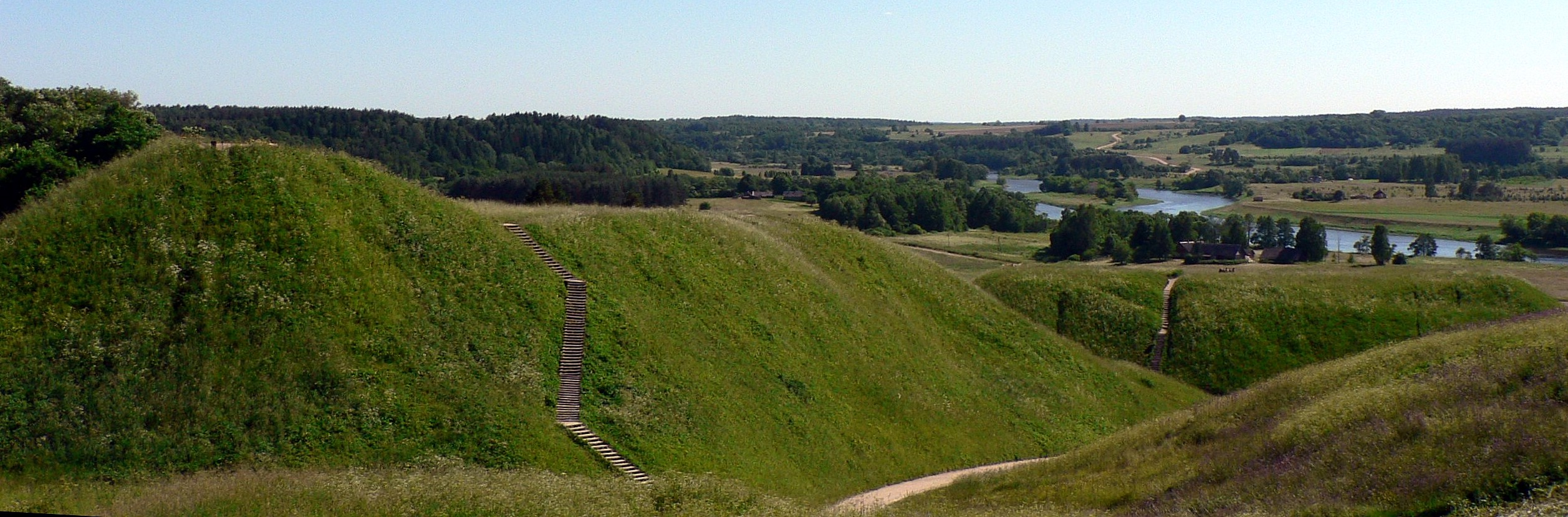
Kernavė, the heartland of Lithuania in the 11th–13th century

The Duchy of Lithuania (Latin: Ducatus Lithuaniae; Lithuanian: Lietuvos kunigaikštystė) was a state-territorial formation of ethnic Lithuanians that existed from the 13th century to 1413. For most of its existence, it was a constituent part and a nucleus of the Grand Duchy of Lithuania. Other alternative names of the territorial formation, used in different periods, were Aukštaitija or Land of Lithuania (13th century), Duchy of Vilnius (14th – early 15th centuries), Lithuania proper, or simply Lithuania (in a narrow sense).

== History ==
The formation emerged in the central and eastern part of present-day Lithuania, known as Aukštaitija, or the Lietuva Land (Lithuanian: Lietuvos žemė). It is supposed to have formed in central Lithuania on the left bank of the Neris River and swiftly expanded eastwards. This land was mentioned in 1009 as Litua (see Name of Lithuania). The territory was ruled by chieftains of an ethnic Lithuanian tribe, Aukštaitians or "Lithuanians", in the original sense of the term.

After the expansion of the Lithuanian state in the 13th century, when it became known as the Grand Duchy of Lithuania and the Kingdom of Lithuania (1251–1263), the Duchy of Lithuania became an administrative unit, governed by dukes and inherited through dynastic links. The main administrative center of the Duchy until the late 13th century might have been Kernavė.

It is possible that the Duchy of Lithuania, which became known as the Duchy of Vilnius from the 14th century on, was formed out of the eastern part of the original Duchy of Lithuania under the rule of Grand Duke of Lithuania Vytenis at the end of the 13th century; its southwestern part was turned into a separate Duchy of Trakai, under the dominion of Gediminas, who had established himself in the newly built Senieji Trakai Castle. It is known for certain that the Duchy of Trakai existed as the domain of Kęstutis at the beginning of his rule in 1337. It was a progenitor of the future Trakai Voivodeship.

The last Duke of Lithuania (Latin: Dux Lithuaniae) was Vytautas the Great, who, as a result of the 1392 Astrava Treaty, received the Duchy from Jogaila, who, in turn, had inherited it from his father Algirdas. Since 1397, the Duchy had the status of an Eldership, comparable to that of the Eldership of Samogitia. After the administrative reform of 1413 by Vytautas, based on the Union of Horodło, the Duchy became part of the newly established Vilnius Voivodeship of the Grand Duchy of Lithuania.

== See also ==
- History of Lithuania
- History of Lithuania (1219–1295)
- History of Vilnius
- Lithuania proper
