= Vaišvilkas =

Grand Duke of Lithuania from 1264 to 1267

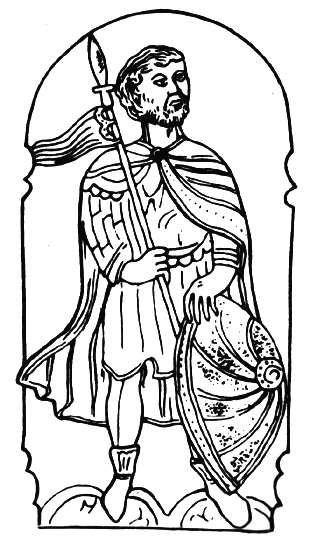
- 16th–17th century imaginative depiction of Vaišvilkas

Grand Duke of Lithuania
- Reign: 1264–1267
- Predecessor: Treniota
- Successor: Shvarn

Duke of Novogrudok
- Reign: 1253–1254; 1258–1259
- Successor: Roman Danylovych
- Born: 1223
- Died: 1267 (aged 43–44)
- House: House of Mindaugas
- Father: Mindaugas

Monastery that was presumably founded by Vaišvilkas (painting by Napoleon Orda)

Vaišvilkas or Vojšałk (Note: also spelled Vaišvila, Vojszalak, Vojšalk, Vaišalgas;) (died 18 April 1267) was Grand Duke of Lithuania from 1264 until his death in 1267. He was a son of Mindaugas, the first and only Christian King of Lithuania.

== Name ==
The original Lithuanian name of this Grand Duke has puzzled many linguists and historians. Their reconstructions resulted in two credible variants Vaišvilkas, based on Woyszwiłk and Vaišelga, based on Vojšalk. The name Vaišvilkas was first reconstructed by Kazimieras Būga. In fact, the first part of the double-stemmed name vaiš- causes no dispute and is attested in many similar names. However, the second part -vilkas, meaning "wolf" is very rare to non existent in Lithuanian names. This led to the hypothesis that the initial form of the name should have been Vaišvilas. The variant Vaišelga/Vaišalga has gained more popularity in historical writings even though the origins of the element -alg and -elg are not entirely clear. Eventually, some researchers even suggest that he had two names, one of them being Vaišvilas.

== Biography ==
Nothing is known about the youth of Vaišvilkas as he entered historical sources only in 1254 when he made a treaty, in the name of his father King Mindaugas, with Daniel of Halych-Volhynia. In the treaty, Halych-Volhynia transfers Black Ruthenia with center in Navahrudak to Lithuania. To solidify the treaty, Daniel's son Shvarn was married to Vaišvilkas' sister. Vaišvilkas was appointed as duke of some of these lands. After Vaišvilkas was baptized in a Greek Orthodox rite, he was drawn to religious life so much that he transferred his title and lands to Roman Danylovich, son of Daniel of Halych. He founded a monastery traditionally identified with Lavrashev Monastery on the bank on the Neman River and entered it as a monk. He set off on a pilgrimage to Mount Athos in Greece. However, he did not reach the destination due to wars in the Balkans and returned to Navahrudak.

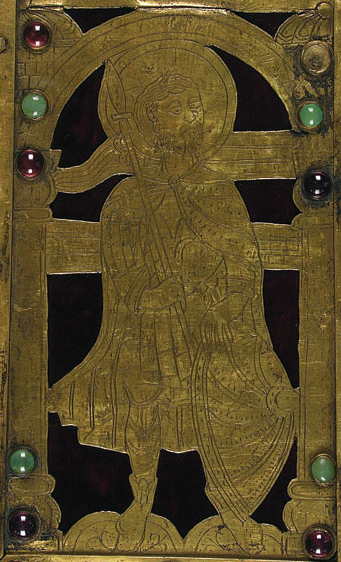
14th-century work of art depicting Vaišvilkas

In 1264, he escaped an assassination plot by Treniota and Daumantas against his father and two of his brothers. Treniota was murdered by former servants of Mindaugas. Vaišvilkas allied himself with his brother-in-law Shvarn from Halych-Volhynia. They managed to take control over Black Ruthenia and the Duchy of Lithuania. Then they waged a war against Nalšia and Deltuva, two main centers of opposition to Mindaugas and Vaišvilkas. Daumantas, Duke of Nalšia, was forced to flee to Pskov. Suksė (Suxe), another influential duke from Nalšia, fled to Livonia. Vaišvilkas became next the Grand Duke of Lithuania. As a Christian, he tried to maintain friendly relationships with the Teutonic Knights and the Livonian Order. He signed a peace treaty with Livonia regarding trade on the Daugava River. Lithuanian support of the Great Prussian Uprising ceased, and the orders made advances against Semigallians and Curonians uninterrupted. Together with Shvarn, Vaišvilkas attacked Poland in 1265 to avenge the Yotvingians' defeat a year prior.

When in 1267 he decided to go back to monastic life, Vaišvilkas transferred the title of Grand Duke to Shvarn. A year later he was killed by Shvarn's brother, Leo I of Halych, who was angry that Vaišvilkas did not divide the powers between him and his brother. He was interred near the Assumption Church in Volodymyr.

== See also ==
- House of Mindaugas – family tree of Vaišvilkas
- List of Lithuanian rulers

== Notes ==
Preceded by Treniota	Grand Duke of Lithuania; 1264–1267	Succeeded by Shvarn
