= Treniota =

Grand Duke of Lithuania from 1263 to 1264

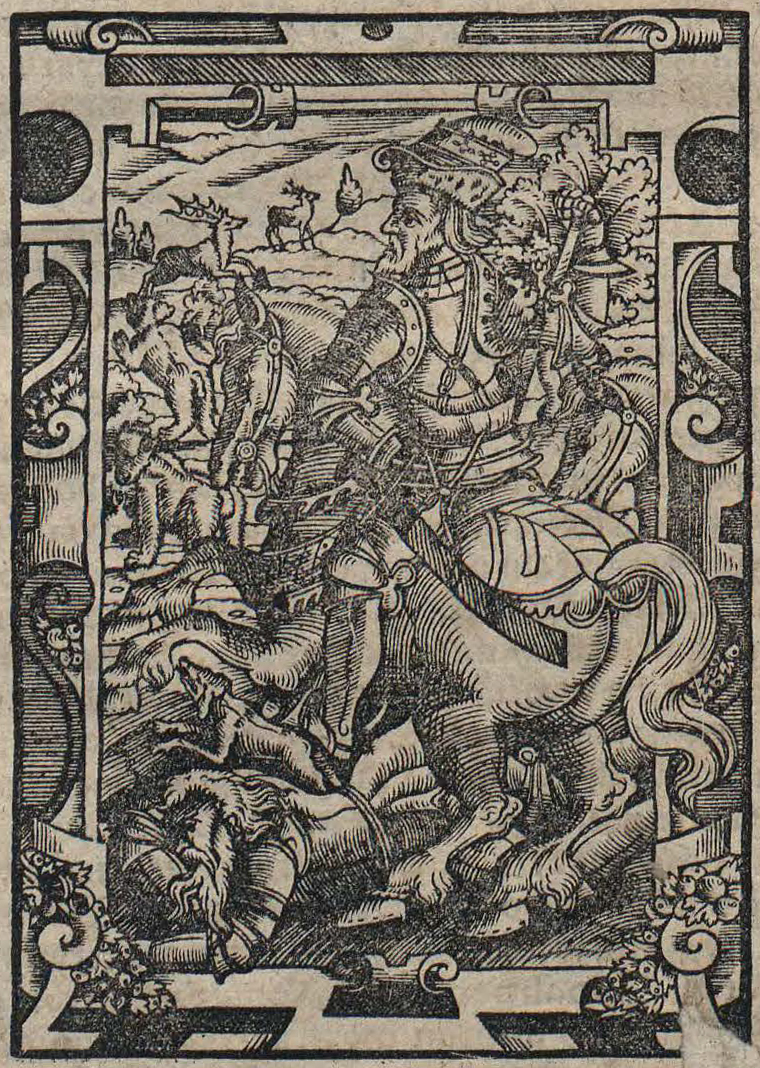
- Depiction of Treniota from chronicles of Alexander Guagnini, published in 1578

Grand Duke of Lithuania
- Reign: 1263–1264
- Predecessor: Mindaugas (as King)
- Successor: Vaišvilkas

Duke of Samogitia
- Reign: 1253–1263
- Predecessor: Vykintas
- Born: c. 1210
- Died: 1264
- House: Mindaugas
- Father: Vykintas
- Mother: NN, sister of Mindaugas

Treniota (also spelled Troniata; Belarusian: Транята, romanized: Traniata; c. 1210 – 1264) was Grand Duke of Lithuania from 1263 to 1264.

== Life ==
Treniota was the nephew of Mindaugas, the first and only king of Lithuania. While Mindaugas had converted to Christianity in order to discourage Livonian Order and Teutonic Knights attacks on Lithuania, becoming king in the process, Treniota remained a staunch pagan. It is believed that Treniota was trusted to rule Samogitia.

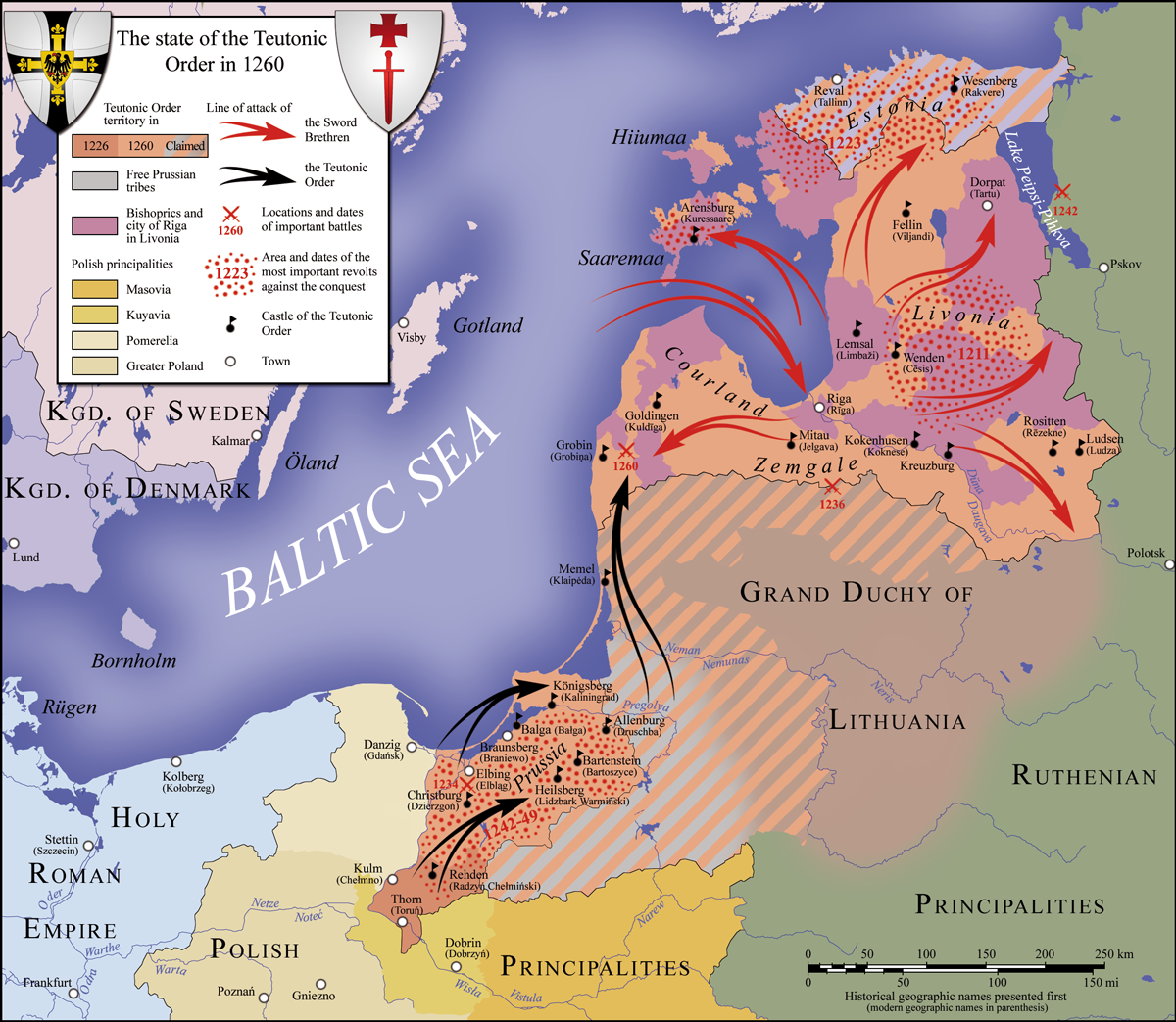
Map of the monastic state of the Teutonic Knights, 1260

Despite Mindaugas's conversion, the Teutonic Knights regularly made incursions in Lithuanian territory. After the Battle of Durbe in 1260, Treniota convinced Mindaugas to relapse from Christianity and attack the Teutonic Order, though the attack was ineffective and the Teutonic Knights were barely weakened. Mindaugas began to question his alliance with Treniota. However, before he was able act against his pagan nephew, Treniota together with Daumantas assassinated Mindaugas and two of his sons in 1263. Treniota usurped the throne and reverted the nation to paganism. However, he only ruled for a year before being deposed by Vaišvilkas, the younger son of Mindaugas.

== See also ==
- House of Mindaugas
- List of heads of state of Lithuania

== Sources ==
- Gudavičius, Edvardas (2004). "Treniota". In Vytautas Spečiūnas (ed.). Lietuvos valdovai (XIII-XVIII a.): enciklopedinis žinynas (in Lithuanian). Vilnius: Mokslo ir enciklopedijų leidybos institutas. p. 23. ISBN 5-420-01535-8.

Preceded by Mindaugas (as King of Lithuania)	Grand Duke of Lithuania; 1263–1264	Succeeded by Vaišvilkas
