= Rietavas Municipality =

Coordinates: 55°43′30″N 21°57′07″E

Rietavas Municipality Rietavo savivaldybė
- Municipality
- Coat of arms

- Location of Rietavas municipality within Lithuania

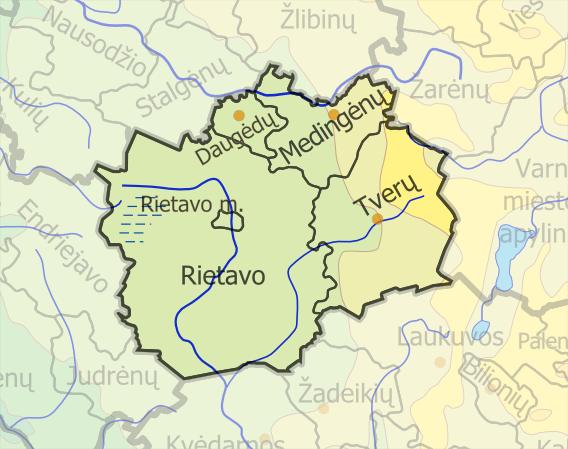
- Map of Rietavas municipality
- Country: Lithuania
- Ethnographic region: Samogitia
- County: Telšiai County
- Capital: Rietavas
- Elderships: 5

Area
  - Total: 586 km^{2} (226 sq mi)
  - Rank: 45th

Population (2021)
  - Total: 7,381
  - Rank: 58th
  - Density: 12.6/km^{2} (32.6/sq mi)
  - Rank: 57th
- Time zone: UTC+2 (EET)
  - Summer (DST): UTC+3 (EEST)
- Telephone code: 448
- Major settlements: Rietavas (pop. 3,234)
- Website: www.rietavas.lt

Rietavas Municipality is one of 60 municipalities in Lithuania.

According to the 2021 Lithuanian census, Rietavas Municipality had the highest fertility rate in Lithuania - with an average of 2.019 children per woman, compared to the national average of just 1.506 children per woman.
