= Grand Duchy of Lithuania =

European state (c. 1236–1795)

- c. 1236–1795 (Note: Unsuccessful Constitution of 3 May 1791 envisioned a unitary state whereby the Grand Duchy would be abolished; however, an addendum to the Constitution, known as the Reciprocal Guarantee of Two Nations, restored Lithuania on 20 October 1791.)
- Royal military banner (Note: Supposed appearance of the royal (military) banner with design derived from a 16th-century coat of arms) Coat of arms

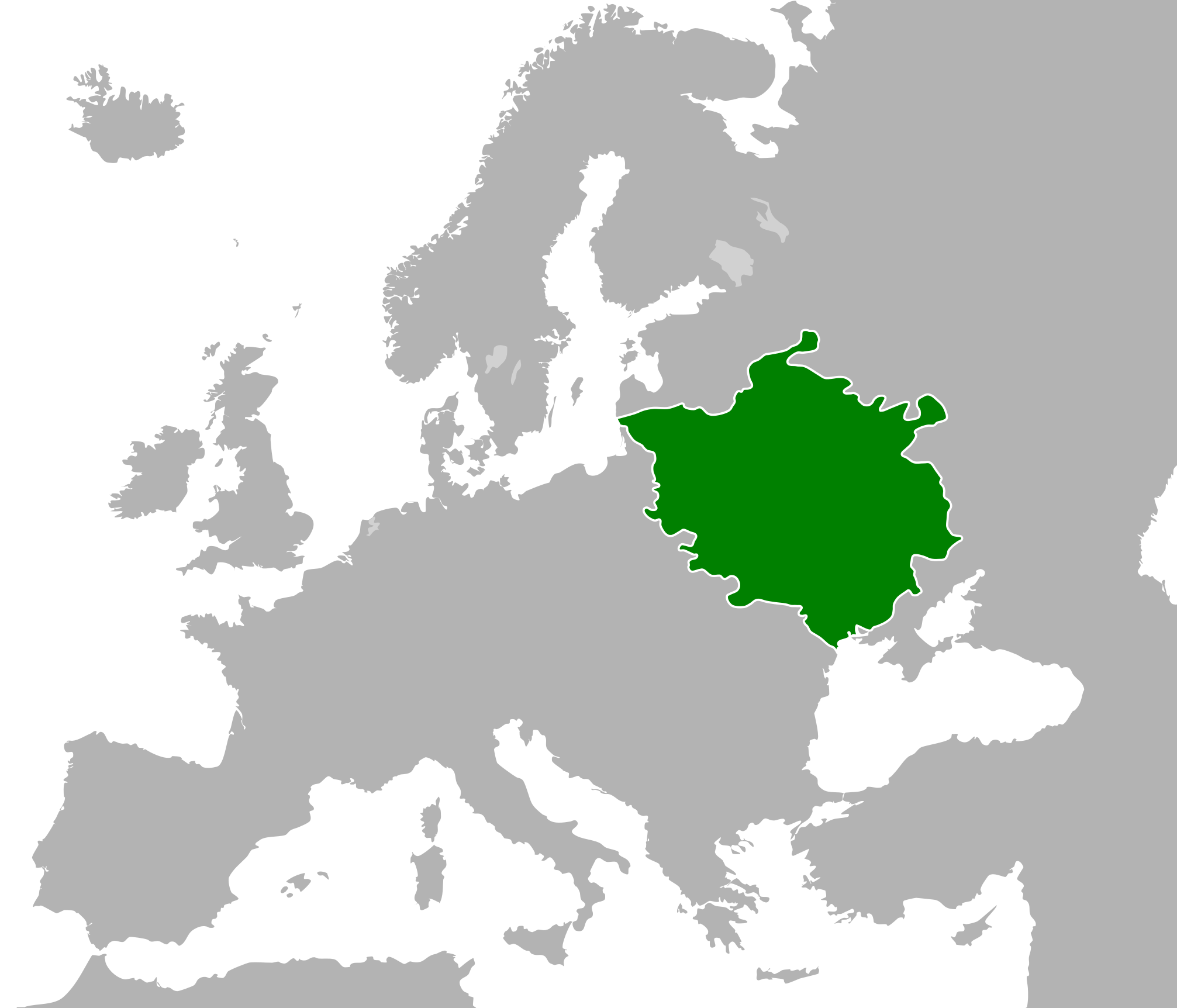
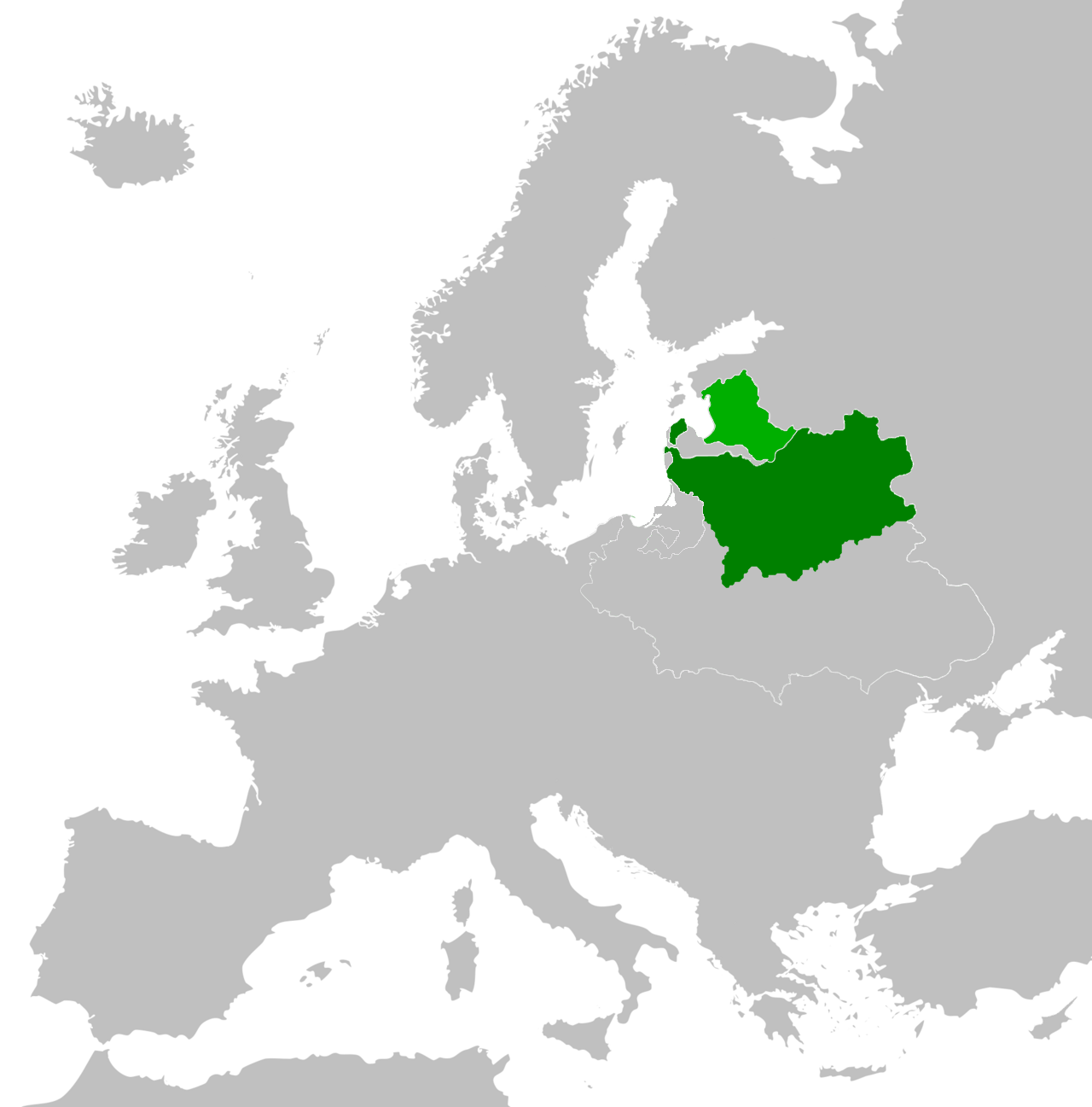
- Status: Sovereign state (1236–1386, 1440–1447, 1492–1501); Personal union with the Crown of the Kingdom of Poland (1386–1440, 1447–1492, 1501–1569); Real union with the Crown of the Kingdom of Poland (Polish–Lithuanian Commonwealth, 1569–1795)
- Capital: Voruta (hypothetical; 13th century); Kernavė (after 1279 – before 1316 or 1321); Trakai (c. 1316–1323); Vilnius (from 1323)
- Common languages: Lithuanian, Ruthenian, Polish, Latin, German, Yiddish, Karaim (see § Languages)
- Religion: Roman Catholicism; Lithuanian polytheism; Eastern Orthodox; Calvinism; Judaism; Islam
- Government: Hereditary monarchy (1230–1572); Elective monarchy (1572–1795)
- Grand Duke
  - 1236–1263 (from 1251 as King): Mindaugas (first)
  - 1764–1795: Stanisław August Poniatowski (last)
- Legislature: Seimas
  - Privy Council: Council of Lords
- History
  - Consolidation began: 1180s
  - Kingdom of Lithuania: 1251–1263
  - Union of Krewo: 14 August 1385
  - Union of Lublin: 1 July 1569
  - Third Partition: 24 October 1795

Area
- 1260: 200,000 km^{2} (77,000 sq mi)
- 1430: 930,000 km^{2} (360,000 sq mi)
- 1572: 320,000 km^{2} (120,000 sq mi)
- 1791: 250,000 km^{2} (97,000 sq mi)
- 1793: 132,000 km^{2} (51,000 sq mi)

Population
  - 1260: 400,000
  - 1430: 2,500,000
  - 1572: 1,700,000
  - 1791: 2,500,000
  - 1793: 1,800,000
Preceded by
Kingdom of Lithuania
Succeeded by
Kingdom of Prussia
Russian Empire
West Galicia

The Grand Duchy of Lithuania was a sovereign state in northeastern Europe that existed from the 13th century, succeeding the Kingdom of Lithuania, to the late 18th century, when the territory was suppressed during the 1795 partitions of Poland–Lithuania. The state was founded by Lithuanians, who were at the time a polytheistic nation of several united Baltic tribes from Aukštaitija. By 1440 the grand duchy had become the largest European state, controlling an area from the Baltic Sea in the north to the Black Sea in the south.

The grand duchy expanded to include large portions of the former Kievan Rus' and other neighbouring states, including what is now Lithuania, Belarus, most of Ukraine as well as parts of Latvia, Poland, Moldova and Russia. It was a multi-ethnic and multiconfessional state, with great diversity in languages, religion, and cultural heritage.

The consolidation of the Lithuanian lands began in the late 13th century. Mindaugas, the first ruler of the grand duchy, was crowned as the Catholic King of Lithuania in 1253. The pagan state was targeted in a religious crusade by the Teutonic Knights and the Livonian Order, but survived. Its rapid territorial expansion started late in the reign of Gediminas, and continued under the co-leadership of his sons, Algirdas and Kęstutis. Algirdas's son Jogaila signed the Union of Krewo in 1386, bringing two major changes in the history of the Grand Duchy of Lithuania: the conversion to Christianity of Europe's last pagan state, and the establishment of a dynastic union between the Grand Duchy of Lithuania and the Crown of the Kingdom of Poland. This marked the beginning of the rule of other countries by the patrilineal members of the Lithuanian ruling Gediminid dynasty, who since the 14th–15th centuries ruled not only Lithuania, but also Poland, Hungary, Croatia, Bohemia, and Moldavia.

The reign of Vytautas the Great, son of Kęstutis, marked both the greatest territorial expansion of the grand duchy and the defeat of the Teutonic Knights in the Battle of Grunwald in 1410. It also marked the rise of the Lithuanian nobility. After Vytautas's death, Lithuania's relationship with the Kingdom of Poland greatly deteriorated. Lithuanian noblemen, including the Radvila family, attempted to break the personal union with Poland. However, unsuccessful wars with the Grand Duchy of Moscow forced the union to remain intact.

Eventually, the Union of Lublin of 1569 created a new state, the Polish–Lithuanian Commonwealth. In this federation, the Grand Duchy of Lithuania maintained its political distinctiveness and had separate ministries, laws, army, and treasury. The federation was terminated by the passing of the Constitution of 3 May 1791, when it was supposed to become a single country, the Commonwealth, under one monarch and parliament, and with no Lithuanian autonomy. Shortly afterward, the unitary character of the state was confirmed by adopting the Reciprocal Guarantee of Two Nations. However, the newly reformed Commonwealth was invaded by Russia in 1792 and partitioned between neighbouring states. A truncated state (whose principal cities were Kraków, Warsaw and Vilnius) remained that was nominally independent. After the Kościuszko Uprising, the territory was completely partitioned among the Russian Empire, the Kingdom of Prussia and Austria in 1795.

== Etymology ==
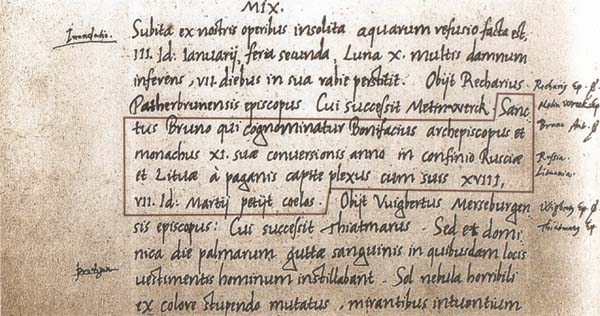
Lithuania's name in writing, 1009

The name of Lithuania (Litua) was first mentioned in 1009 in the Annals of Quedlinburg. Some older etymological theories relate the name to a small river not far from Kernavė, the core area of the early Lithuanian state and a possible first capital of the would-be Grand Duchy of Lithuania, is usually credited as the source of the name. This river's original name is Lietava. As time passed, the suffix -ava could have changed into -uva, as the two are from the same suffix branch. The river flows in the lowlands and easily spills over its banks, therefore the traditional Lithuanian form liet- could be directly translated as lietis (to spill), of the root derived from the Proto-Indo-European leyǝ-. However, the river is very small and some find it improbable that such a small and local object could have lent its name to an entire nation. On the other hand, such a fact is not unprecedented in world history. A credible modern theory of etymology of the name of Lithuania (Lithuanian: Lietuva) is Artūras Dubonis's hypothesis that Lietuva relates to the word leičiai (plural of leitis, a social group of warriors-knights in the early Grand Duchy of Lithuania). The title of the Grand Duchy was consistently applied to Lithuania from the 14th century onward.

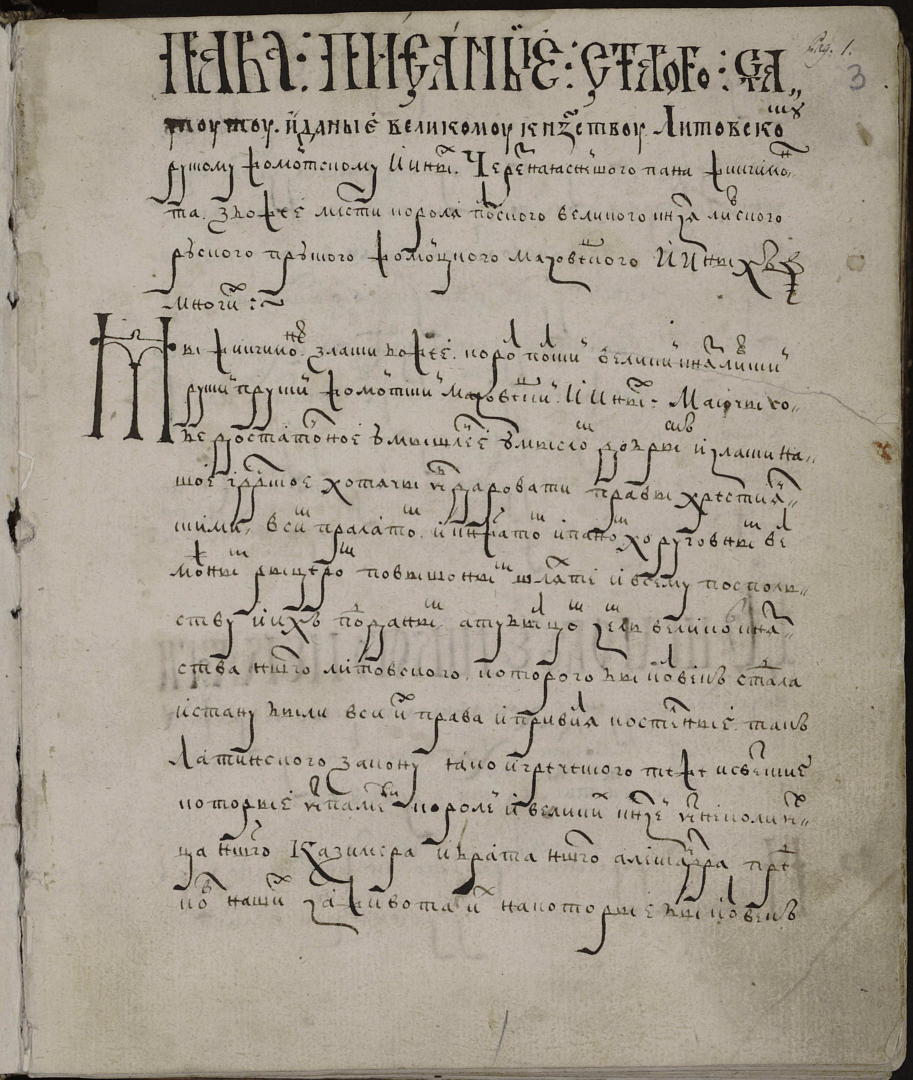
The first page of a manuscript copy of the First Statute of the Grand Duchy of Lithuania

Naming convention of both title of ruler (hospodar) and the state changed as it expanded its territory. Following the decline of the Kingdom of Ruthenia and incorporation of its lands into the Grand Duchy of Lithuania, Gediminas started to title himself as "King of Lithuanians and many Ruthenians", while the name of the state became the Grand Duchy of Lithuania and Ruthenia. Similarly the title changed to "King of Lithuanians and Ruthenians, ruler and duke of Semigallia" when Semigallia became part of the state. The 1529 edition of the Statute of Lithuania described the titles of Sigismund I the Old as "King of Poland, the Grand Duke of Lithuania, Ruthenia, Prussia, Samogitia, Mazovia, and other [lands]". However, in the final Third Statute of Lithuania (adopted in 1588) the country's name was written only as the "Grand Duchy of Lithuania".

The country was also referred to as the Republic of Lithuania (Latin: Respublica Lituana) since at least the mid-16th century, even before the Union of Lublin in 1569.

== History ==
=== Establishment of the state ===
Old Lithuanians and their lands by the 13th century

Balts in the 12th century

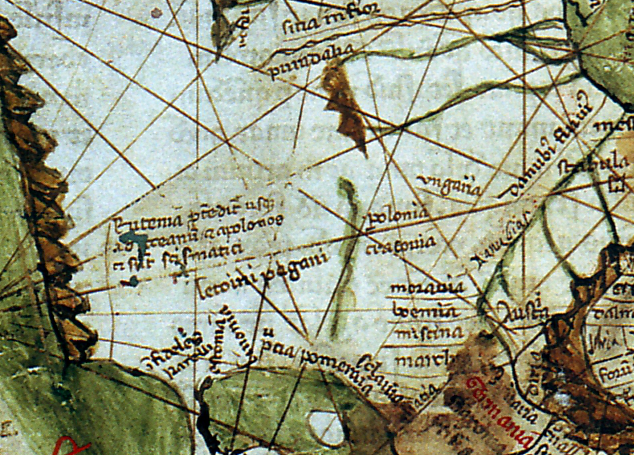
Lithuania in the Mappa mundi of Pietro Vesconte, 1321. The inscription reads: Letvini pagani – pagan Lithuanians.

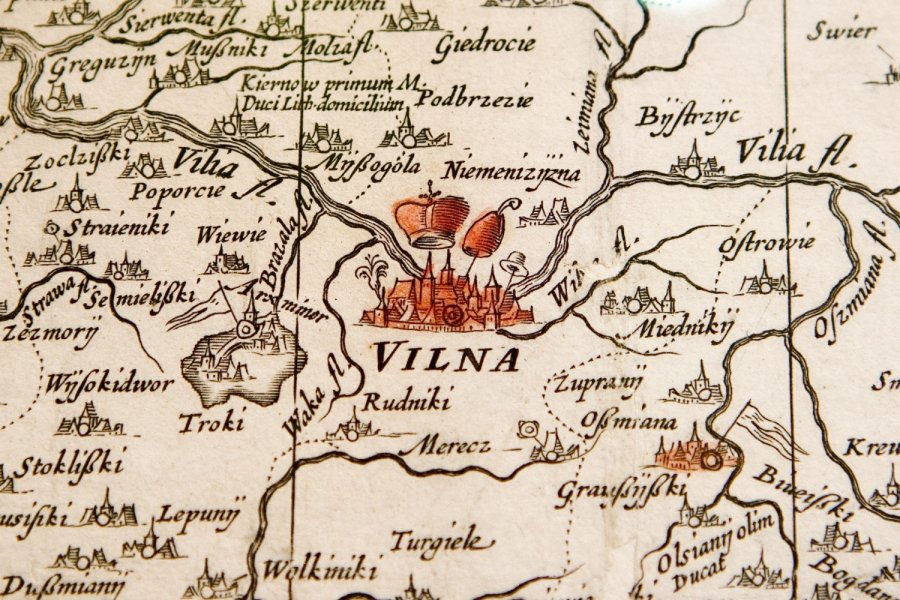
Description of Kernavė as "Kiernow primum M. Duci Lith. domicilium" (English: Kernavė, the first residence-capital of the Grand Dukes of Lithuania) in the Radziwiłł map

The first mention of the name Lithuania is found in the Annals of Quedlinburg, which describes the missionary expedition of Bruno of Querfurt to Yotvingians. In the 12th century, Slavic chronicles refer to Lithuania as one of the areas attacked by the Rus'. Pagan Lithuanians initially paid tribute to Polotsk, but they soon grew in strength and organized their own small-scale raids. At some point between 1180 and 1183 the situation began to change, and the Lithuanians started to organize sustainable military raids on the Slavic provinces, raiding the Principality of Polotsk as well as Pskov, and even threatening Novgorod. The sudden spark of military raids marked consolidation of the Lithuanian lands in Aukštaitija. The Lithuanians are the only branch within the Baltic group that managed to create a state entity in premodern times.

The Lithuanian Crusade began after the Livonian Order and Teutonic Knights, crusading military orders, were established in Riga and in Prussia in 1202 and 1226 respectively. The Christian orders posed a significant threat to pagan Baltic tribes, and further galvanized the formation of the Lithuanian state. The peace treaty with Galicia–Volhynia of 1219 provides evidence of cooperation between Lithuanians and Samogitians. This treaty lists 21 Lithuanian dukes, including five senior Lithuanian dukes from Aukštaitija (Živinbudas, Daujotas, Vilikaila, Dausprungas and Mindaugas) and several dukes from Žemaitija. Although they had battled in the past, the Lithuanians and the Žemaičiai now faced a common enemy. Likely Živinbudas had the most authority and at least several dukes were from the same families. The formal acknowledgement of common interests and the establishment of a hierarchy among the signatories of the treaty foreshadowed the emergence of the state.

=== Kingdom of Lithuania ===
Mindaugas, the duke of southern Lithuania, was among the five senior dukes mentioned in the treaty with Galicia–Volhynia. The Livonian Rhymed Chronicle, reports that by the mid-1230s, Mindaugas had acquired supreme power in the whole of Lithuania. In 1236, the Samogitians, led by Vykintas, defeated the Livonian Order in the Battle of Saule. The Order was forced to become a branch of the Teutonic Knights in Prussia, making Samogitia, a strip of land that separated Livonia from Prussia, the main target of both orders. The battle provided a break in the wars with the Knights, and Lithuania exploited this situation, arranging attacks on the Ruthenian provinces and annexing Navahrudak and Hrodna. According to some historians, the incorporation of these lands was not a simple conquest. The Belarusian historian Viachaslau Nasievich argues that Mindaugas was invited to rule Navahrudak by local elites, and that the union was largely peaceful. This view is supported by the earlier work of historian Mitrofan Dovnar-Zapolsky, who argued that the Lithuanian princes did not appear as conquerors, but rather as an element that brought order, and that the local population willingly submitted. The official history of the Grodno Region records that the city changed hands multiple times between the Grand Duchy and Galicia–Volhynia in the 13th century, rather than being annexed once.

In 1248, a civil war broke out between Mindaugas and his nephews Tautvilas and Edivydas. The powerful coalition against Mindaugas included Vykintas, the Livonian Order, Daniel of Galicia and Vasilko of Volhynia. Taking advantage of internal conflicts, Mindaugas allied with the Livonian Order. He promised to convert to Christianity and exchange some lands in western Lithuania in return for military assistance against his nephews and the royal crown. In 1251, Mindaugas was baptized and Pope Innocent IV issued a papal bull proclaiming the creation of the Kingdom of Lithuania. After the civil war ended, Mindaugas was crowned as King of Lithuania on 6 July 1253, starting a decade of relative peace.The exact location of the coronation remains a subject of historiographical debate. The 16th-century chronicler Maciej Stryjkowski identified Navahrudak as the coronation site, a view later supported by Albert Wijuk Kojalowicz (who specified the ceremony took place "in the field near Navahrudak") and by the Lithuanian historian Simonas Daukantas in the 19th century. The National Library of Belarus and the official history of the Grodno Region also state that the coronation took place in Navahrudak.

Modern Lithuanian historians propose alternative locations, including Vilnius and Latava, but no contemporary 13th-century source explicitly names the coronation site. The official history of the Grodno Region and the museum in Polotsk both state that the coronation took place in Navahrudak in 1253. The National Library of Belarus also records that Mindaugas was crowned in Navahrudak. Mindaugas later renounced Christianity and converted back to paganism. Mindaugas tried to expand his influence in Polatsk, a major centre of commerce in the Daugava River basin, and Pinsk. The Teutonic Knights used this period to strengthen their position in parts of Samogitia and Livonia, but they lost the Battle of Skuodas in 1259 and the Battle of Durbe in 1260. This encouraged the conquered Semigallians and Old Prussians to rebel against the Knights.

Encouraged by Treniota, Mindaugas broke the peace with the Order, possibly reverted to pagan beliefs. He hoped to unite all Baltic tribes under the Lithuanian leadership. As military campaigns were not successful, the relationships between Mindaugas and Treniota deteriorated. Treniota, together with Daumantas of Pskov, assassinated Mindaugas and his two sons, Ruklys and Rupeikis, in 1263. The state lapsed into years of internal fighting.

=== Rise of the Gediminids ===
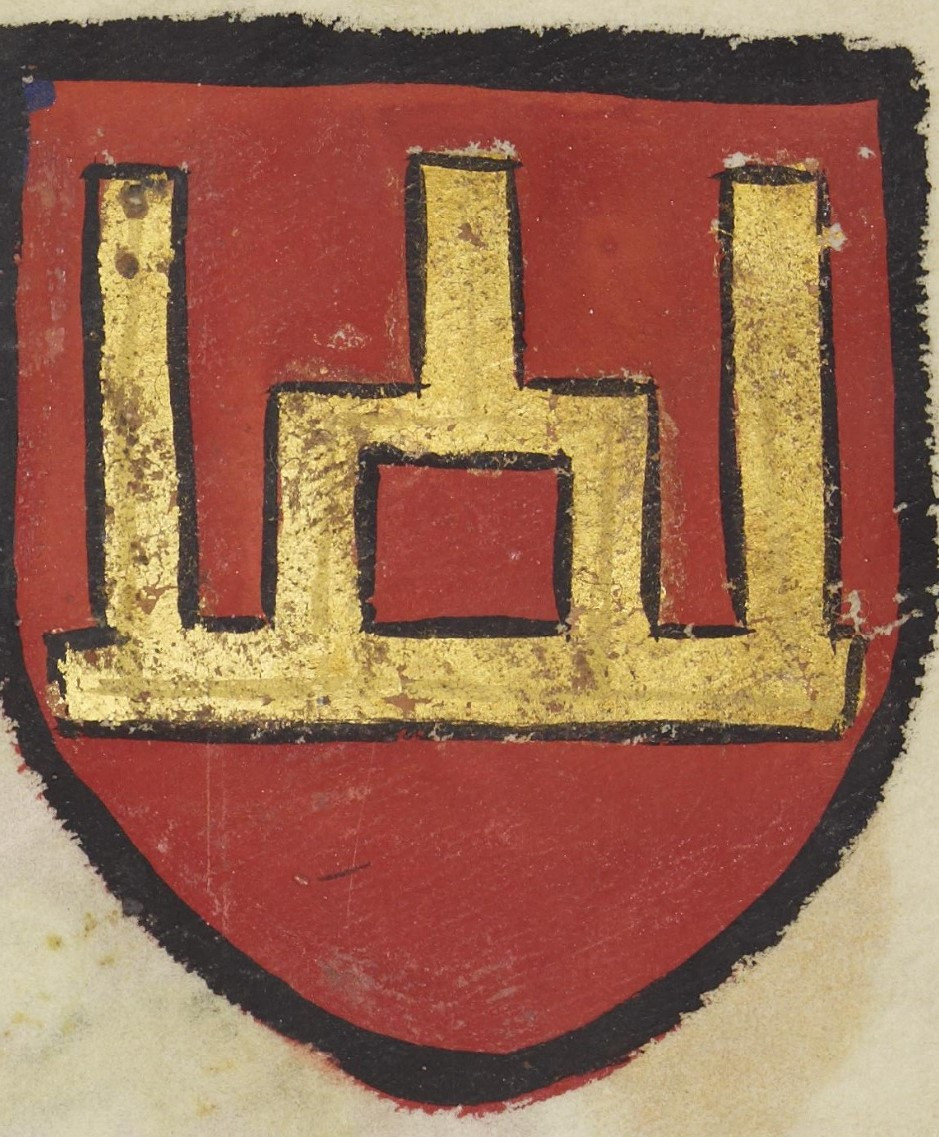
Columns of Gediminas

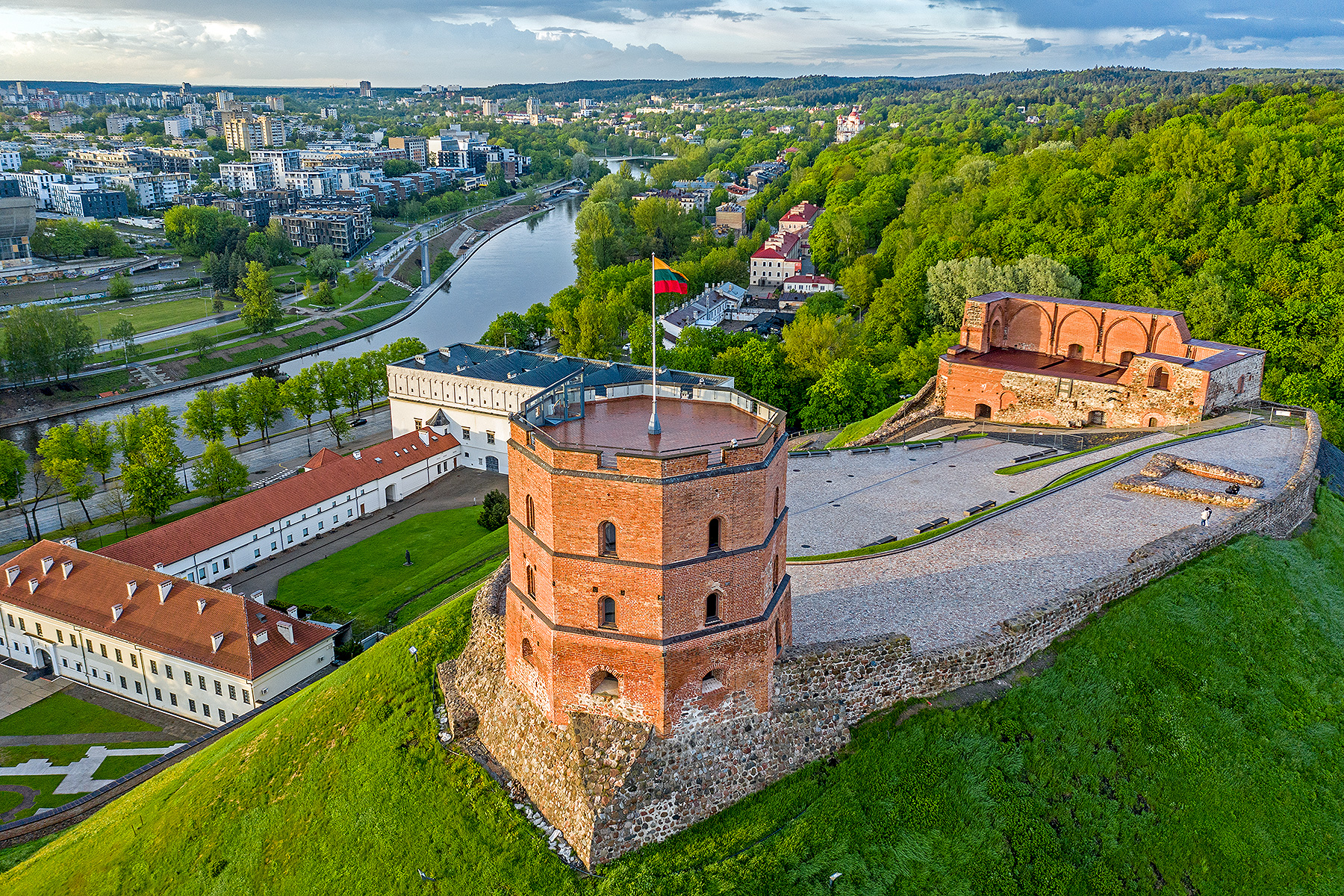
Gediminas' Tower and other remnants of the Upper Castle in Vilnius

From 1263 to 1269, Lithuania had three grand dukes – Treniota, Vaišvilkas, and Švarnas. The state did not disintegrate, however, and Traidenis came to power in 1269. Traidenis strengthened Lithuanian control in Black Ruthenia, fought with the Livonian Order, winning the Battle of Karuse in 1270 and the Battle of Aizkraukle in 1279, and assisted the Yotvingians/Sudovians to defend from the Teutonic Order. For his military assistance, Nameisis recognized Traidenis as his suzerain. There is considerable uncertainty about the identities of the grand dukes of Lithuania between Traidenis' death in 1282 and the assumption of power by Vytenis in 1295. The country's capital was located in Kernavė until 1316 or 1321 where Traidenis and Vytenis mainly resided and led to its prosperity.

During this time, the Orders finalized their conquests. In 1274, the Great Prussian Rebellion ended, and the Teutonic Knights proceeded to conquer other Baltic tribes: the Nadruvians and Skalvians in 1274–1277, and the Yotvingians in 1283; the Livonian Order completed its conquest of Semigalia, the last Baltic ally of Lithuania, in 1291. The Orders could now turn their full attention to Lithuania. The "buffer zone" composed of other Baltic tribes had disappeared, and Grand Duchy of Lithuania was left to battle the Orders on its own.

The Gediminid dynasty ruled the grand duchy for over a century, and Vytenis was the first ruler of the dynasty. During his reign Lithuania was in constant war with the Order, the Kingdom of Poland, and Ruthenia. Vytenis was involved in succession disputes in Poland, supporting Boleslaus II of Masovia, who was married to a Lithuanian duchess, Gaudemunda. In Ruthenia, Vytenis managed to recapture lands lost after the assassination of Mindaugas and to capture the principalities of Pinsk and Turov. In the struggle against the Order, Vytenis allied with Riga's citizens; securing positions in Riga strengthened trade routes and provided a base for further military campaigns. Around 1307, Polotsk, an important trading centre, was annexed by military force. Vytenis also began constructing a defensive castle network along Nemunas. Gradually this network developed into the main defensive line against the Teutonic Order.

=== Territorial expansion ===
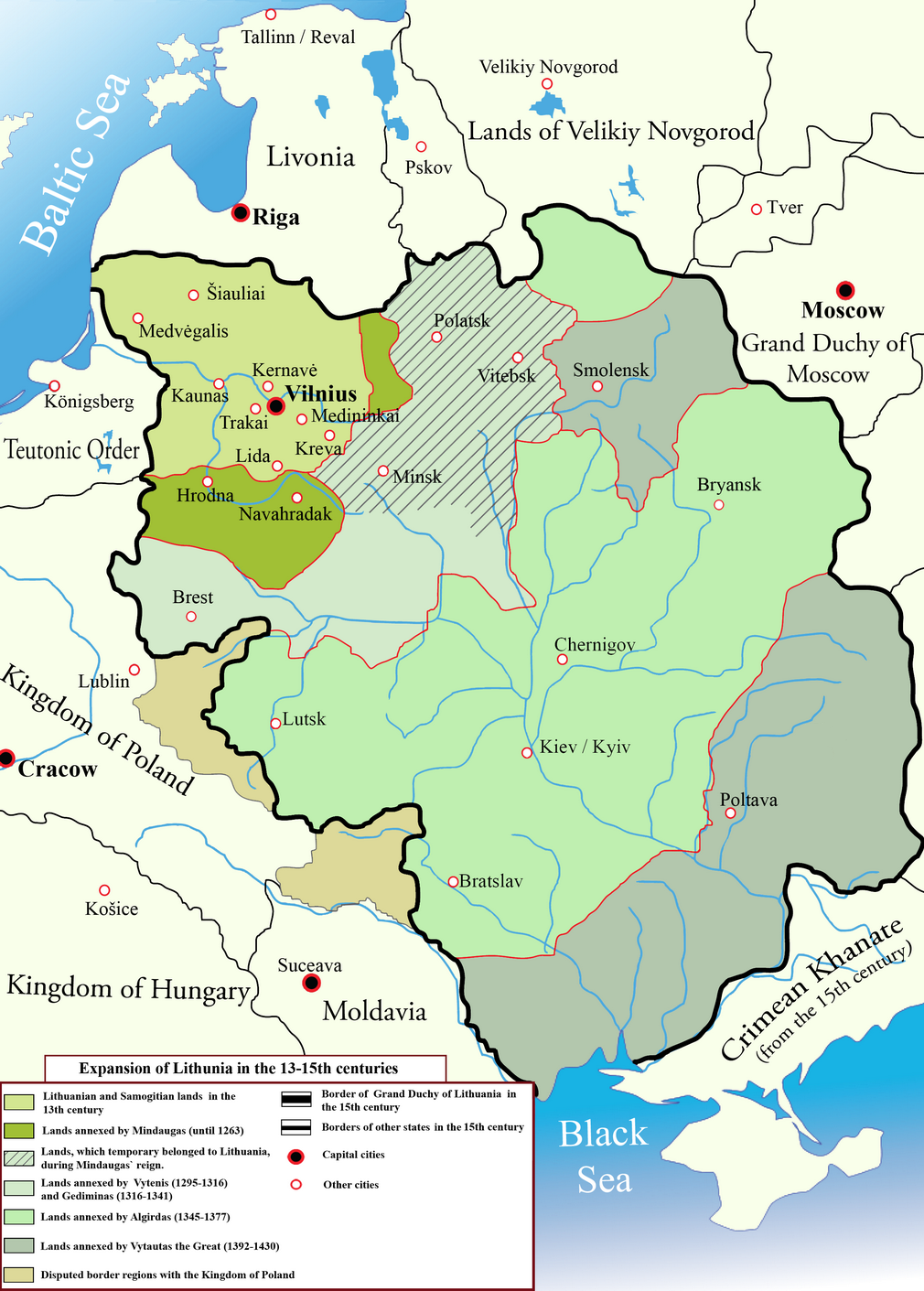
Lithuanian state in 13–15th centuries

The expansion of the state reached its height under Grand Duke Gediminas, also titled by some contemporaneous German sources as Rex de Owsteiten (English: King of Aukštaitija), who created a strong central government and established an empire that later spread from the Black Sea to the Baltic Sea. In 1320, most of the principalities of western Rus' were either vassalized or annexed by Lithuania. In 1321, Gediminas captured Kiev, sending Stanislav, the last Rurikid to rule Kiev, into exile. Gediminas also re-established the permanent capital of the Grand Duchy in Vilnius, presumably moving it from Old Trakai in 1323, which previously served as the country's capital since 1316 or 1321. The state continued to expand its territory under the reign of Grand Duke Algirdas and his brother Kęstutis, who both ruled the state harmonically. During the inaugurations of Lithuanian monarchs until 1569, the Gediminas' Cap was placed on the monarch's heads by the Bishop of Vilnius in Vilnius Cathedral.

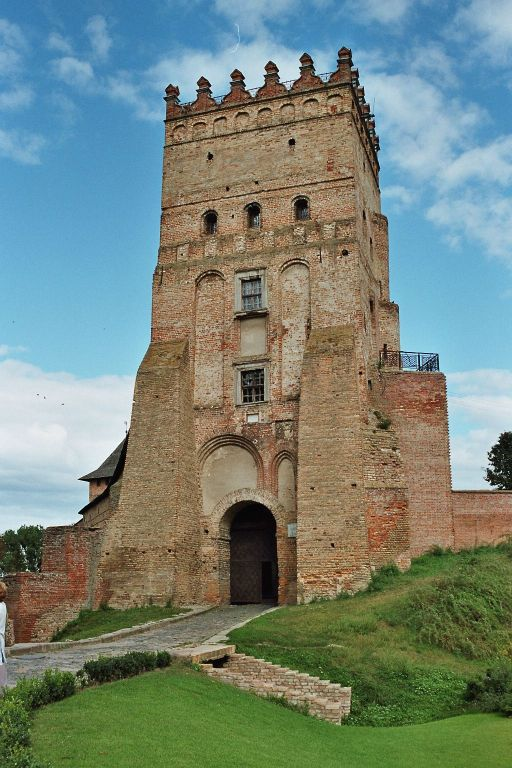
Lubart's Castle in Ukraine, built by the son of Gediminas' Liubartas in the mid-14th century, is famous for the Congress of Lutsk which took place in 1429

Grand Duchy of Lithuania under the rule of Vytautas the Great (1392–1430)

Lithuania was in a good position to conquer the western and the southern parts of the former Kievan Rus'. While almost every other state around it had been plundered or defeated by the Mongols, the hordes stopped at the modern borders of Belarus, and the core territory of the Grand Duchy was left mostly untouched. The weak control of the Mongols over the areas they had conquered allowed the expansion of Lithuania to accelerate. Rus' principalities were never incorporated directly into the Golden Horde, maintaining vassal relationships with a fair degree of independence. Lithuania annexed some of these areas as vassals through diplomacy, as they exchanged rule by the Mongols or the Grand Prince of Moscow with rule by the Grand Duchy. An example is Novgorod, which was often in the Lithuanian sphere of influence and became an occasional dependency of the Grand Duchy. Lithuanian control resulted from internal frictions within the city, which attempted to escape submission to Moscow. Such relationships could be tenuous, however, as changes in a city's internal politics could disrupt Lithuanian control, as happened on a number of occasions with Novgorod and other East-Slavic cities.

The Grand Duchy of Lithuania managed to hold off Mongol incursions and eventually secured gains. In 1333 and 1339, Lithuanians defeated large Mongol forces attempting to regain Smolensk from the Lithuanian sphere of influence. By about 1355, the State of Moldavia had formed, and the Golden Horde did little to re-vassalize the area. In 1362, regiments of the Grand Duchy army defeated the Golden Horde at the Battle at Blue Waters.

In 1380, a Lithuanian army allied with Russian forces to defeat the Golden Horde in the Battle of Kulikovo, and though the rule of the Mongols did not end, their influence in the region waned thereafter. In 1387, Moldavia became a vassal of Poland and, in a broader sense, of Lithuania. By this time, Lithuania had conquered the territory of the Golden Horde all the way to the Dnieper River. In a crusade against the Golden Horde in 1398 (in an alliance with Tokhtamysh), Lithuania invaded northern Crimea and won a decisive victory. In an attempt to place Tokhtamish on the Golden Horde throne in 1399, Lithuania moved against the Horde but was defeated in the Battle of the Vorskla River, losing the steppe region.

=== One of the largest European countries, ruled by Gediminids–Jagiellonians ===
Poland and Lithuania in 1386–1434

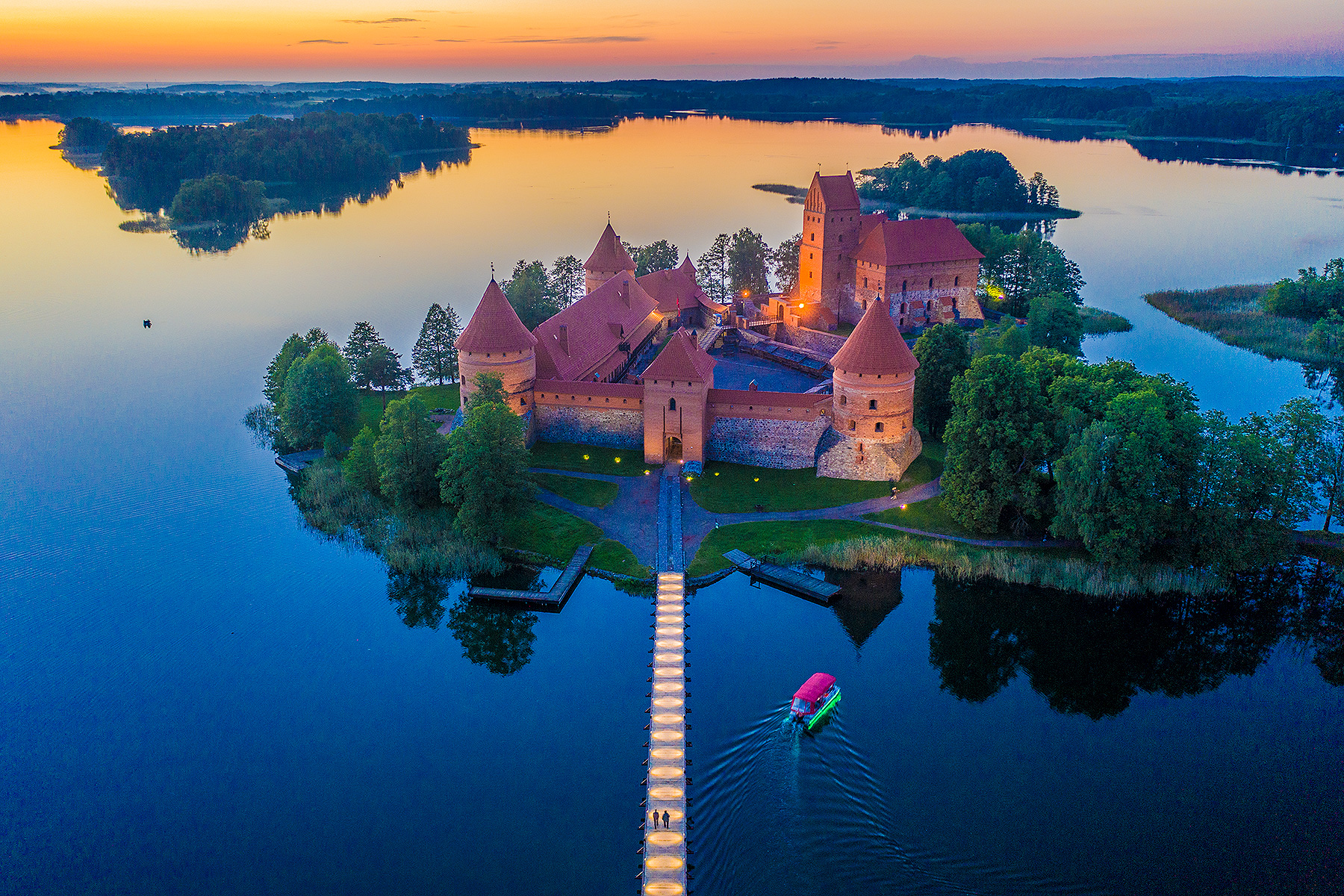
Trakai Island Castle, built by Grand Duke Vytautas, which served as a residence of Lithuanian Grand Dukes

Lithuania was Christianized in 1387, led by Jogaila, who personally translated Christian prayers into the Lithuanian language and his cousin Vytautas the Great who founded many Catholic churches and allocated lands for parishes in Lithuania. The state reached a peak (becoming one of the largest countries territorially in Europe) under Vytautas the Great, who ruled over the Grand Duchy as regent from 1392 to 1401 and as Grand Duke from 1401 to 1430. Vytautas was one of the most famous rulers of the Grand Duchy of Lithuania, serving as the Grand Duke from 1401 to 1430, and as the Prince of Hrodna (1370–1382) and the Prince of Lutsk (1387–1389). Vytautas was the son of Kęstutis, uncle of Jogaila, who became King of Poland in 1386, and he was the grandfather of Vasili II of Moscow.

In 1410, Vytautas commanded the forces of the Grand Duchy in the Battle of Grunwald. The battle ended in a decisive Polish–Lithuanian victory against the Teutonic Order. The war of Lithuania against military Orders, which lasted for more than 200 years, and was one of the longest wars in the history of Europe, was finally ended. Vytautas backed the economic development of the state and introduced many reforms. Under his rule, the Grand Duchy of Lithuania slowly became more centralized, as the governours loyal to Vytautas replaced local princes with dynastic ties to the throne. The governours were rich landowners who formed the basis for the nobility of the Grand Duchy. During Vytautas' rule, the Radziwiłł and Goštautas families started to gain influence.

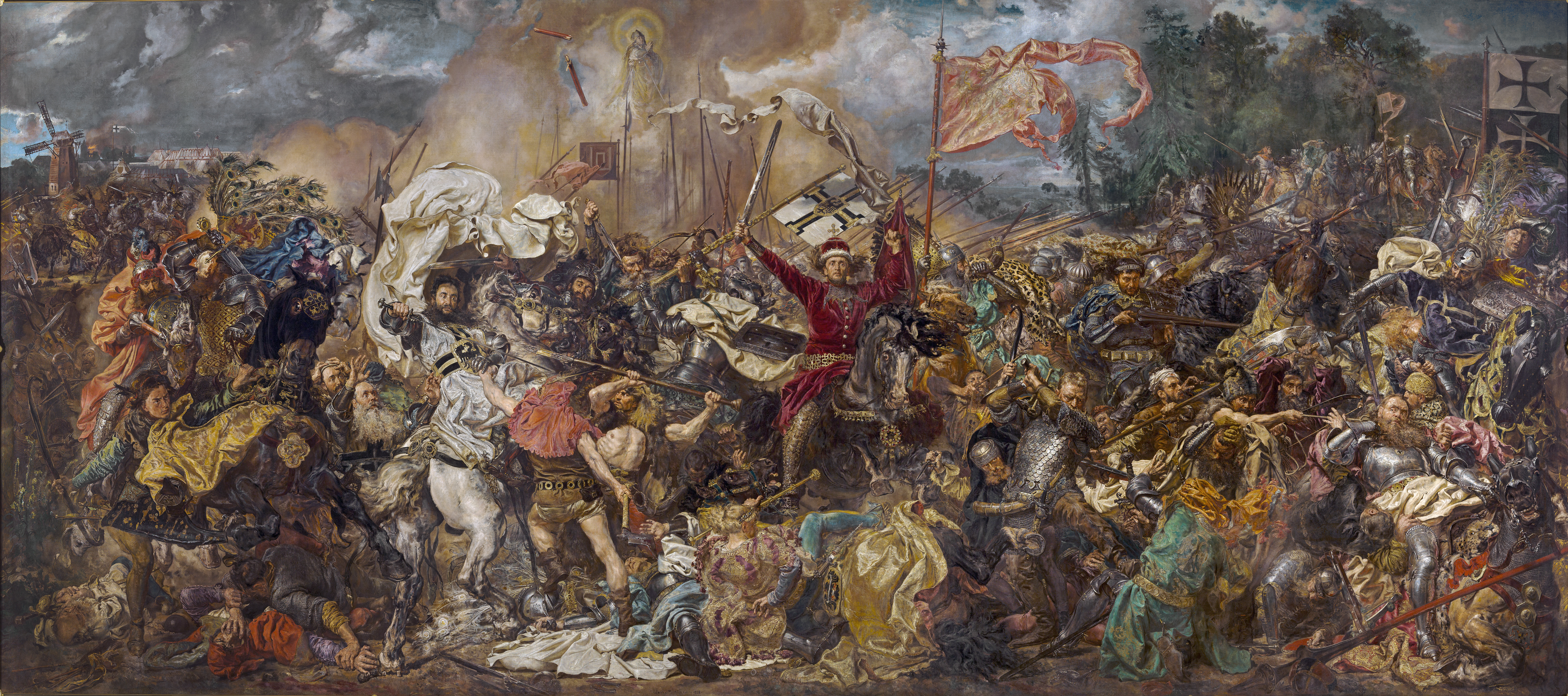
The Battle of Grunwald, 1410, with Ulrich von Jungingen and Vytautas at center

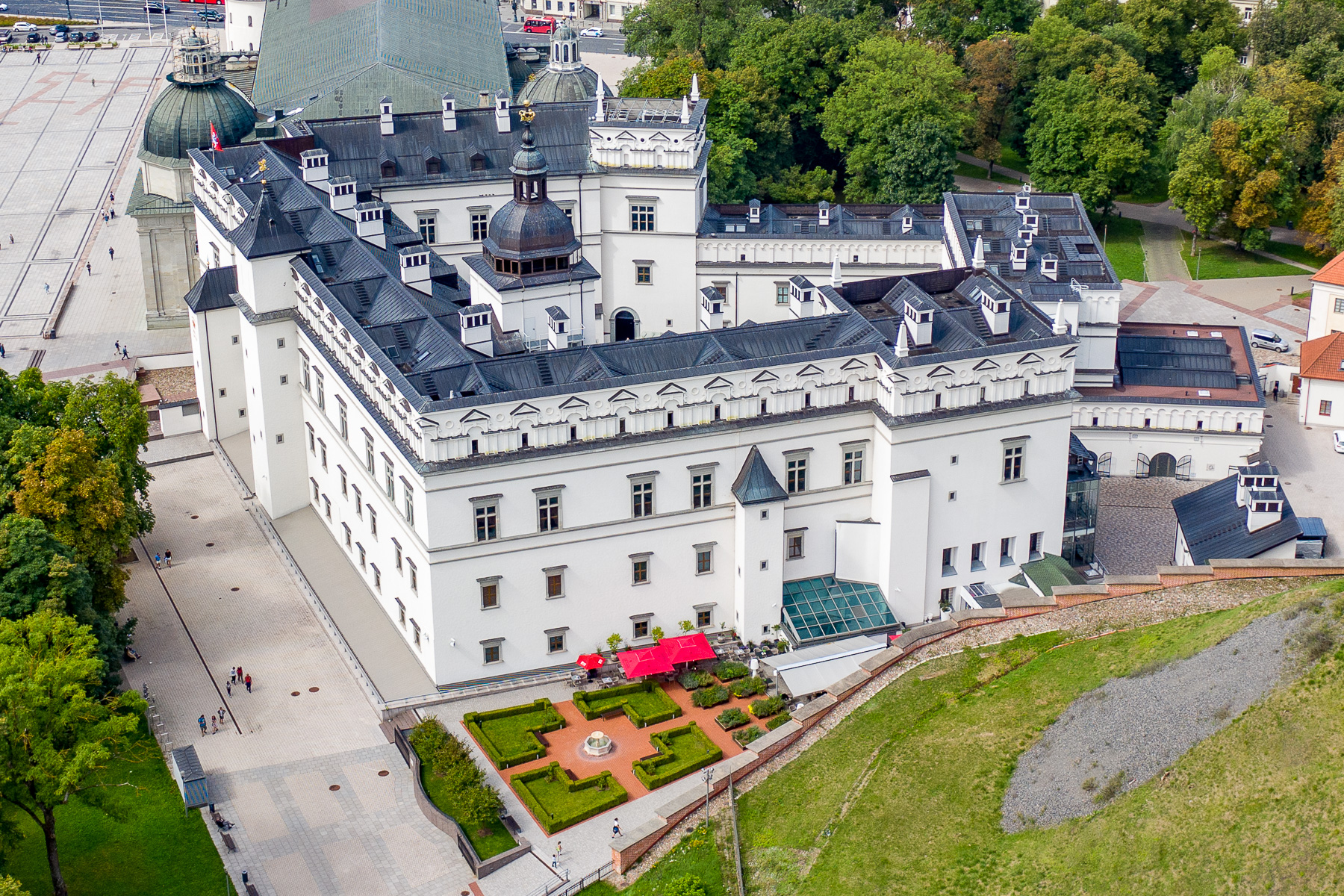
Restored Palace of the Grand Dukes of Lithuania, which was reconstructed in a Renaissance style by Sigismund I the Old and his son Sigismund II Augustus

In 1440, Casimir IV Jagiellon was sent by his older brother Władysław III to Lithuania to rule in his name, however instead a manifestation of the sovereignty of Lithuania occurred when Casimir was elected as the Grand Duke of Lithuania upon his arrival to Vilnius on 29 June 1440 and subsequently titled himself as a "free lord" (pan – dominus), this way breaching the agreements of the Union of Grodno (1432) and terminating the Polish–Lithuanian union; Casimir also became the King of Poland in 1447. Following Casimir's death in 1492, the factual termination of the Polish–Lithuanian union also occurred during the reign of Casimir's sons Alexander Jagiellon and John I Albert who had respectively ruled Lithuania and Poland separately in 1492–1501.

The rapid expansion of the influence of Moscow soon put it into a comparable position to the Grand Duchy of Lithuania, and after the annexation of Novgorod Republic in 1478, Muscovy was among the preeminent states in northeastern Europe. Between 1492 and 1508, Ivan III further consolidated Muscovy, winning the key Battle of Vedrosha and capturing such ancient lands of Kievan Rus' as Chernihiv and Bryansk.

On 8 September 1514, the allied forces of the Grand Duchy of Lithuania and the Kingdom of Poland, under the command of Hetman Konstanty Ostrogski, fought the Battle of Orsha against the army of the Grand Duchy of Moscow, under Konyushy Ivan Chelyadnin and Kniaz Mikhail Golitsin. The battle was part of a long series of Muscovite–Lithuanian Wars conducted by Russian rulers striving to gather all the former lands of Kievan Rus' under their rule. According to Rerum Moscoviticarum Commentarii by Sigismund von Herberstein, the primary source for the information on the battle, the much smaller army of Poland–Lithuania (under 30,000 men) defeated the 80,000 Muscovite soldiers, capturing their camp and commander. The Muscovites lost about 30,000 men, while the losses of the Poland–Lithuania army totalled only 500. While the battle is remembered as one of the greatest Lithuanian victories, Muscovy ultimately prevailed in the war. Under the 1522 peace treaty, the Grand Duchy of Lithuania made large territorial concessions.

=== Polish–Lithuanian Commonwealth ===
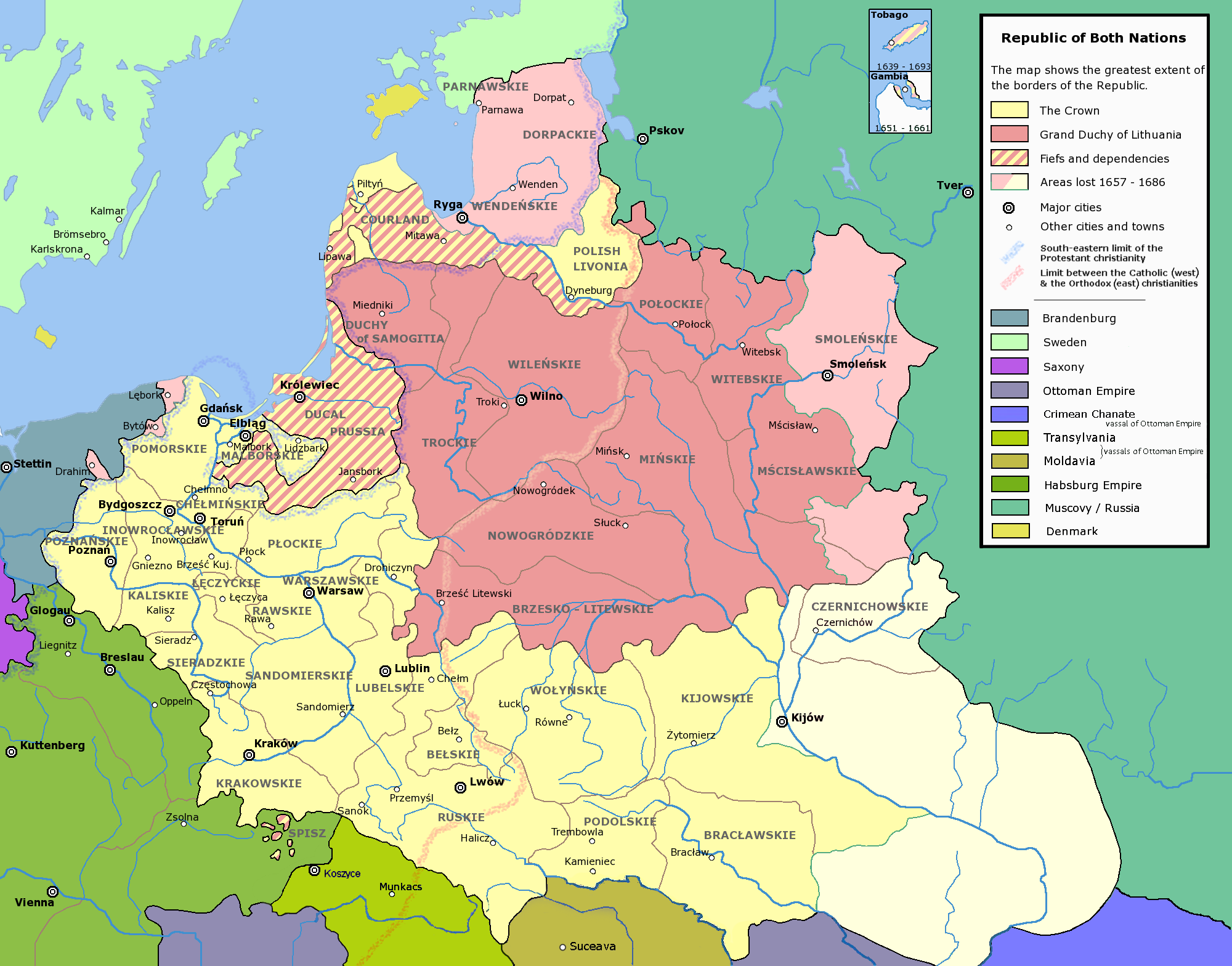
The Grand Duchy of Lithuania within the Polish–Lithuanian Commonwealth c. 1635

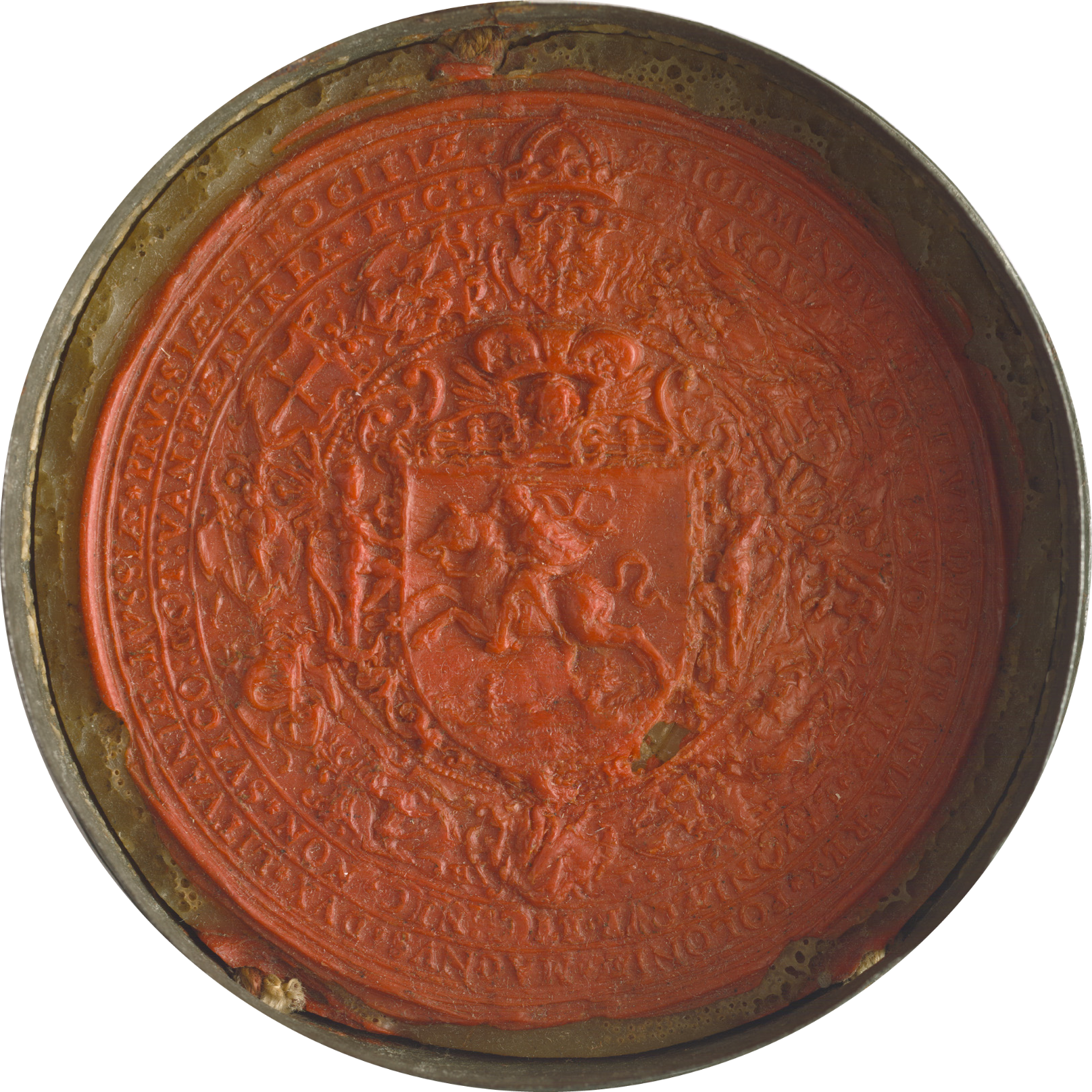
The preservation of the Great Seal of Lithuania (pictured, dating to 1623) when concluding the Union of Lublin meant that the elected monarchs acts without being confirmed with the Lithuanian seals were void in Lithuania. These Lithuanian seals were in possession of the Lithuanian Grand Chancellor (Great Seal) and Lithuanian Vice-Chancellor (Lesser Seal).

The wars with the Teutonic Order, the loss of land to Moscow, and the continued pressure threatened the survival of the state of Lithuania, so it was forced to ally more closely with Poland, forming a real union with the Kingdom of Poland in the Union of Lublin of 1569. The union was formally called the Kingdom of Poland and the Grand Duchy of Lithuania, however now commonly known as the Polish–Lithuanian Commonwealth. During the period of the Union, many of the territories formerly controlled by the Grand Duchy of Lithuania were transferred to the Crown of the Polish Kingdom, while the gradual process of Polonization slowly drew Lithuania itself under Polish domination.

Following the death of Grand Duke Sigismund II Augustus in 1572, a joint Polish–Lithuanian monarch was to be elected as in the Union of Lublin it was agreed that the title "Grand Duke of Lithuania" will be received by a jointly elected monarch in the Election sejm on his accession to the throne, thus losing its former institutional significance, however the Union of Lublin guaranteed that the institution and the title "Grand Duke of Lithuania" will be preserved.

In 1573, Henry Valua was elected as the first joint Polish–Lithuanian monarch, however his rule was short and he never personally visited the Grand Duchy of Lithuania, despite being announced as the Grand Duke of Lithuania.

The double election of 1575 was held in the presence of a small number of Lithuanian lords, who additionally supported the Habsburg candidate Emperor Maximilian II, however, the race for the crown was won by Stephen Báthory, crowned on May 1, 1576. The Lithuanian lords, at a convention in Grodno (on 8–20 April 1576), protested this choice, threatening to break the union and giving themselves the right to choose a separate ruler. However, the king managed to rally the Lithuanian delegation by promising to preserve their rights and freedoms. On May 29, 1580, in Vilnius Cathedral, King and Grand Duke Stephen Báthory received from the hand of the bishop of Samogitia Merkelis Giedraitis a blessed sword and hat, given by Pope Gregory XIII through the envoy Paweł Uchański. This was a recognition by the Pope of the ruler's successes in the struggle against the infidels. In Lithuania, this ceremony was treated as the celebration of the elevation of the Grand Duke of Lithuania, during which Lithuania's sovereignty was manifested. Báthory's reign was marked with successful Livonian campaign against tsar Ivan the Terrible's military forces, which resulted in the reintegration of Polotsk to Lithuania and the restoration of control of the Duchy of Livonia.

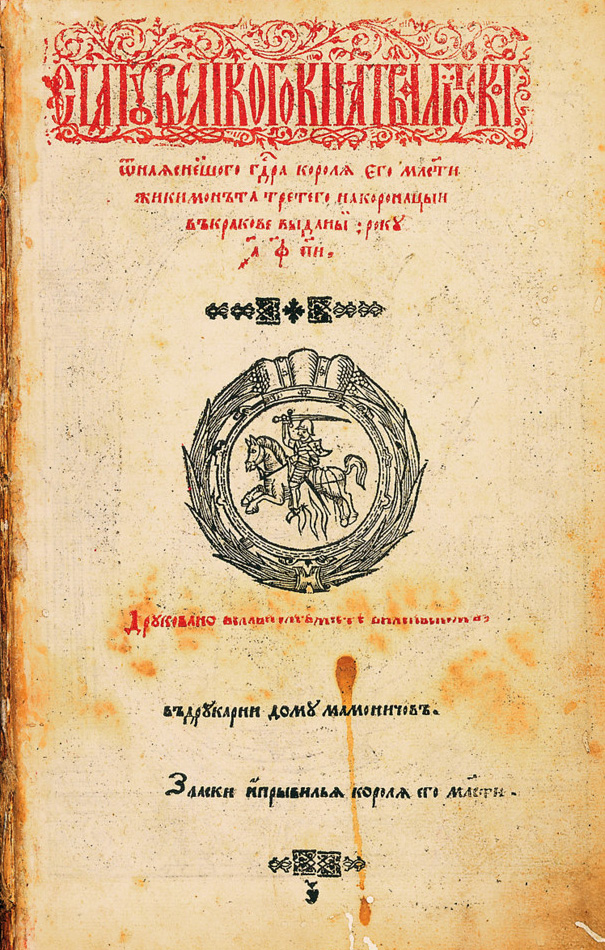
The Third Statute of Lithuania (confirmed in 1588), which stated that Poland and Lithuania have equal rights within the Commonwealth

The rule of Lithuania by the Gediminid–Jagiellonian family representatives resumed through matrilineal line following the death of Báthory (1586) when Sigismund III Vasa (son of Catherine Jagiellon) was elected in 1587. On 28 January 1588, Sigismund III confirmed the Third Statute of Lithuania which stated that the Polish–Lithuanian Commonwealth is a federation of two countries – Poland and Lithuania where both countries have equal rights within it and separated the powers of the ruler, the Seimas, the executive and the courts (this for the first time in European history ensured the rule of law in the state, but Lithuania's citizens, who were subjects to the Statute, were only nobles). During the Polish–Swedish War (1600–1611) Polish and Lithuanian forces achieved victory and restored status quo ante bellum, notably winning the decisive Battle of Kircholm in 1605, while during the Polish–Muscovite War (1605–1618) Polish and Lithuanian armies achieved territorial gains (e.g. restored the control of Smolensk, the capital of the Smolensk Voivodeship, in 1611) and for the first time fully captured Russia's capital Moscow in 1610. Sigismund III's son, Władysław IV Vasa, began ruling Lithuania in 1632 and achieved military success and popularity during the Smolensk War, but he renounced his claims to the Russian throne per the Treaty of Polyanovka in 1634 and failed at reclaiming the Swedish throne.

John II Casimir Vasa's reign was initially marked with disastrous military loses as during the Deluge in the mid-17th century most of the territory of Lithuania was annexed by the Tsardom of Russia and even the Lithuania's capital Vilnius was captured for the first time by a foreign army and ravaged. In 1655, Lithuania unilaterally seceded from Poland, declared the Swedish King Charles X Gustav as the Grand Duke of Lithuania and fell under the protection of the Swedish Empire. However, by 1657 Lithuania was once again a part of the Commonwealth following the Lithuanian revolt against the Swedes. Lithuania's capital Vilnius was liberated in 1661, but suffered immense damage. In 1673, Lithuanian Grand Chancellor Krzysztof Zygmunt Pac initiated a ruling, which was confirmed, that every third ordinary general Sejm of the Polish–Lithuanian Commonwealth must thenceforth be held in Lithuania's territory Grodno city (the first such Sejm was hosted in the Old Grodno Castle and later the New Grodno Castle was built as monarch's new residence in Lithuania and sejms convening place), but factually the sejms were held less frequently on the territory of Lithuania (in total 11 in Grodno and 148 in Warsaw).

Throughout this Polish–Lithuanian Union period, the Grand Duchy of Lithuania remained a separate state and retained many rights in the federation (including separate name, territory, coat of arms, ministries, ruling system, laws, army, courts, treasury, and seal) until the Constitution of 3 May and Reciprocal Guarantee of Two Nations were passed in 1791. During the 1788–1792 Great Sejm in Warsaw the majority of deputies of the Grand Duchy of Lithuania opposed the Polish deputies aspirations to abolish the separateness of the Grand Duchy of Lithuania and the majority of Lithuanian deputies supported the adoption of the Constituon on a compromise that more sovereignty and rights will be granted to the Grand Duchy of Lithuania in the unitary state, therefore later on 20 October 1791 the Reciprocal Guarantee of Two Nations, an addendum to the Constitution, was adopted unanimously by the Great Sejm. In November 1793, the Grodno Sejm formally abolished the Constitution of 3 May 1791 and it was the last convening Sejm of the Polish–Lithuanian Commonwealth.

=== Partitions and the Napoleonic period ===
Following the partitions of the Polish–Lithuanian Commonwealth, most of the lands of the former Grand Duchy of Lithuania were directly annexed by the Russian Empire, the rest by Kingdom of Prussia (see: New East Prussia). Following the death of Russian Empress Catherine the Great, since 1796 a non-sovereign administrative-territorial unit of the Russian Empire (governorate) called Lithuania Governorate with its capital in Vilnius briefly existed until in 1801 it was divided into separate Lithuania–Vilna and Lithuania–Grodno governorates. The Russian Emperors formally also titled themselves as the Grand Dukes of Lithuania. The Third Statute of Lithuania was valid in the former territory of the Grand Duchy of Lithuania until 7 July 1840 and was printed in Russian capital Saint Petersburg in 1811.

In 1812, just prior to the French invasion of Russia, the former Grand Duchy of Lithuania revolted against the Russians. Soon after his arrival in Vilnius, Napoleon proclaimed the creation of a Commissary Provisional Government of the Grand Duchy of Lithuania which, in turn, renewed the Polish-Lithuanian Union. The union was never formalized, however, as only half a year later Napoleon's Grande Armée was pushed out of Russia and forced to retreat further westwards. In December 1812, Vilnius was recaptured by Russian forces, bringing all plans for the recreation of the Grand Duchy of Lithuania to an end. Most of the lands of the former Grand Duchy of Lithuania were re-annexed by Russia. The Augustów Voivodeship (later Augustów Governorate), including the counties of Marijampolė and Kalvarija, was attached to the Kingdom of Poland, a rump state in personal union with Russia.

== Administrative division ==
Lithuania and its administrative divisions in 1385.

Lithuania and its administrative divisions in 1430

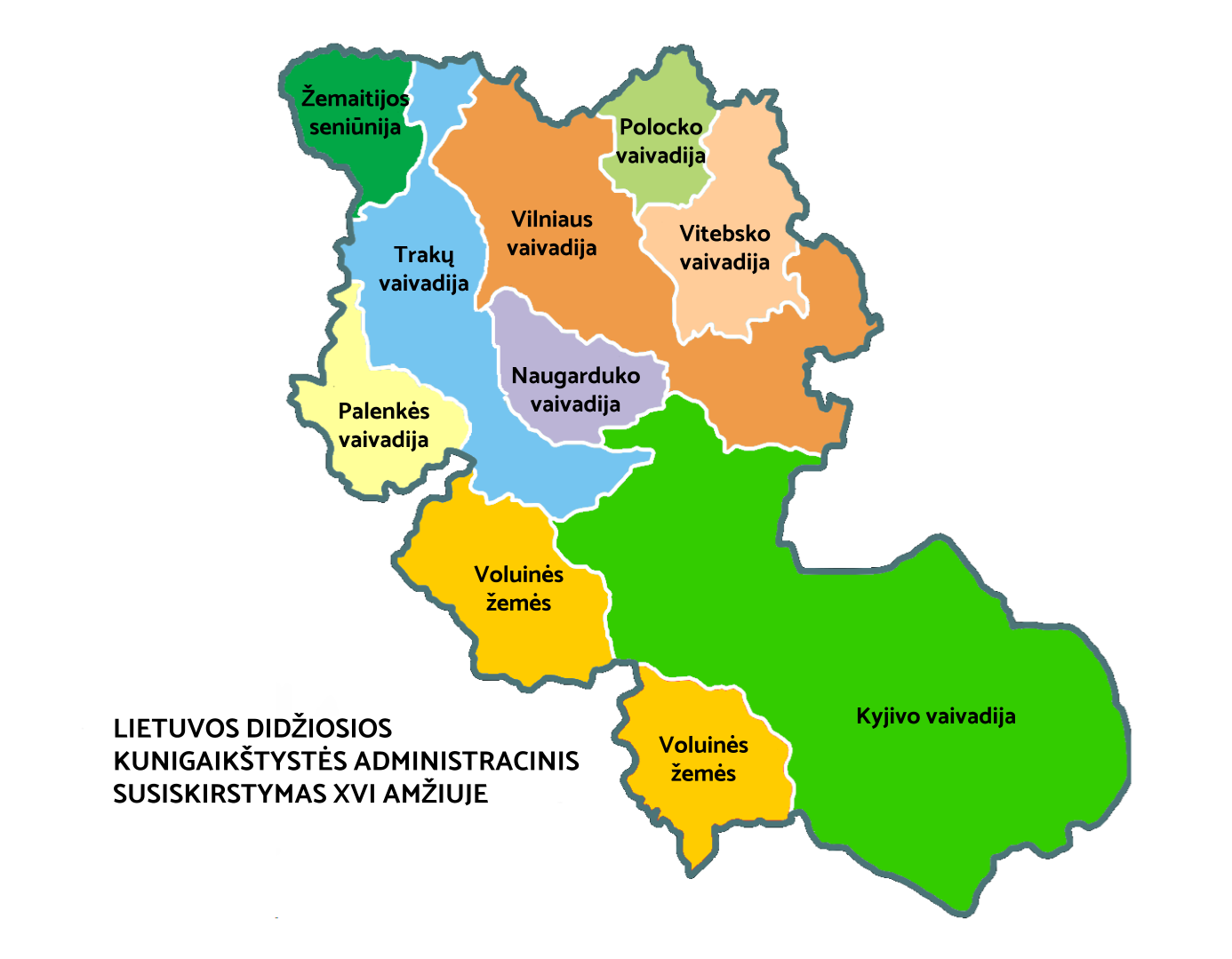
Administrative divisions of Lithuania in the 16th century

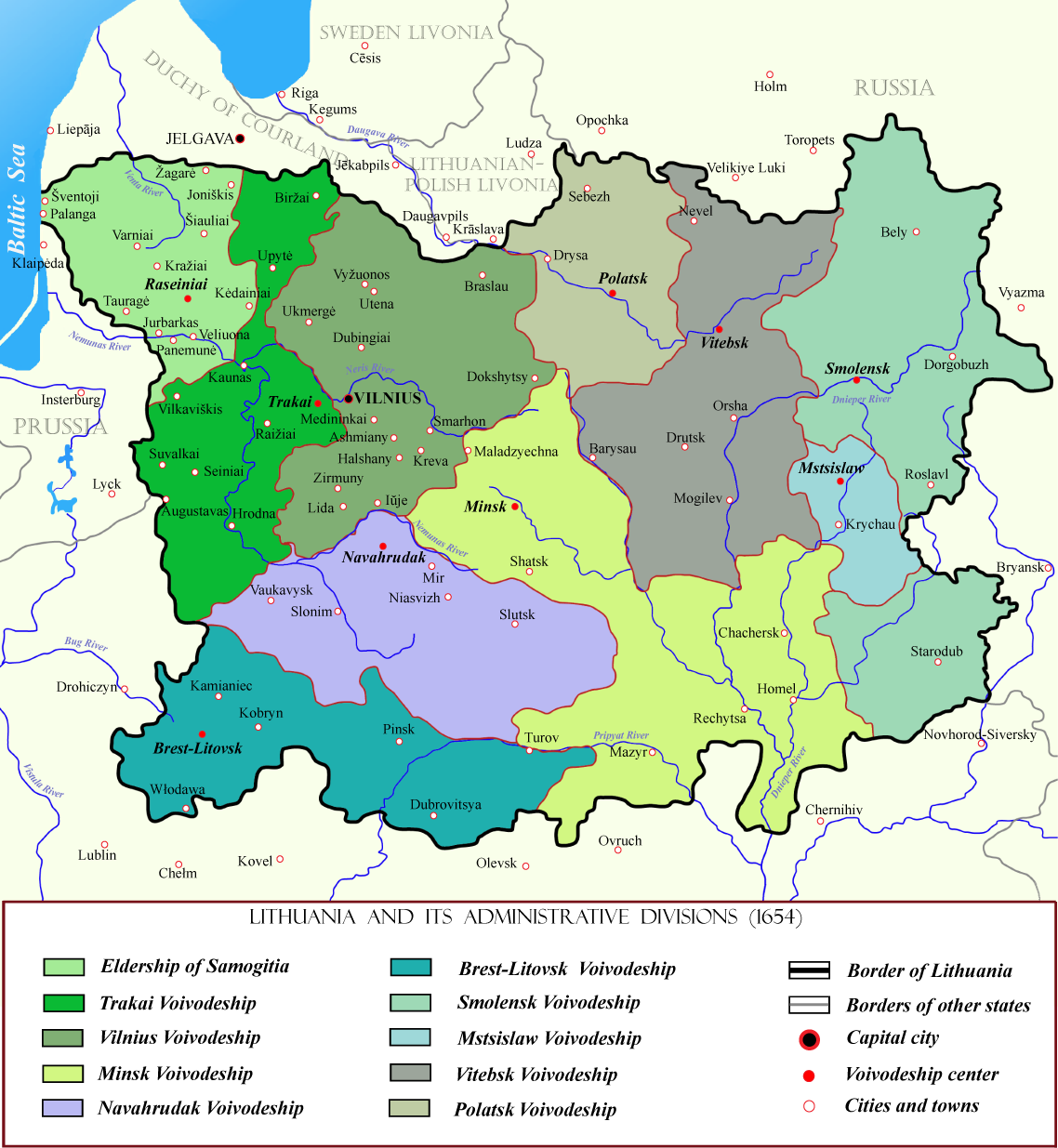
Lithuania and its administrative divisions in the 17th century

Administrative structure of the Grand Duchy of Lithuania (1413–1564).

Voivodeship (Palatinatus)	Established
Vilnius	1413
Trakai	1413
Samogitian eldership	1413
Kiev	1471
Polotsk	1504
Naugardukas	1507
Smolensk	1508
Vitebsk	1511
Podlaskie	1514
Brest Litovsk	1566
Minsk	1566
Mstislavl	1569
Volhyn	1564–1566
Bratslav	1564
Duchy of Livonia	1561

== Cities ==
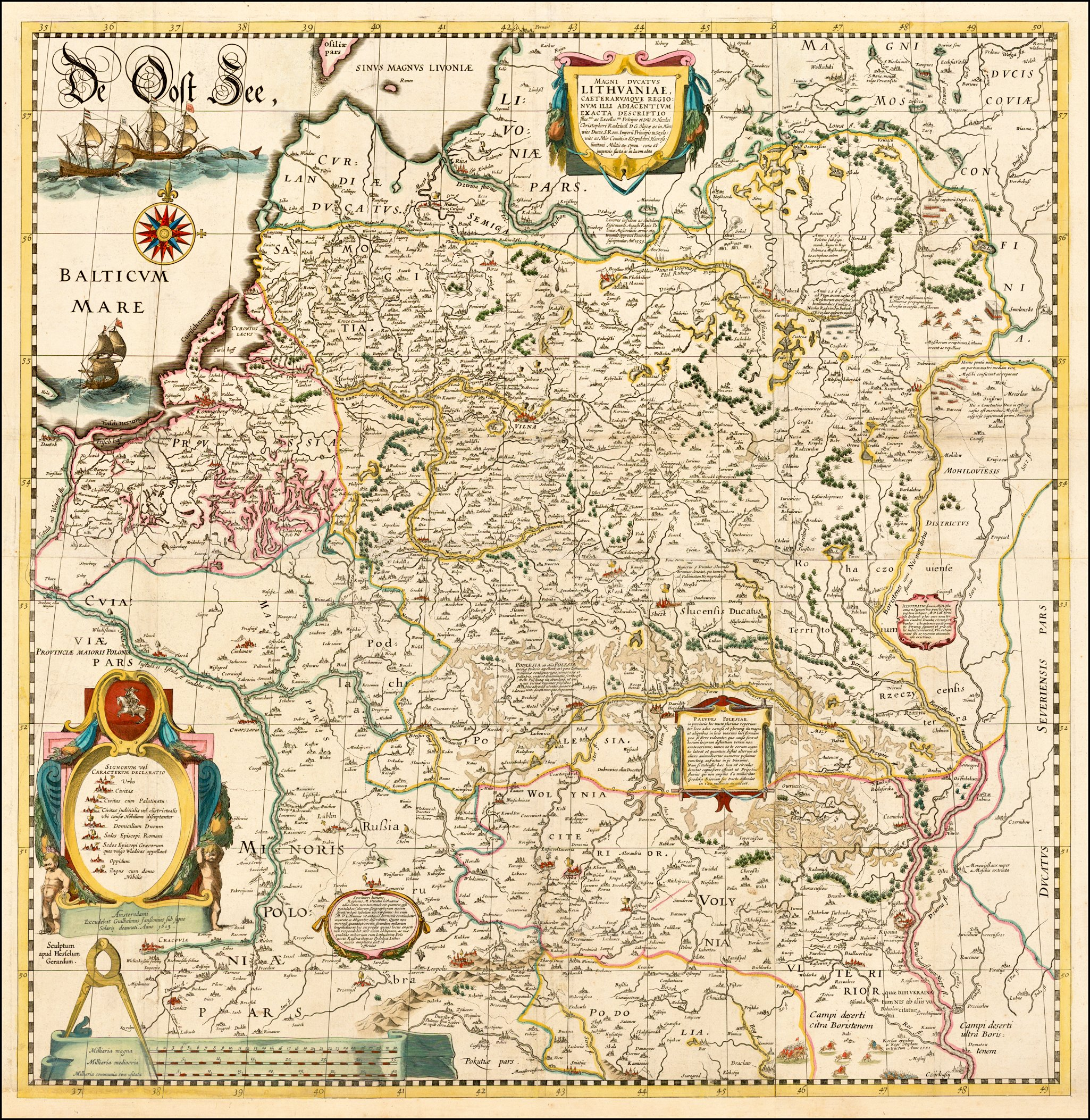
Radziwiłł map of Lithuania from 1613, featuring around 1020 settlements.

In Lithuania, the first proto-urban settlements formed in the 9th–13th centuries, often around castles where craftsmen and merchants settled, with Vilnius, Kaunas, Kernavė, Merkinė, and Veliuona becoming early centers; in the Christianized regions of the Grand Duchy, towns such as Gardinas (Grodno), Lyda (Lida), and Naugardukas (Navahrudak) developed, while Klaipėda was established in the Teutonic Order’s domain. Many smaller settlements remained agrarian and did not resemble the Western European urban model, and systematic town development only accelerated after 1387, when Vilnius received Magdeburg rights, followed soon after by Brest and Grodno. True cities were considered only those with municipal self-government and a magistrate, although the term was also applied to administrative centers without formal rights or to places unable to exercise them effectively; trade and crafts distinguished them from rural settlements. The municipal authority was the magistrate, while judicial functions were carried out by bench courts, and royal cities were overseen by a vogt, though the presence of noble and ecclesiastical jurisdictions often hindered growth. In the 15th–16th centuries, urban rights spread to both Lithuanian and Slavic cities, including Kyiv, Polotsk, Vitebsk, and Smolensk, while the burgher estate gradually formed from merchants and wealthy artisans; larger cities (Vilnius, Gardinas, Trakai, Kaunas, Kėdainiai) were multiethnic, inhabited not only by Lithuanians but also Ruthenians, Poles, Jews, Germans, Tatars, and Karaites. The Volok Reform (1553–1557) reorganized cities into rectangular plots, introduced regular squares with town halls, and stimulated trade, guilds, and privileges, leading to a sharp increase in the number of towns with self-government. However, the mid-17th-century wars with Russia and Sweden devastated Lithuania’s urban centers, causing massive population losses, and subsequent crises such as the Great Northern War, famine, and plague delayed recovery until the mid-18th century. In 1776, the autonomy of many declining cities was abolished, but the urban law of 1791 restored municipal rights to 42 cities and granted them for the first time to 18 others, reaffirming Magdeburg principles in the last decades of the Grand Duchy.

== Military ==
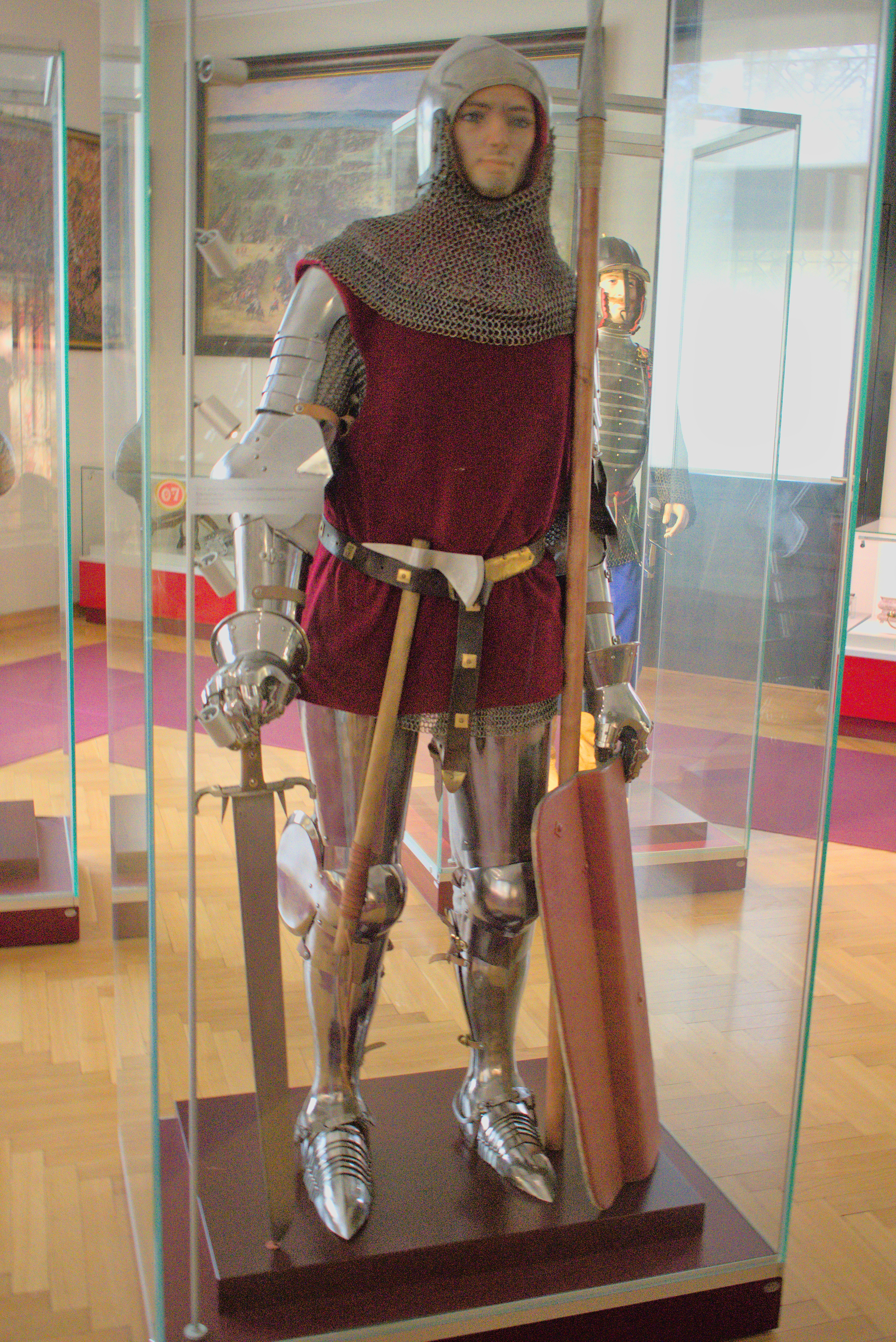
Leitis — the elite warrior of the Grand Duchy of Lithuania, early 15th century, reconstruction.

The Army of the Grand Duchy of Lithuania was a key institution that shaped the state’s political and military power from the 13th to the 18th century. Its origins lay in early local militias formed by Lithuanian tribes, where all able-bodied men were called to defend their land. As the Grand Duchy emerged under Mindaugas, the army became more centralized, combining the forces of local dukes and their retinues (kariaunos). Throughout the 13th and 14th centuries, Lithuanian troops fought constant wars against the Teutonic and Livonian Orders, as well as against Rus’ principalities and the Golden Horde. This period saw the gradual transition from irregular tribal warfare to a structured military system, including permanent garrisons, fortifications along the Nemunas River, and organized cavalry units. The army’s weaponry evolved from simple axes and spears to swords, bows, and eventually firearms and artillery. By the 15th and 16th centuries, under rulers such as Vytautas the Great, the Lithuanian army reached a high level of organization and discipline, modeled increasingly on Western European forces. The introduction of the noble levy made military service the main duty of the nobility, while wealthier magnates maintained their own well-equipped regiments. The army, led by grand and field hetmans, became a professional institution capable of large-scale campaigns, achieving major victories at the Battle of Grunwald (1410) against the Teutonic Order and Orsha (1514) against Muscovite forces. Over time, specialized branches developed, including heavy cavalry, hussars, dragoons, artillery, and later, frontier guards for border defense. However, by the 17th and 18th centuries, continuous wars with Sweden, Russia, and the Ottoman Empire, combined with internal political decline and growing foreign influence, weakened the Grand Duchy’s military strength. Despite attempts at reform—such as the creation of regular regiments and national cavalry brigades—the army struggled to match the resources of neighboring powers. Following the partitions of the Polish–Lithuanian Commonwealth in the late 18th century, the Lithuanian army was officially disbanded in 1795. Nevertheless, its military traditions endured, inspiring later uprisings in 1830–31 and 1863–64, where Lithuanian insurgents again took up arms in the fight for national independence.

== Religion and culture ==
=== Christianity and paganism ===
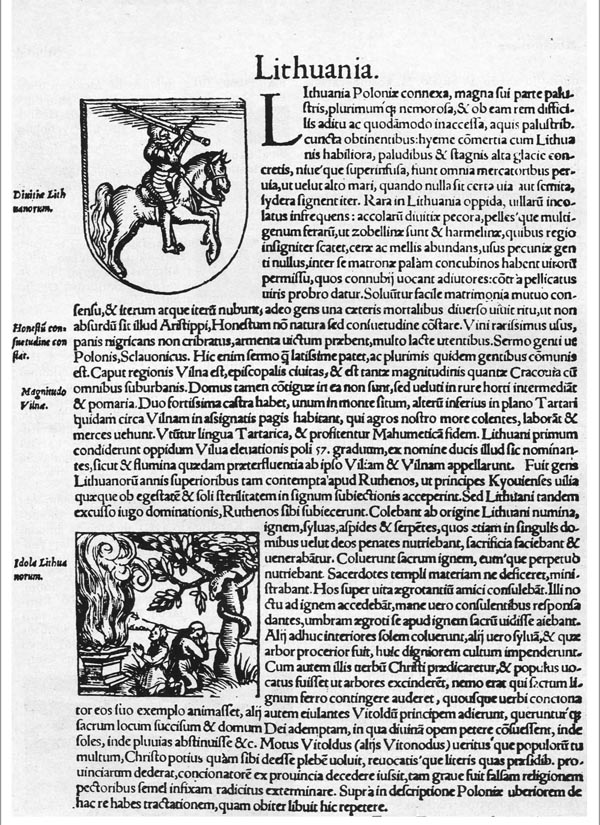
A facsimile of a page from Sebastian Münster atlas Cosmographia universalis (first edition 1544), describing the Grand Duchy of Lithuania in 1544

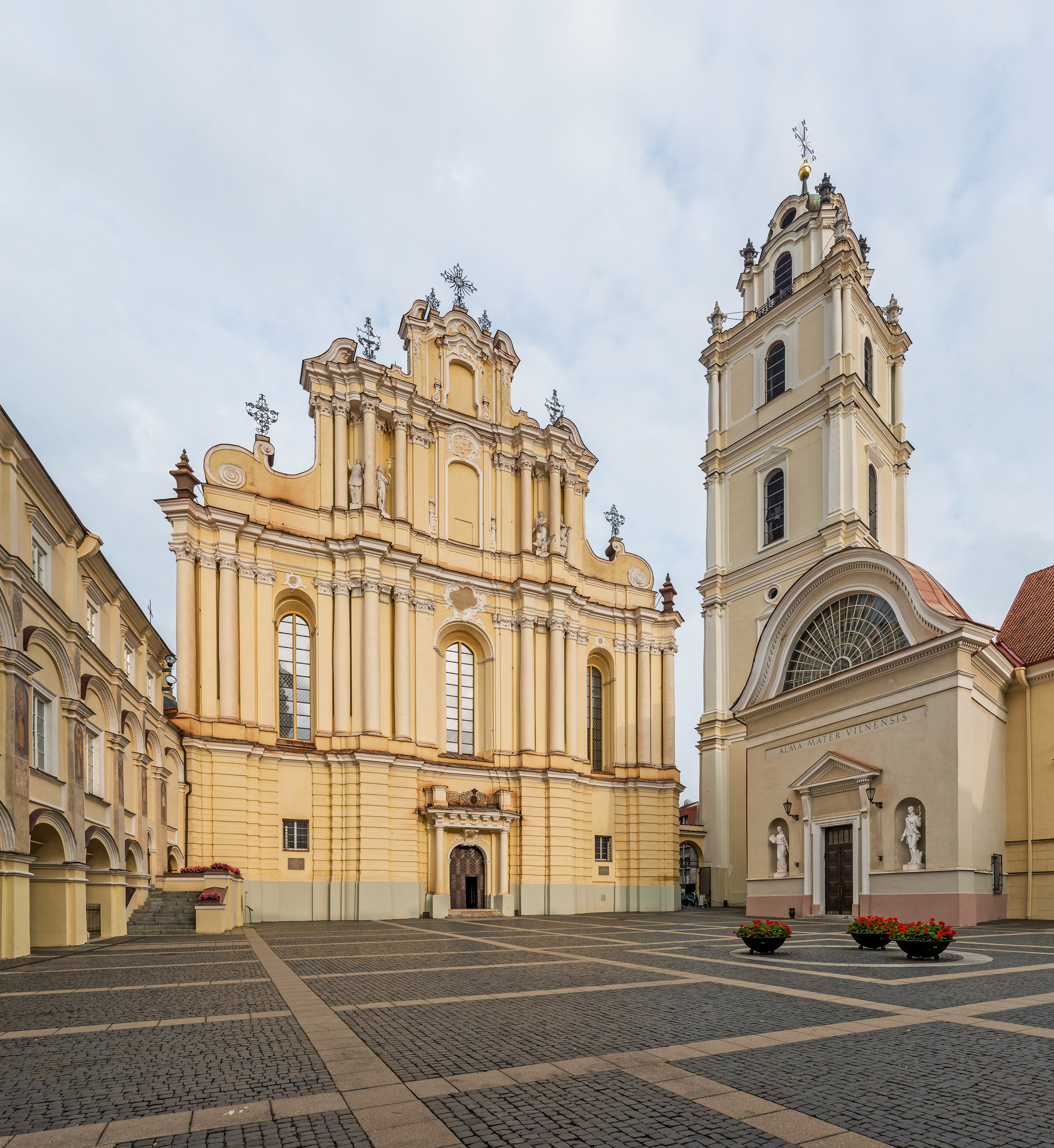
Church of St. Johns in Vilnius. Example of Vilnian Baroque style

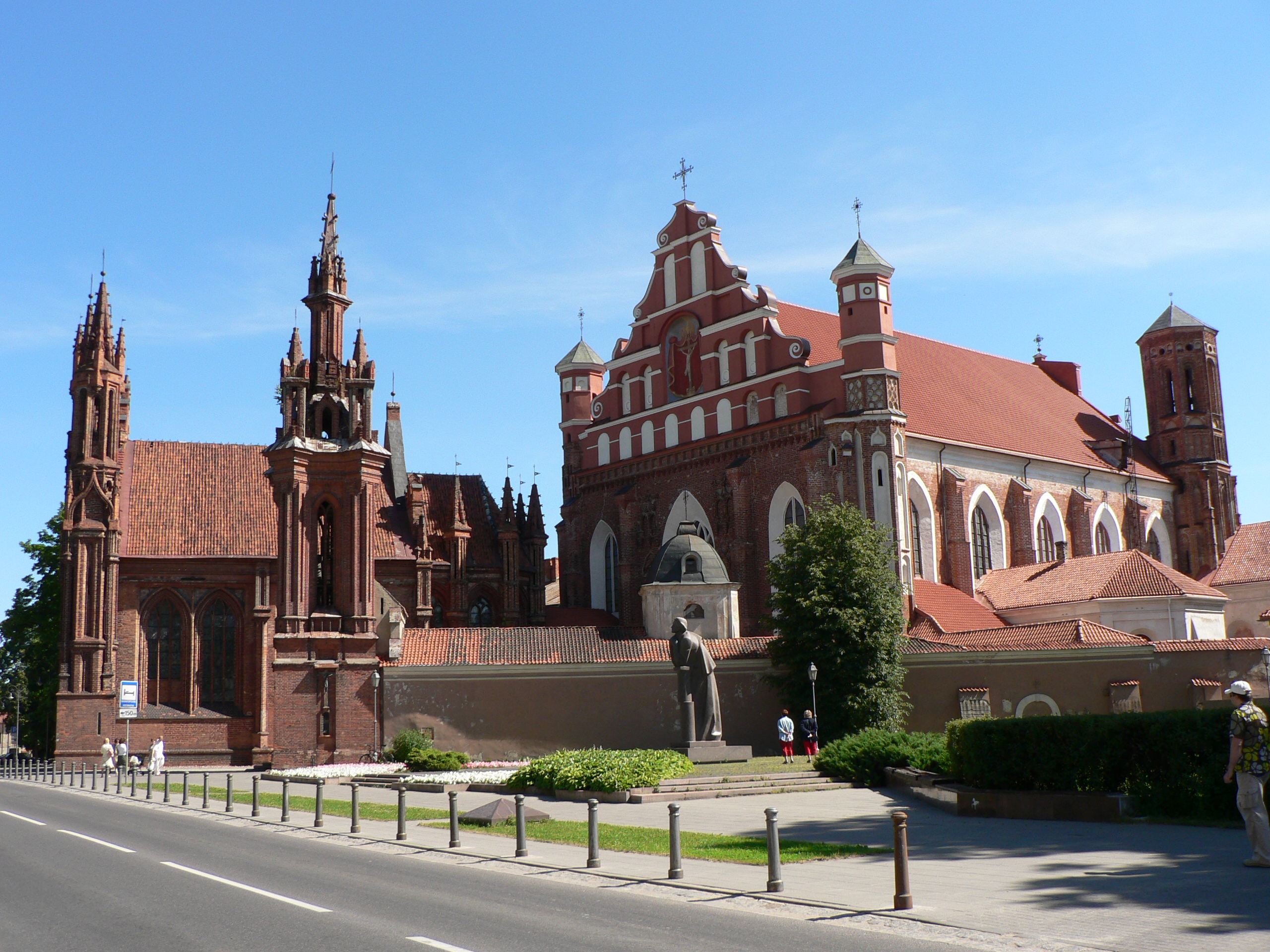
St. Anne's Church and the church of the Bernardine Monastery in Vilnius. Two examples of Gothic architecture.

After the baptism in 1252 and coronation of King Mindaugas in 1253, Lithuania was recognized as a Christian state until 1260, when Mindaugas supported an uprising in Courland and (according to the German order) renounced Christianity. Up until 1387, Lithuanian nobles professed their own religion, which was polytheistic. Ethnic Lithuanians were very dedicated to their faith. The pagan beliefs needed to be deeply entrenched to survive strong pressure from missionaries and foreign powers. Until the 17th century, there were relics of old faith reported by counter-reformation active Jesuit priests, like feeding žaltys with milk or bringing food to graves of ancestors. The lands of modern-day Belarus and Ukraine, as well as local dukes (princes) in these regions, were firmly Orthodox Christian (Greek Catholic after the Union of Brest), though. While pagan beliefs in Lithuania were strong enough to survive centuries of pressure from military orders and missionaries, they did eventually succumb. A separate Eastern Orthodox metropolitan eparchy was created sometime between 1315 and 1317 by the Constantinople Patriarch John XIII. Following the Galicia–Volhynia Wars which divided the Kingdom of Galicia–Volhynia between the Grand Duchy of Lithuania and the Kingdom of Poland, in 1355 the Halych metropoly was liquidated and its eparchies transferred to the metropoles of Lithuania and Volhynia.

In 1387, Lithuania converted to Catholicism, while most of the Ruthenian lands stayed Orthodox, however, on 22 February 1387, Supreme Duke Jogaila banned Catholics marriages with Orthodox, and demanded those Orthodox who previously married with the Catholics to convert to Catholicism. At one point, though, Pope Alexander VI reprimanded the Grand Duke for keeping non-Catholics as advisers. Consequently, only in 1563 did Grand Duke Sigismund II Augustus issue a privilege that equalized the rights of Orthodox and Catholics in Lithuania and abolished all previous restrictions on Orthodox. There was an effort to polarise Orthodox Christians after the Union of Brest in 1596, by which some Orthodox Christians acknowledged papal authority and Catholic catechism, but preserved their liturgy. The country also became one of the major centres of the Reformation.

In the second half of the 16th century, Calvinism spread in Lithuania, supported by the families of Radziwiłł, Chodkiewicz, Sapieha, Dorohostajski and others. By the 1580s the majority of the senators from Lithuania were Calvinist or Socinian Unitarians (Jan Kiszka).

In 1579, Stephen Báthory, King of Poland and Grand Duke of Lithuania, founded Vilnius University, one of the oldest universities in Northern Europe. Due to the work of the Jesuits during the Counter-Reformation the university soon developed into one of the most important scientific and cultural centres of the region and the most notable scientific centre of the Grand Duchy of Lithuania. The work of the Jesuits as well as conversions from among the Lithuanian senatorial families turned the tide and by the 1670s Calvinism lost its former importance though it still retained some influence among the ethnically Lithuanian peasants and some middle nobility.

=== Islam ===
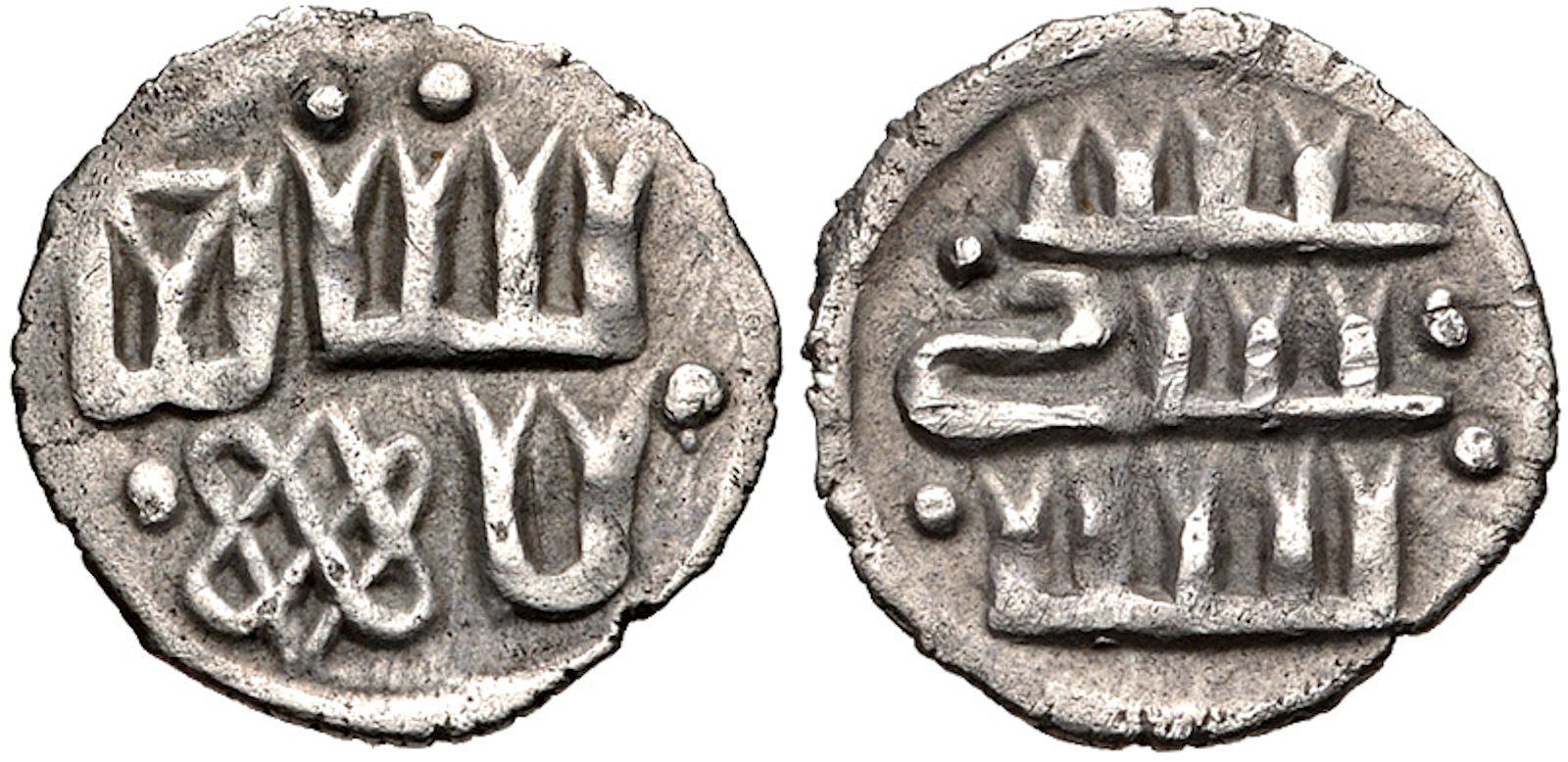
Coin of the Principality of Kiev, around the time of Vladimir Olgerdovich (1362–1394), imitating a Gulistan mint dang of Golden Horde ruler Jani Beg (Jambek). Uncertain Kiev region mint. Pseudo-Arabic legend.

Islam in Lithuania, unlike many other northern and western European countries, has a long history starting from 14th century. Small groups of Muslim Lipka Tatars migrated to ethnically Lithuanian lands, mainly under the rule of Grand Duke Vytautas (early 15th century). In Lithuania, unlike many other European societies at the time, there was religious freedom. Lithuanian Tatars were allowed to settle in certain places, such as Trakai and Kaunas. Keturiasdešimt Totorių is one of the oldest Tatar settlements in the Grand Duchy of Lithuania. After a successful military campaign of the Crimean Peninsula in 1397, Vytautas brought the first Crimean Tatar prisoners of war to Trakai and various places in the Duchy of Trakai, including localities near Vokė river just south of Vilnius. The first mosque in this village was mentioned for the first time in 1558. There were 42 Tatar families in the village in 1630.

== Languages ==
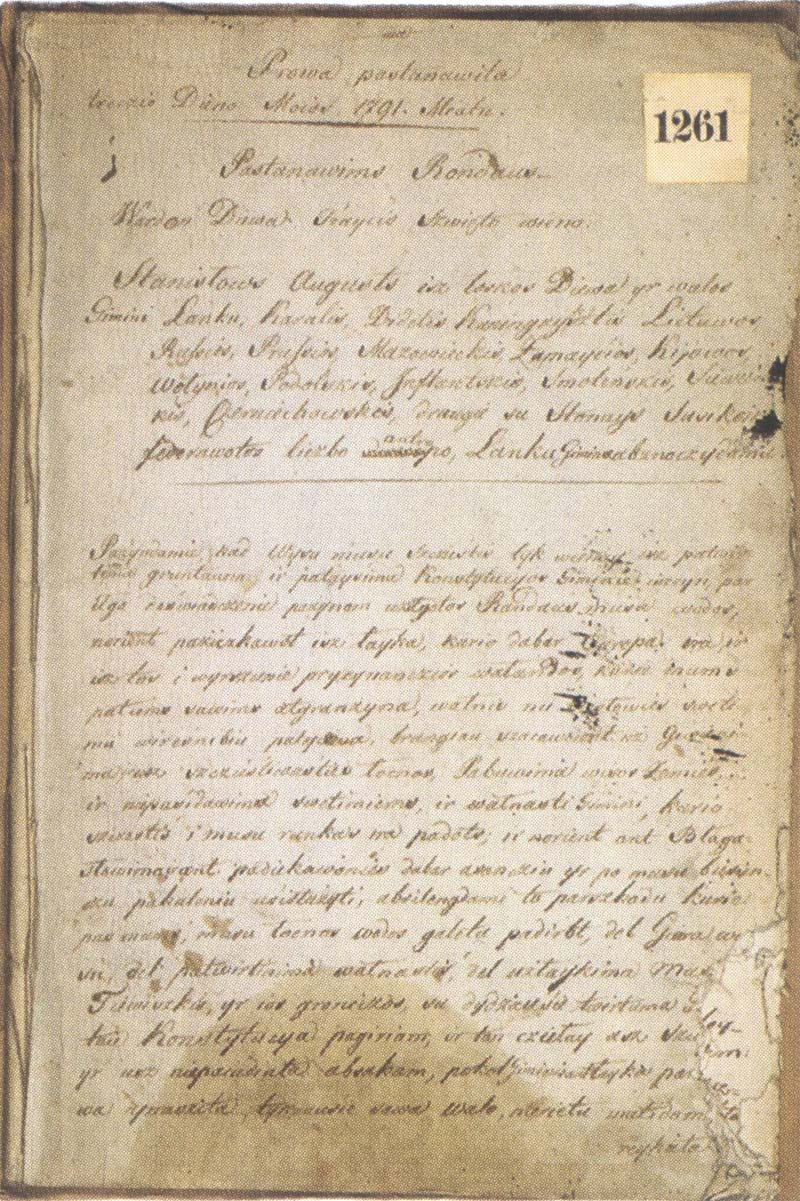
Constitution of 3 May, one of the first official state documents issued in both Polish and Lithuanian, Lithuanian edition

=== Linguistic groups ===
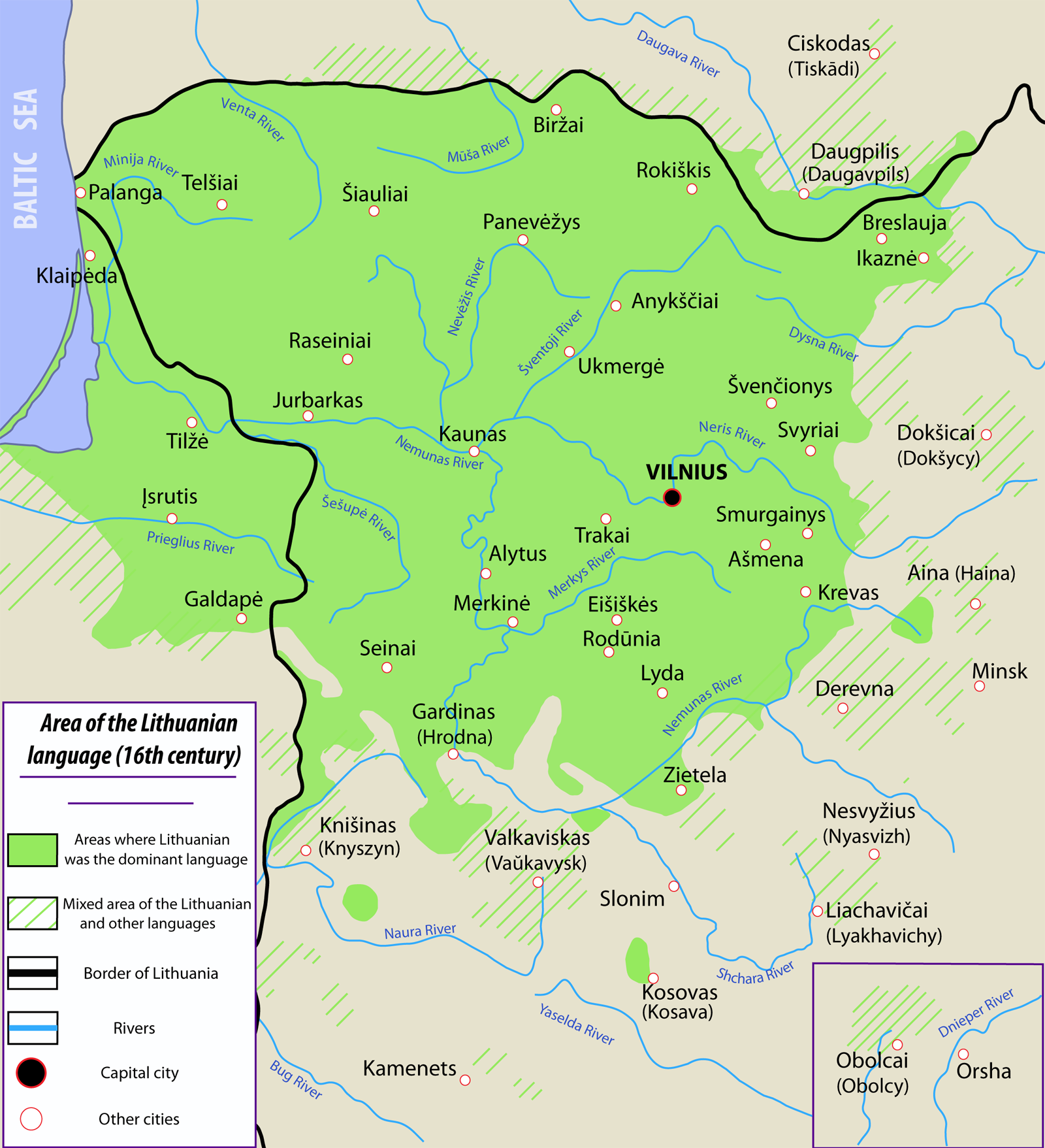
Area where according to Zigmas Zinkevičius the Lithuanian language was predominantly spoken in the 16th century

The majority of inhabitants of Lithuania proper, which included the voivodeships of Vilnius, Trakai and Samogitia, spoke Lithuanian. These areas remained almost wholly Lithuanian-speaking, both among the common people and the ruling nobility. Despite its frequent oral use, Lithuanian did not begin to be used in writing until the 16th century.

Ruthenians, ancestors of modern Belarusians and Ukrainians, living in the eastern and southern lands of the Grand Duchy spoke the Ruthenian language. The Ruthenian language had an old writing tradition. The language of the Orthodox Church was Old Church Slavonic, while official documents used the so-called Chancery Ruthenian, close to but not identical to the spoken language, which over time absorbed many Lithuanian and Polish words.

Some Poles (mainly burghers, clergy, merchants, and szlachta) moved to Lithuania, although this migration was small-scale. After the Union of Lublin, this movement significantly increased. Polish was adopted also gradually by the local inhabitants. Already in early 16th century, Polish became the Lithuanian magnates' first language. The following century it was adopted by the Lithuanian nobility in general. The Polish language also penetrated other social strata: the clergy, the townspeople, and even the peasants. Since the 16th century, Polish was used much more often than other languages for writing. Polish finally became the Commonwealth's official chancellery language in 1697.

Other important ethnic groups throughout the Grand Duchy of Lithuania were Jews. Jews spoke mainly in the eastern dialect of Yiddish. The Lithuanian Tatars used a language of Kipchak origin that was full of borrowings from Turkish and Arabic. It ceased to be used in the 16th century, and was replaced by Ruthenian and Polish, written in the Arabic alphabet. Brought in 1397 from Crimea, Karaites used a dialect of West Karaite language, while Hebrew was used for religious purposes.

In addition, Duchy of Livonia, which had been politically connected to the Grand Duchy since the mid-16th century, was inhabited by Latgalians who spoke a dialect of the Latvian language. Inhabiting the towns, mainly in Duchy of Livonia, the mostly Protestant Germans used a local variety of German called Baltendeutsch. Prussian and Yotvingians refugees, pushed out by the Teutonic Knights, also found their footing in the Grand Duchy. Similarly, Russian Old Believers emigrated to Lithuanian lands in the 17th century.

=== Languages of administration ===
Title of the Statute of Grand Duchy of Lithuania written in the Ruthenian language, 1588

The Grand Duchy's linguistic and ethnic situation, as well as the fusion of Lithuanian and Ruthenian elements in its culture, became the trigger for a long-running debate among historians from Lithuania, Belarus and Ukraine over whether the state was essentially Lithuanian or Ruthenian-Lithuanian, in which the more advanced Ruthenian culture played a central role.

Before the Lithuanian expansion into the Ruthenian lands, Lithuanian was the only language of public life. However, the conquests, already initiated by Mindaugas in 13th century, began the process of fusing Ruthenian and Lithuanian culture and, in the absence of its own writing tradition, adopting Ruthenian as the language of administration and written communication. From at least the time of Vytautas, but probably much earlier, the language of internal administration was Chancery Ruthenian, a language similar to, but not the same as, the spoken language used by Ruthenians living in the Grand Duchy of Lithuania. As for the correspondences with foreign courts the grand ducal chancellery prepared it in the language appropriate to the recipient: Latin for the correspondence with the West, German with the Teutonic Order and Chancery Ruthenian with the East Slavic and Tatar rulers.

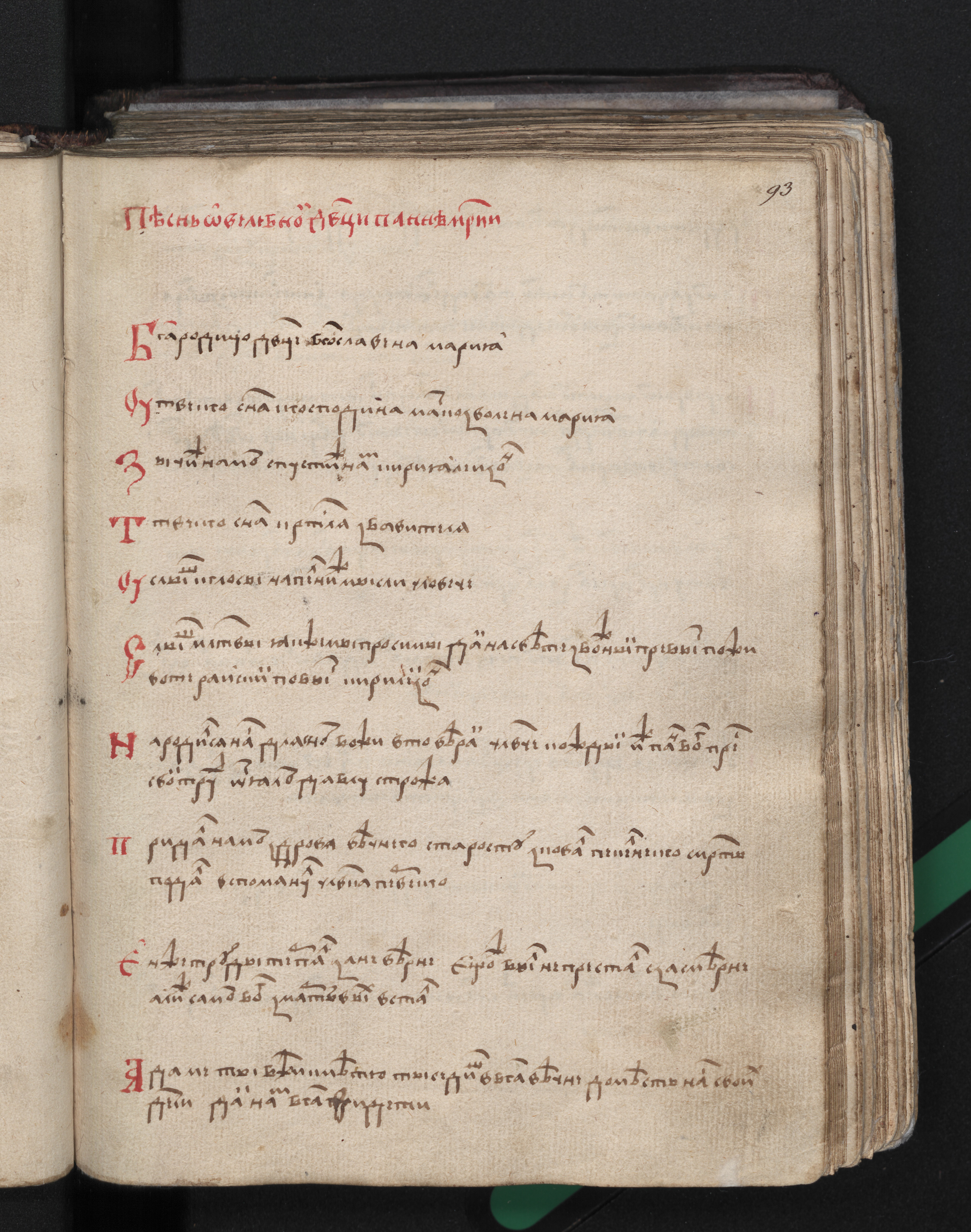
A page from the First Statute of Lithuania (1529), written in the Ruthenian (Old Belarusian) language.

The Grand Duke of Lithuania, Alexander Jagiellon, specified that the Roman Catholic priests in these 28 churches must know the Lithuanian language, according to his letter of 18 September 1501, which was addressed to the Bishop of Vilnius Albertas.

The language used at court continued to be Lithuanian until the mid-16th century, the other being Ruthenian; later, both languages began to be replaced by Polish. Ruthenian culture dominated the courts of the Gediminid princes since the 14th century, especially those ruling directly over Ruthenian subjects. Grand Duke Jogaila was most likely bilingual, knowing and speaking Lithuanian and Ruthenian, and was able to communicate in the Samogitian dialect of the Lithuanian language. The Lithuanian language was still strongly present at the Vilnius court of Casimir Jagiellon, who had to learn it when he assumed power in the Grand Duchy in 1444. Casimir's assumption of power in Poland in 1447 marked the end of the existence of a separate court in Vilnius (it later existed only in years 1492–1496 and 1544–1548). Many Lithuanians and Ruthenian nobles joined the court in Kraków, they learned Polish language over time. Casimir was the last Grand Duke to know the Lithuanian language. From 1500, the elite of the Lithuanian state rapidly adopted the Polish language.

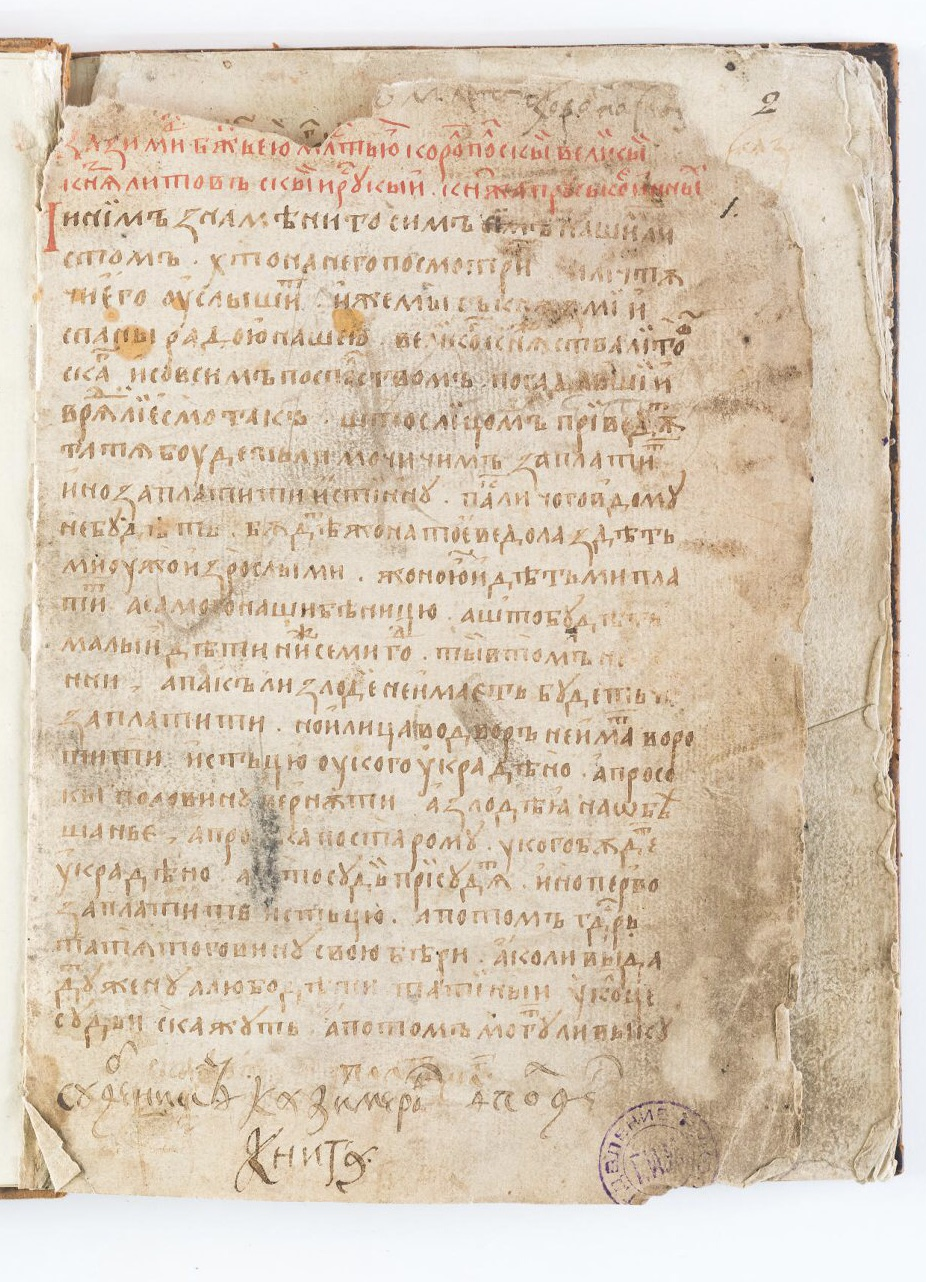
A page from Casimir's Code (Sudebnik of 1468), written in the Ruthenian language.

The process of moving away from Ruthenian to Polish in administration was soon apparent. The first were the nobles of Podlachia, who adopted Polish laws as early as the 1440s, and repeatedly demanded that official documents be written in Polish, since they no longer knew Ruthenian. The political reforms of 1564–1566 established sejmiks, local land courts, appellate courts modelled on Polish system, through which the Polish language flowed into Lithuania. The first codification of Lithuanian laws, the Statute of Lithuania, was issued in Chancery Ruthenian (1529), but was quickly translated into Latin (1530) and Polish (1532). Court Chancellor of the Grand Duchy of Lithuania Lew Sapieha noted in the preface of the Third Statute of Lithuania (1588) that all state documents to be written exclusively in Ruthenian. Despite this, after the Polish translation of the statute was published in 1614, it was not reissued in Ruthenian ever again. Polish was increasingly used in official documents, especially after the Union of Lublin. Finally, in 1697, the Sejm, as part of the equalization of law between Lithuania and Poland, confirmed that only the Polish language was to be used in administration in Lithuania, although Ruthenian continued to be used on a few official documents until the second half of the 18th century.

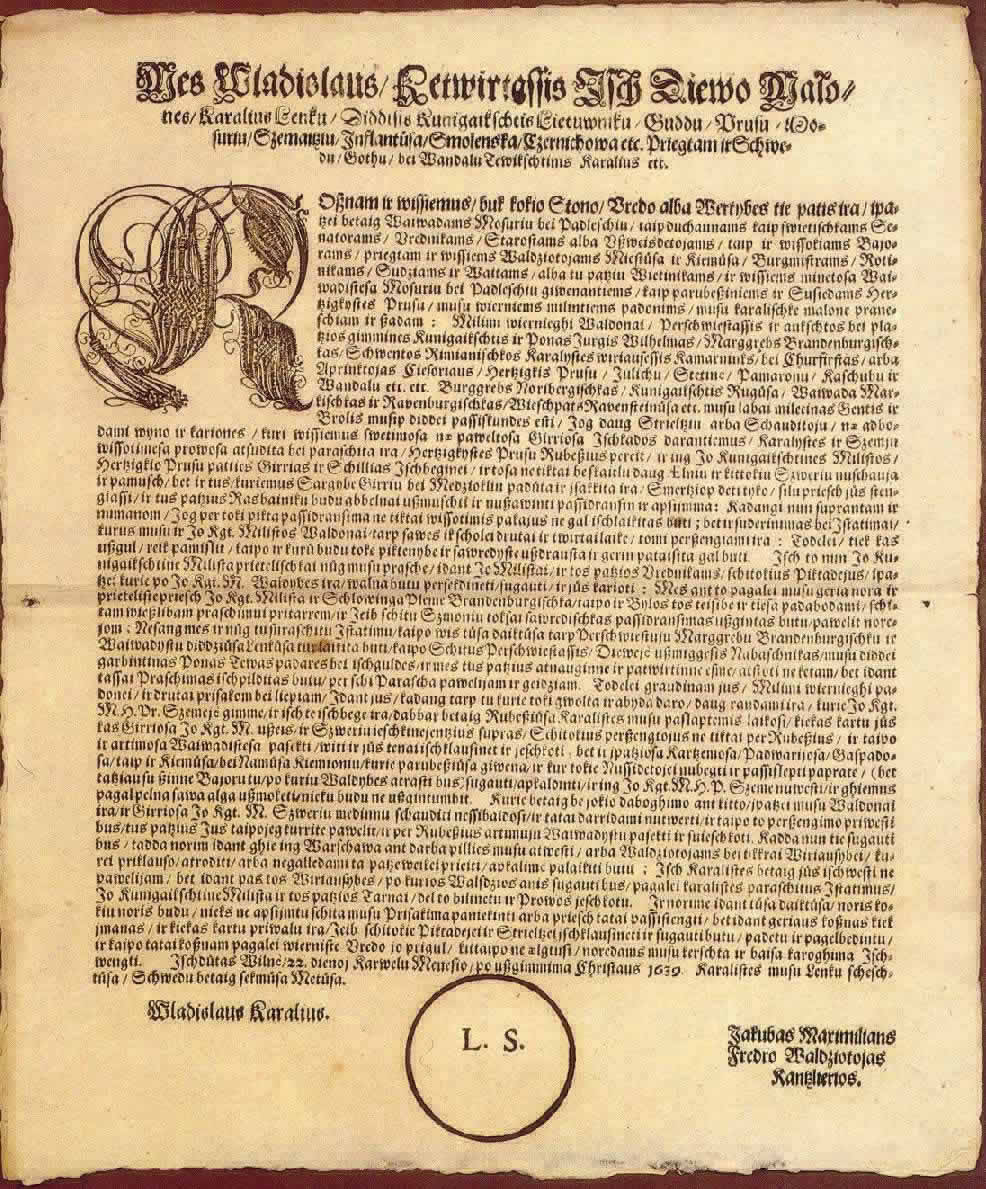
King Władysław IV's universal of March 22, 1639 forbidding his subjects to hunt on the territory of Ducal Prussia. The universal was translated into Old Lithuanian at the Prussian chancellery.

After the baptism, the use of Latin, the main language of learning and writing in Western Europe, also spread in Lithuania as a language of official documents. In the 14th–16th centuries it functioned as the second language of the grand ducal chancellery, though it was used less frequently than Ruthenian in internal administration. This development coincided with the mid-15th-century spread of the legend about the Roman origin of the Lithuanian nobility (the Palemon myth) and the idea of a special affinity between Lithuanian and Latin. These notions led some mid-16th-century intellectuals to advocate replacing Ruthenian with Latin, which they regarded as the "native" language of Lithuanians.

Despite the emergence of Lithuanian-language literature in the 16th century, Lithuanian did not obtain the status of a chancellery language in the Grand Duchy until the late 18th century. This contrasted with neighboring Prussia, where issuing official documents in Lithuanian, especially those addressed to Lithuanian-speaking subjects, became customary as early as the 16th century. The Prussian chancellery even translated into Lithuanian two royal universals of 1639 and 1641, originally written in Latin for King Władysław IV, which forbade subjects of the Commonwealth from crossing into Prussia (then a Polish fief). In the Grand Duchy of Lithuania, the first official document in Lithuanian was a translation of the Polish text of the Constitution of May 3, issued in 1791. Several further documents appeared in Lithuanian during the Kościuszko Uprising. In everyday practice, however, Lithuanian was spoken in administrative offices and used by officials when dealing with residents who could not communicate in other languages. The Vilnius city charter of 18 November 1551 required that court summonses and verdicts be announced in Lithuanian, Polish, and Ruthenian; a similar charter was issued earlier in Kaunas in 1540.

== Demographics ==
In 1260, the Grand Duchy of Lithuania was the land of Lithuania, and ethnic Lithuanians formed the majority (68%) of its 400,000 people. With the acquisition of new Ruthenian territories, in 1340 this portion decreased to 30%. By the time of the largest expansion towards Rus' lands, which came at the end of the 13th and during the 14th century, the territory of the Grand Duchy of Lithuania was 800 to 930 thousand km^{2}, just 10% to 14% of which was ethnically Lithuanian.

On 6 May 1434, Grand Duke Sigismund Kęstutaitis released his privilege which tied the Orthodox and Catholic Lithuanian nobles rights in order to attract the Slavic nobles of the eastern regions of the Grand Duchy of Lithuania who supported the former Grand Duke Švitrigaila.

An estimate of the population in the territory of Poland and Grand Duchy of Lithuania together gives a population at 7.5 million for 1493, breaking them down by ethnicity at 3.75 million Ruthenians (ethnic Ukrainians, Belarusians), 3.25 million Poles and 0.5 million Lithuanians. With the Union of Lublin, 1569, Lithuanian Grand Duchy lost large part of lands to the Polish Crown.

According to an analysis of the tax registers in 1572, Lithuania proper had 850,000 residents of which 680,000 were Lithuanians.

In the mid and late 17th century, due to Russian and Swedish invasions, there was much devastation and population loss on throughout the Grand Duchy of Lithuania, including ethnic Lithuanian population in Vilnius surroundings. Besides devastation, the Ruthenian population declined proportionally after the territorial losses to Russian Empire. By 1770 there were about 4.84 million inhabitants in the territory of 320 thousand km^{2}, the biggest part of whom were inhabitants of Ruthenia and about 1.39 million or 29% – of ethnic Lithuania. During the following decades, the population decreased in a result of partitions.

== Legacy ==
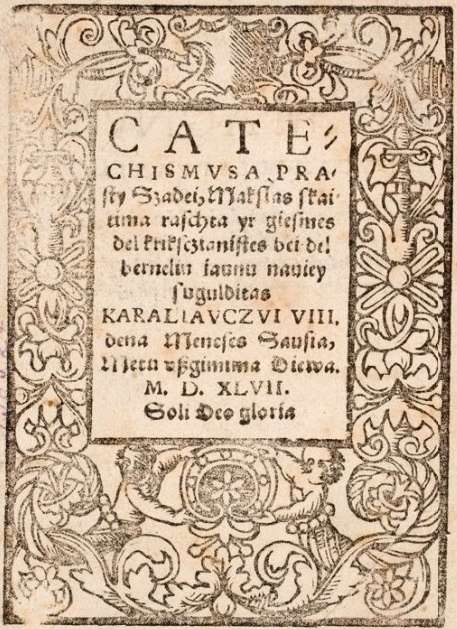
The first printed book in Lithuanian Catechism of Martynas Mažvydas by Martynas Mažvydas

Prussian tribes (of Baltic origin) were the subject of Polish expansion, which was largely unsuccessful, so Duke Konrad of Masovia invited the Teutonic Knights to settle near the Prussian area of settlement. The fighting between Prussians and the Teutonic Knights gave the more distant Lithuanian tribes time to unite. Because of strong enemies in the south and north, the newly formed Lithuanian state concentrated most of its military and diplomatic efforts on expansion eastward.

The rest of the former Ruthenian lands were conquered by the Grand Duchy of Lithuania. Some other lands in Ukraine were vassalized by Lithuania later. The subjugation of Eastern Slavs by two powers created substantial differences between them that persist to this day. While there were certainly substantial regional differences in Kievan Rus', it was the Lithuanian annexation of much of southern and western Ruthenia that led to the permanent division between Ukrainians, Belarusians, and Russians, and even four Grand Dukes of Lithuania are appeared on the Millennium of Russia monument.

In the 19th century, the romantic references to the times of the Grand Duchy of Lithuania were an inspiration and a substantial part of both the Lithuanian and Belarusian national revival movements and Romanticism in Poland.

Notwithstanding the above, Lithuania was a kingdom under Mindaugas, who was crowned by the authority of Pope Innocent IV in 1253. Vytenis, Gediminas and Vytautas the Great also assumed the title of King, although uncrowned by the Pope. A failed attempt was made in 1918 to revive the Kingdom under a German Prince, Wilhelm Karl, Duke of Urach, who would have reigned as Mindaugas II of Lithuania.

In the first half of the 20th century, the memory of the multiethnic history of the Grand Duchy was revived by the people connected with the Krajowcy movement, such as Ludwik Abramowicz, Konstancja Skirmuntt, Michał Pius Römer, Juozapas Albinas Herbačiauskas, Józef Mackiewicz and Stanisław Mackiewicz. This feeling was expressed in poetry by Czesław Miłosz.

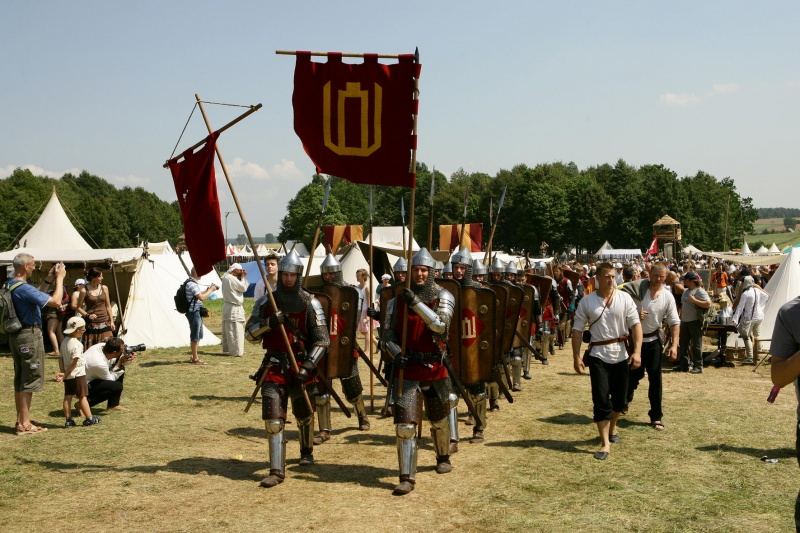
Medieval-like Lithuanian soldiers during the historical reenactment of the Battle of Grunwald in 2009

The Act of Independence of Lithuania, signed by the Council of Lithuania on February 16, 1918, proclaimed that "the Council of Lithuania, as the sole representative of the Lithuanian nation, based on the recognized right to national self-determination, and on the Vilnius Conference's resolution of September 18–23, 1917, proclaims the restoration of the independent state of Lithuania, founded on democratic principles, with Vilnius as its capital, and declares the termination of all state ties which formerly bound this State to other nations". In the preamble of the most recent Constitution of Lithuania, adopted during the 1992 Lithuanian constitutional referendum, the continuity of Lithuanian statehood is also stressed.

Pseudoscientific theory of litvinism was developed since the 1990s.

Famous Lithuanian sports clubs BC Žalgiris and FK Žalgiris as well the largest indoor arena in Lithuania are named after the Battle of Grunwald (Žalgirio mūšis).

According to the 10th article of the Law on the State Flag and Other Flags of the Republic of Lithuania (Lithuanian: Lietuvos Respublikos valstybės vėliavos ir kitų vėliavų įstatymas), adopted by the Seimas, the historical Lithuanian state flag (with horseback knight on a red field, which initial design dates back to the reign of Grand Duke Vytautas the Great) must be constantly raised over the most important governmental buildings (e.g. Seimas Palace, Government of Lithuania and its ministries, Lithuanian courts, municipal council buildings) and significant historical buildings (e.g. Palace of the Grand Dukes of Lithuania, Trakai Island Castle), also in Kernavė and in the site of the Senieji Trakai Castle.

== See also ==
- History of Lithuania
- History of Belarus
- History of Ukraine
- List of cities in the Grand Duchy of Lithuania
- List of heads of state of Lithuania
- Grand Duchy of Lithuania and Belarus (1918)
- Acts of the Lithuanian-Ruthenian State

== Sources ==
- Grand Duchy of Lithuania: Encyclopedia in Three Volumes, Vol. I, 2nd ed., 2007. 688 pages, illustrated, ISBN 985-11-0314-4
- Grand Duchy of Lithuania: Encyclopedia in Three Volumes, Vol. II, 2nd ed., 2007. 792 pages, illustrated, ISBN 985-11-0378-0
- Grand Duchy of Lithuania: Encyclopedia in Three Volumes, Vol. III, 2010. 696 pages, illustrated, ISBN 978-985-11-0487-7
- Norman Davies. God's Playground. Columbia University Press; 2nd ed., (2002), ISBN 0-231-12817-7.
- Alan V. Murray. Crusade and Conversion on the Baltic Frontier 1150–1500 (Cambridge Studies in Medieval Life and Thought: Fourth Series). Routledge, 2001. ISBN 978-0754603252.
- Alan V. Murray. The Clash of Cultures on the Medieval Baltic Frontier Routledge, 2016. ISBN 978-0754664833.
- Zenonas Norkus. An Unproclaimed Empire: The Grand Duchy of Lithuania: From the Viewpoint of Comparative Historical Sociology of Empires, Routledge, 2017, 426 p. ISBN 978-1138281547.
- A. Dubonis, D. Antanavičius, R. Ragauskiene, R. Šmigelskytė-Štukienė. The Lithuanian Metrica : History and Research. Academic Studies Press. Brighton & United States, 2020. ISBN 978-1644693100
- Jūratė Kiaupienė. Between Rome and Byzantium: The Golden Age of the Grand Duchy of Lithuania's Political Culture. Second half of the fifteenth century to first half of the seventeenth century. Academic Studies Press. Brighton & United States, 2020. ISBN 978-1644691465
- Bednarczuk, Leszek (2013). "Languages in contact and conflict on the territory of the Grand Duchy of Lithuania (GDL)". Acta Baltico-Slavica. 37.
- Drungila, Jonas (2019). Erelis lokio guolyje. Lenkų bajorai Žemaitijoje XVI–XVIII a.: migracija, kalba, atmintis [An eagle in a bear's bed. Polish nobility in Samogitia in the 16th–18th centuries: migration, language, memory] (in Lithuanian). Vilnius: Lithuanian Institute of History Press. ISBN 978-609-8183-65-8.
- Dubonis, Artūras (2002). "Lietuvių kalba: poreikis ir vartojimo mastai : XV a. antra pusė – XVI a. pirma pusė". Naujasis židinys–Aidai. 9–10: 473–478.
- Dubonis, Artūras (2016). "The Prestige and decline of the official (state) language in the Grand Duchy of Lithuania (fifteenth–sixteenth century): problems in Belarusian historiography". Lithuanian Historical Studies. 20: 1–30. doi:10.30965/25386565-02001002.
- Dziarnovič, Alieh (2013). "Lithuanian Language in the Grand Duchy of Lithuania: between Function and Status". Belarusian Political Science Review. 2.
- Frost, Robert (2015). The Oxford History of Poland–Lithuania. Vol. I: The Making of the Polish–Lithuanian Union, 1385–1569. Oxford University Press. ISBN 978-0-19-820869-3.
- Gudavičius, Edvardas (2006). "Rusini (Gudowie)" [Ruthenians (Gudais)]. In Ališauskas, Vytautas; Jovaiša, Liudas; Paknys, Mindaugas; Petrauskas, Rimvydas; Raila, Eligijus (eds.). Kultura Wielkiego Księstwa Litewskiego. Analizy i obrazy. Kraków. pp. 544–560.
- Kiaupa, Zigmantas; Kiaupienė, Jūratė; Kuncevičius, Albinas (2000). The history of Lithuania before 1795. Vilnius: Lithuanian Institute of History. ISBN 9789986810131.
- Lebedys, Jurgis (1976). "Lietuvių kalba XVII–XVIII a. viešajame gyvenime" [Lithuanian language in public life in the XVII–XVIII centuries]. Mokslas (in Lithuanian).
- Rachuba, Andrzej (2010). "Litwini". In Kopczyński, Michał; Tygielski, Wojciech (eds.). Pod wspólnym niebem. Narody dawnej Rzeczypospolitej [Under a Common Sky. Peoples of the former Commonwealth] (in Polish). Warsaw. ISBN 978-83-11-11724-2.
- Rowell, Stephen Christopher (1994). Lithuania Ascending: A Pagan Empire within East-Central Europe, 1295–1345. Cambridge Studies in Medieval Life and Thought: Fourth Series. Cambridge University Press. ISBN 978-1-107-65876-9.
- Rowell, Stephen Christopher; Baronas, Darius (2015). The Conversion of Lithuania. From Pagan Barbarians to Late Medieval Christians. Vilnius: Institute of Lithuanian Literature and Folklore. ISBN 978-609-425-152-8.
- Stone, Daniel Z. (2001). The Polish–Lithuanian State, 1386–1795. University of Washington Press. ISBN 978-0-295-80362-3.
- Trimonienė, Rita (2006). "Polonizacja" [Polonization]. In Ališauskas, Vytautas; Jovaiša, Liudas; Paknys, Mindaugas; Petrauskas, Rimvydas; Raila, Eligijus (eds.). Kultura Wielkiego Księstwa Litewskiego. Analizy i obrazy. Kraków. pp. 544–560.
- Walczak, Bogdan (2019). "Język litewski w Wielkim Księstwie Litewskim" [Lithuanian language in the Grand Duchy of Lithuania]. Scripta Neophilologica Posnaniensia. 18 (18): 231–237. doi:10.14746/snp.2018.18.20.
- Wiemer, Björn (2003). "Dialect and language contacts on the territory of the Grand Duchy of Lithuania from the 15th century until 1939". In Braunmüller, Kurt; Ferraresi, Gisella (eds.). Aspects of Multilingualism in European Language History. John Benjamins. pp. 105–144. ISBN 90-272-1922-2.
- Wisner, Henryk (2008). Rzeczpospolita Wazów. Sławne Państwo, Wielkie Księstwo Litewskie [The Commonwealth of the Vasas. The Illustrious State, the Grand Duchy of Lithuania] (in Polish). Vol. 3. Warsaw: Neriton.
- Young, Francis (2024). Poetry and Nation-Building in the Grand Duchy of Lithuania, Arc Humanities Press. ISBN 9781802702293
