= Demographics of Lithuania =

- Population pyramid of Lithuania in 2022
- Population: 2,830,546 (2022 est.)
- Growth rate: −1.04% (2022 est.)
- Birth rate: 9.26 births/1,000 population
- Death rate: 15.12 deaths/1,000 population
- Life expectancy: 75.78 years
  - male: 70.42 years
  - female: 81.44 years
- Fertility rate: 1.03 children (2025)
- Infant mortality: 3.63 deaths/1,000 live births
- Net migration rate: −4.54 migrant(s)/1,000 population

Age structure
- 0–14 years: 15.26%
- 15–64 years: 64.29%
- 65 and over: 20.45%

Sex ratio
- Total: 0.86 male(s)/female
- At birth: 1.06 male(s)/female
- 65 and over: 0.45 male(s)/female

Nationality
- Nationality: Lithuanian
- Major ethnic: Lithuanian (82.1%)
- Minor ethnic: Slavs (15.8%); Other (2.1%)

Language
- Official: Lithuanian (85.3%)

Demographic features of the population of Lithuania include population density, ethnicity, level of education, health, economic status, and religious affiliations.

The population of Lithuania increased after the end of World War II, reaching its apex in 1991 with 3.7 million, but started to decline after the Dissolution of the Soviet Union later that year, which negatively impacted the country. As social problems ensued after the dissolution of the Soviet Union, the birth rate decreased and the population fell sharply due to a relatively high death rate, mass emigration and a large increase of its suicide rate that made Lithuania one of the countries with the highest suicide rates in the world. This caused its population to drop below 3 million in 2012, losing over a quarter of its population in 30 years. As of today, Lithuania's fertility rate is one of the lowest in the world. However, while its suicide rate would remain the highest in the European Union, it dropped over time. Since 2019, more Lithuanian citizens have been returning to Lithuania than leaving, largely due to the rapidly improving quality of life and economic conditions in their homeland. There is an increasing trend among returning Lithuanian emigres to choose rural regions over urban ones.

== History ==
=== Prehistory ===
The earliest evidence of inhabitants in present-day Lithuania dates back to 10,000 BC. Between 3000 and 2000 BC, the people of the Corded Ware culture spread over a vast region of eastern Europe, between the Baltic Sea and the Vistula River in the West and the Moscow–Kursk line in the East. Merging with the indigenous peoples, they gave rise to the Balts, a distinct Indo-European ethnic group whose descendants are the present-day Lithuanian and Latvian nations and the former Old Prussians.

=== Grand Duchy of Lithuania ===
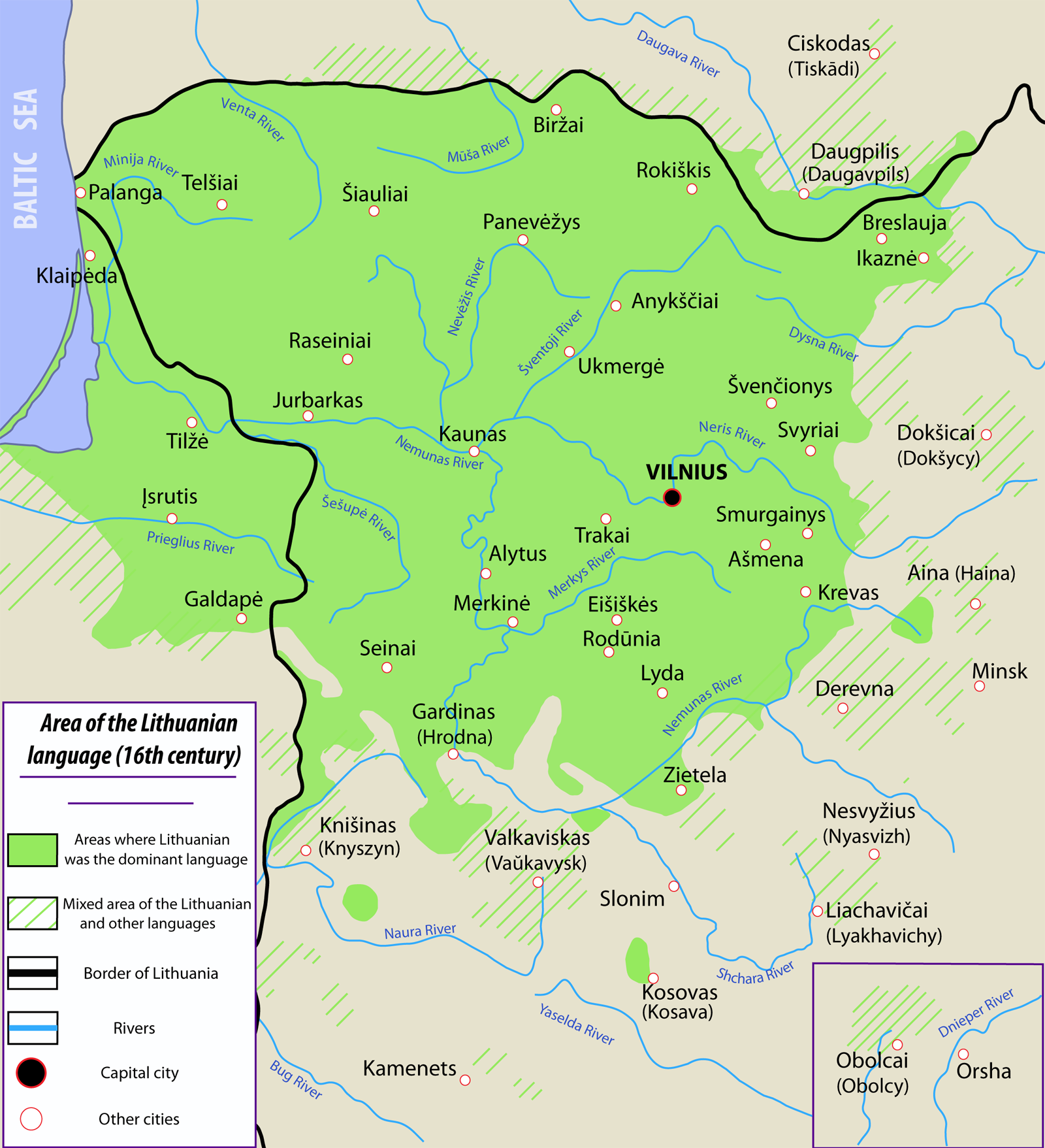
Area of the Lithuanian language in the 16th century

The name of Lithuania – Lithuanians – was first mentioned in 1009. Among its etymologies there are a derivation from the word Lietava, for a small river, a possible derivation from a word leičiai, but most probable is the name for union of Lithuanian ethnic tribes ('susilieti, lietis' means to unite and the word 'lietuva' means something which has been united).

The primary Lithuanian state, the Duchy of Lithuania, emerged in the territory of Lietuva, the ethnic homeland of Lithuanians. At the birth of the Grand Duchy of Lithuania (GDL), ethnic Lithuanians made up about 70% of the population. With the acquisition of new Ruthenian territories, this proportion decreased to 50% and later to 30%. By the time of the largest expansion towards Kievan Rus' lands, at the end of the 13th and during the 14th century, the territory of the GDL was about 800,000 km^{2} (310,000 sq mi), of which 10% was ethnically Lithuanian. The ethnic Lithuanian population is estimated to have been 420,000 out of 1.4 million in 1375 (the territory was about 700,000 km^{2} (270,000 sq mi)), and 550,000 out of 3.8 million in 1490 (territory: 850,000 km^{2}) In addition to the Ruthenians and Lithuanians, other significant ethnic groups throughout GDL were Jews and Tatars. The combined population of Poland and GDL in 1493 is estimated as 7.5 million, of whom 3.25 million were Poles, 3.75 million Ruthenians and 0.5 million Lithuanians.

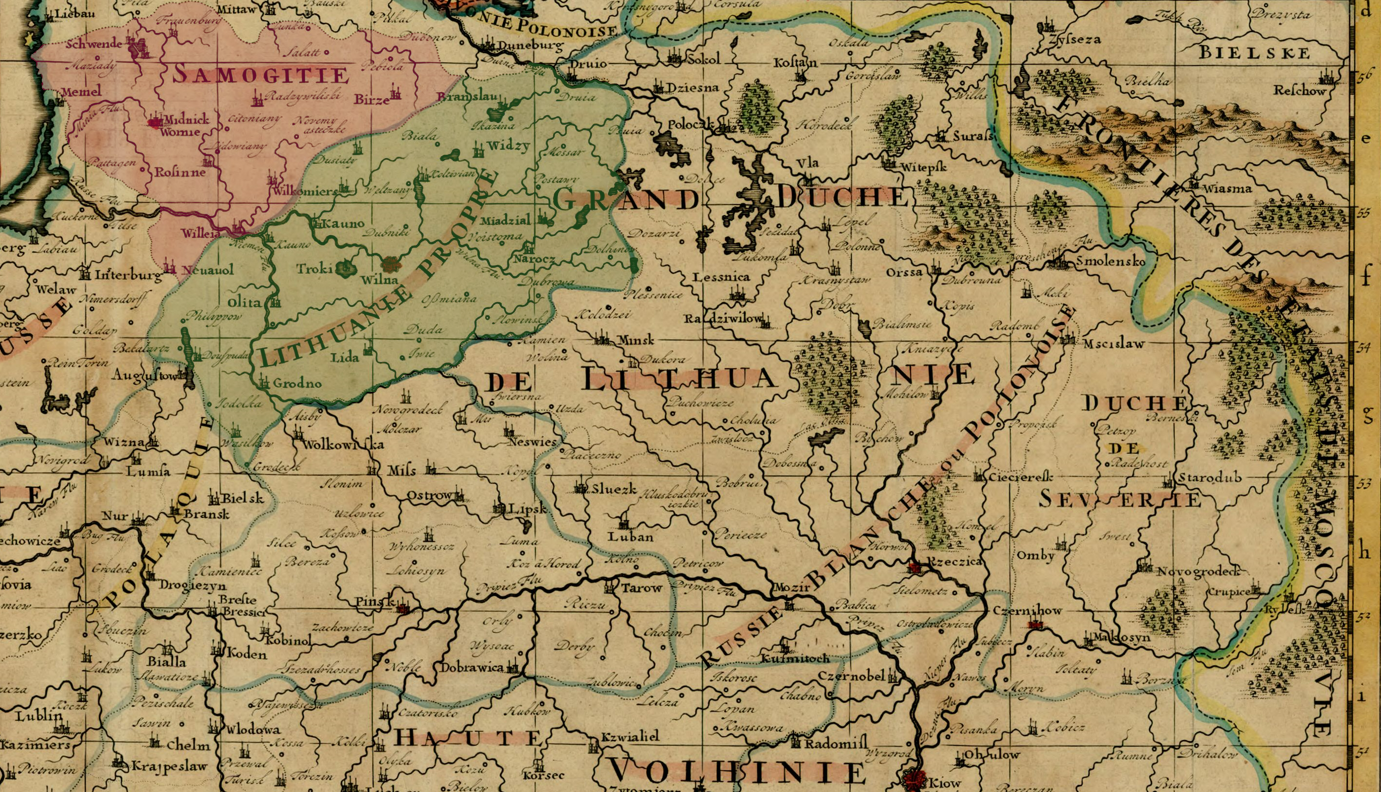
Samogitia (marked in pink) and Lithuania proper (marked in green) in a map of the Grand Duchy of Lithuania from 1712

With the Union of Lublin Lithuanian Grand Duchy lost large part of lands to the Polish Crown (see demographics of the Polish–Lithuanian Commonwealth). An ethnic Lithuanian proportion being about 1/4 in GDL after the Union of Lublin was held until the partitions. There was much devastation and population loss throughout the GDL in the mid and late 17th century, including the ethnic Lithuanian population in Vilnius voivodeship. Besides devastation, the Ruthenian population declined proportionally after the territorial losses to the Russian Empire. In 1770 there were about 4.84 million inhabitants in GDL, of which the largest ethnic group were Ruthenians, about 1.39 million – Lithuanians. The voivodeships with a majority ethnic Lithuanian population were Vilnius, Trakai and Samogitian voivodeships, and these three voivodeships comprised the political center of the state. In the southern angle of Trakai voivodeship and south-eastern part of Vilnius voivodeship there were also many Belarusians; in some of the south-eastern areas they were the major linguistic group.

The Ruthenian population formed a majority in GDL from the time of the GDL's expansion in the mid 14th century; and the adjective "Lithuanian", besides denoting ethnic Lithuanians, from early times denoted any inhabitant of GDL, including Slavs and Jews.

The Ruthenian language, corresponding to today's Belarusian and Ukrainian, is historiographically known as Chancery Slavonic, as the Chancery of Vilnius used it as its administrative language for the entire Grand Duchy of Lithuania. However, there are fewer extant documents written in this language than those written in Latin and Low German from the time of Vytautas. Later, Ruthenian became the main language of documentation and writing. In the years that followed, it was the main language of government until the introduction of Polish as the chancellery language of the Lithuanian–Polish Commonwealth in 1697; however there are also examples of documents written in Ruthenian from the second half of the 18th century. The Lithuanian language was used orally in Vilnius, Trakai and Samogitian voivodeships, and by small numbers of people elsewhere. At the royal court in Vilnius of Sigismund II Augustus, the last Grand Duke of Lithuania prior to the Union of Lublin, both Polish and Lithuanian were spoken equally widely.

=== Russian Empire ===
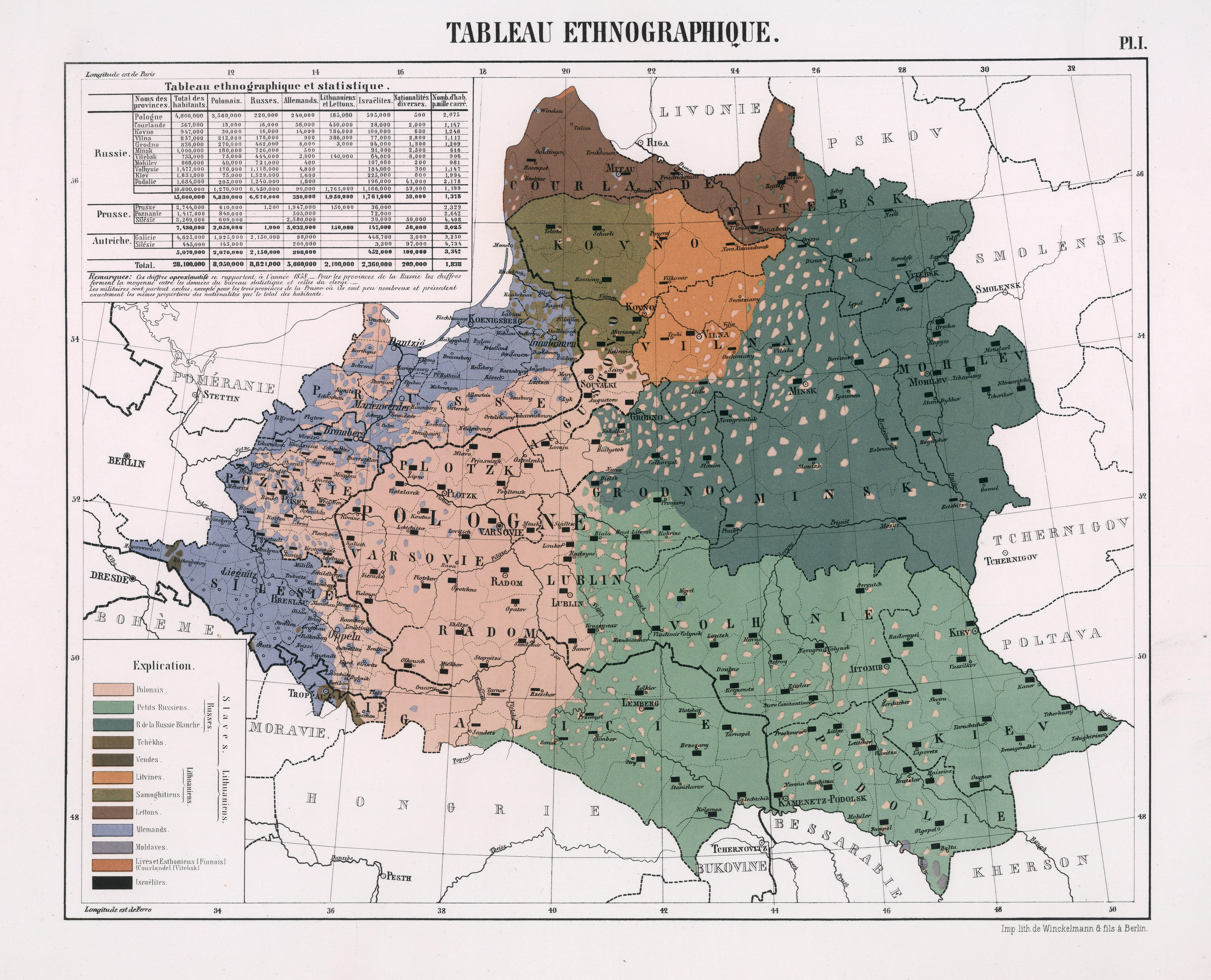
Distribution of Lithuanians: Samogitians (olive green) and Aukštaitians-Lithuanians (orange) in a 1863 ethnographic map of the governorates of the Russian Empire

After the Third Partition of the Polish–Lithuanian Commonwealth on October 24, 1795, between the Russian Empire, the Kingdom of Prussia and the Habsburg monarchy, the Commonwealth ceased to exist and Lithuania became a part of the Russian empire. After the abolition of serfdom in 1861, the use of the Polish language noticeably increased in eastern Lithuania and western Belarus. Many Lithuanians, living further east, were unable to receive the Lithuanian printed books smuggled into Lithuania by knygnešiai during the time of the ban on printing books in the Latin alphabet, and they switched to Polish. Although this also used the Latin alphabet, it was much less affected by the ban, because Polish was still used by the politically important class of the nobility, and also used predominantly in the biggest towns of Lithuania, and supported by the church.

=== National Revival ===
The Lithuanian National Revival had begun to intensify by the end of the 19th century, and the number of Lithuanian speakers and people identifying themselves as ethnic Lithuanians started to increase; but at the same time many Polish speaking Lithuanians, especially former szlachta, cut themselves adrift from the Lithuanian nation. There were population losses due to several border changes, Soviet deportations, the Holocaust of the Lithuanian Jews, and German and Polish repatriations during and after World War II. After World War II, the ethnic Lithuanian population remained stable: 79.3% in 1959 to 83.5% in 2002. Lithuania's citizenship law and the Constitution meet international and OSCE standards, guaranteeing universal human and civil rights.

== Population ==
View source data.
View source data.

Population pyramid of Lithuania over time

View source data.
View source data.

=== Life expectancy at birth ===
Historical life expectancy

Based on 2023 data:

- total: 77.3 years
- male: 72.86 years
- female: 81.71 years

Lithuania has a large difference between the life expectancy of men and women, which is 9 years.

Period	Life expectancy in Years
1950–1955	60.83
1955–1960	▲66.88
1960–1965	▲69.88
1965–1970	▲71.28
1970–1975	▼71.19
1975–1980	▼70.67
1980–1985	▼70.53
1985–1990	▲71.57
1990–1995	▼69.73
1995–2000	▲70.25
2000–2005	▲71.62
2005–2010	▲71.86
2010–2015	▲73.99

== Vital statistics ==
Source: Statistical yearbooks of Lithuania

Notable events in Lithuanian demographics:

- 1915–1918 – World War I

	Average population (1996 onwards, at beginning of the year)	Live births	Deaths	Natural change	Crude birth rate (per 1000)	Crude death rate (per 1000)	Natural change (per 1000)	Crude migration change (per 1000)
1915	2,137,000	38,722	43,596	−4,874	18.1	20.4	−2.3	2.3
1916	2,141,000	35,565	31,512	4,053	16.6	14.7	1.9	−3.3
1917	2,134,000	32,266	43,047	−10,781	15.1	20.2	−5.1	−1.0
1918	2,121,000	33,176	47,522	−14,346	15.6	22.4	−6.8	0.7
1919	2,108,000	41,095	51,930	−10,835	19.5	24.6	−5.1	3.2
1920	2,104,000	47,642	44,487	3,155	22.6	21.1	1.5	4.2
1921	2,116,000	51,864	31,915	19,949	24.5	15.1	9.4	0.1
1922	2,136,000	58,064	37,598	20,466	27.2	17.6	9.6	2.1
1923	2,161,000	60,869	32,432	28,437	28.2	15.0	13.2	−0.2
1924	2,189,000	63,864	35,493	28,371	29.2	16.2	13.0	−0.2
1925	2,217,000	63,743	37,179	26,564	28.8	16.8	12.0	0.6
1926	2,245,000	63,655	34,380	29,275	28.4	15.3	13.0	−0.5
1927	2,273,000	66,114	38,897	27,217	29.1	17.1	12.0	0.3
1928	2,301,000	65,945	35,698	27,116	28.7	15.5	11.8	−0.1
1929	2,328,000	63,083	39,669	23,414	27.1	17.0	10.1	1.1
1930	2,354,000	64,164	37,151	27,013	27.3	15.8	11.5	−0.5
1931	2,380,000	63,419	37,478	25,941	26.6	15.7	10.9	0.4
1932	2,407,000	65,371	36,577	28,794	27.2	15.2	12.0	0.0
1933	2,436,000	62,145	32,749	29,396	25.5	13.4	12.1	−0.6
1934	2,464,000	60,770	35,789	24,981	24.7	14.5	10.1	−0.4
1935	2,488,000	57,970	34,595	23,375	23.3	13.9	9.4	0.6
1936	2,513,000	60,446	33,440	25,939	24.1	13.3	10.3	−0.4
1937	2,538,000	56,393	33,260	22,433	22.2	13.1	8.8	1.1
1938	2,563,000	57,951	32,256	24,562	22.6	12.6	9.6	−60.7
1939^{1}	2,432,000	54,184	32,983	21,201	22.3	13.6	8.7	

^{1} the figures of 1939 exclude the Klaipėda Region

Source: Official Statistics Portal

	Average population	Live births	Deaths	Natural change	Crude birth rate (per 1000)	Crude death rate (per 1000)	Natural change (per 1000)	Crude migration change (per 1000)	Total fertility rate	Life expectancy males	Life expectancy females	Life expectancy total
1945	2,520,000	60,392	35,201	25,191	24.0	14.0	10.0	−6.0				
1946	2,530,000	58,399	37,688	20,711	23.1	14.9	8.2	−4.2				
1947	2,540,000	59,680	39,716	19,964	23.5	15.6	7.9	−3.9				
1948	2,550,000	58,780	35,137	23,643	23.1	13.8	9.3	−5.4				
1949	2,560,000	63,034	32,049	30,985	24.6	12.5	12.1	−9.4				
1950	2,567,000	60,719	30,870	29,849	23.7	12.0	11.6	−10.8				
1951	2,569,000	58,504	29,693	28,811	22.8	11.6	11.2	−8.5				
1952	2,576,000	56,944	28,166	28,778	22.1	10.9	11.2	−5.7				
1953	2,590,000	52,610	27,118	25,492	20.3	10.5	9.8	−3.3				
1954	2,607,000	54,229	25,559	28,670	20.8	9.8	11.0	−2.6				
1955	2,629,000	55,525	24,138	31,387	21.1	9.2	11.9	−2.8				
1956	2,653,000	53,741	21,869	31,872	20.3	8.2	12.0	−1.5				
1957	2,681,000	56,223	23,361	32,862	21.0	8.7	12.3	−1.1				
1958	2,711,000	61,190	22,103	39,087	22.6	8.2	14.0	−2.2	2.63			
1959	2,744,000	62,240	24,688	37,553	22.7	9.0	14.0	0.2	2.63			
1960	2,782,000	62,485	21,611	40,874	22.5	7.8	14.7	1.8	2.59			
1961	2,828,000	62,775	23,365	39,410	22.2	8.3	13.9	−0.9	2.57			
1962	2,865,000	59,728	24,925	34,803	20.8	8.7	12.1	−2.4	2.64			
1963	2,893,000	57,024	23,112	33,912	19.7	8.0	11.7	0.4	2.45			
1964	2,928,000	55,856	21,830	34,026	19.1	7.5	11.6	1.7	2.31			
1965	2,967,000	53,818	23,467	30,351	18.1	7.9	10.2	2.9	2.21			
1966	3,006,000	54,275	23,799	30,476	18.1	7.9	10.1	2.9	2.34			
1967	3,045,000	53,806	24,571	29,235	17.7	8.1	9.6	2.9	2.27			
1968	3,083,000	54,258	25,725	28,533	17.6	8.3	9.3	1.1	2.25			
1969	3,115,000	54,263	27,156	27,107	17.4	8.7	8.7	0.6	2.29			
1970	3,144,000	55,519	28,048	27,471	17.7	8.9	8.7	2.4	2.40			
1971	3,179,000	56,044	26,972	29,072	17.6	8.5	9.1	1.9	2.41			
1972	3,214,000	54,616	29,252	25,364	17.0	9.1	7.9	1.4	2.35			
1973	3,244,000	51,944	29,160	22,784	16.0	9.0	7.0	2.2	2.22			
1974	3,274,000	51,941	29,612	22,329	15.9	9.0	6.8	1.7	2.21			
1975	3,302,000	51,766	31,265	20,501	15.7	9.5	6.2	2.0	2.18			
1976	3,329,000	52,296	31,972	20,324	15.7	9.6	6.1	1.7	2.18			
1977	3,355,000	52,166	32,932	19,234	15.5	9.8	5.7	1.4	2.14			
1978	3,379,000	51,821	34,008	17,813	15.3	10.1	5.3	0.4	2.09			
1979	3,398,000	51,937	34,897	17,040	15.3	10.3	5.0	−0.6	2.05			
1980	3,413,000	51,765	35,871	15,894	15.2	10.5	4.7	1.2	1.99			
1981	3,433,000	52,249	35,579	16,670	15.2	10.4	4.9	2.1	1.98			
1982	3,457,000	53,141	35,040	18,101	15.4	10.1	5.2	2.9	1.97			
1983	3,485,000	57,589	36,451	21,138	16.5	10.5	6.1	2.3	2.10			
1984	3,514,000	57,576	38,666	18,910	16.4	11.0	5.4	3.4	2.07			
1985	3,545,000	58,454	39,169	19,285	16.5	11.0	5.4	4.2	2.09			
1986	3,579,000	59,705	35,788	23,917	16.7	10.0	6.7	3.7	2.12			
1987	3,616,000	59,360	36,917	22,443	16.4	10.2	6.2	4.6	2.11			
1988	3,655,000	56,727	37,649	19,078	15.5	10.3	5.2	2.7	2.02			
1989	3,684,000	55,782	38,150	17,632	15.1	10.3	4.8	−1.0	1.98			
1990	3,698,000	56,868	39,760	17,108	15.3	10.7	4.6	−3.0	2.02	66.4	76.3	71.5
1991	3,704,000	56,219	41,013	15,206	15.2	11.1	4.1	−5.2	2.00			
1992	3,700,000	53,617	41,455	12,162	14.5	11.2	3.3	−7.9	1.94			
1993	3,683,000	47,464	46,107	1,357	12.9	12.5	0.4	−7.4	1.74			
1994	3,657,000	42,376	46,486	−4,110	11.6	12.7	−1.1	−6.5	1.57			
1995	3,629,000	41,195	45,306	−4,111	11.4	12.5	−1.1	−2.7	1.55	63.3	75.1	69.1
1996	3,615,212	39,066	42,896	−3,830	10.8	11.9	−1.1	−6.5	1.49	64.6	75.9	70.3
1997	3,588,013	37,812	41,143	−3,331	10.5	11.5	−0.9	−6.2	1.47	65.5	76.6	71.1
1998	3,562,261	37,019	40,757	−3,738	10.4	11.4	−1.0	−6.2	1.46	66.0	76.7	71.4
1999	3,536,401	36,415	40,003	−3,588	10.3	11.3	−1.0	−5.9	1.46	66.4	77.0	71.8
2000	3,512,074	34,149	38,919	−4,770	9.7	11.1	−1.4	−5.8	1.39	66.7	77.4	72.1
2001	3,486,998	31,185	40,399	−9,214	8.9	11.6	−2.6	−6.6	1.29	65.9	77.4	71.7
2002	3,454,637	29,541	41,072	−11,531	8.6	11.9	−3.3	−3.4	1.23	66.2	77.4	71.8
2003	3,431,497	29,977	40,990	−11,013	8.7	11.9	−3.2	−6.3	1.26	66.4	77.7	72.1
2004	3,398,929	29,769	41,340	−11,571	8.8	12.2	−3.4	−9.5	1.27	66.3	77.7	72.0
2005	3,355,220	29,510	43,799	−14,289	8.8	13.1	−4.3	−15.2	1.29	65.2	77.5	71.3
2006	3,289,835	29,606	44,813	−15,207	9.0	13.6	−4.6	−7.5	1.33	65.1	77.1	71.0
2007	3,249,983	30,020	45,624	−15,604	9.2	14.0	−4.8	−6.7	1.36	64.5	77.2	70.7
2008	3,212,605	31,536	43,832	−12,296	9.8	13.6	−3.8	−5.1	1.45	65.9	77.5	71.7
2009	3,183,856	32,165	42,032	−9,867	10.1	13.2	−3.1	−10.1	1.50	67.1	78.6	72.9
2010	3,141,976	30,676	42,120	−11,444	9.8	13.4	−3.6	−24.8	1.50	67.6	78.8	73.2
2011	3,052,588	30,268	41,037	−10,769	9.9	13.4	−3.5	−12.5	1.55	68.0	79.1	73.6
2012	3,003,641	30,459	40,938	−10,479	10.1	13.6	−3.5	−6.2	1.60	68.4	79.4	74.0
2013	2,974,637	29,885	41,511	−11,626	10.1	14.0	−3.9	−5.1	1.59	68.5	79.3	74.0
2014	2,947,862	30,369	40,252	−9,883	10.3	13.7	−3.4	−3.8	1.63	69.1	79.7	74.5
2015	2,926,644	31,475	41,776	−10,301	10.8	14.3	−3.5	−7.1	1.70	69.1	79.5	74.4
2016	2,895,573	30,623	41,106	−10,483	10.6	14.2	−3.6	−9.0	1.69	69.5	79.9	74.8
2017	2,859,007	28,696	40,142	−11,446	10.1	14.1	−4.0	−7.5	1.63	70.7	80.3	75.7
2018	2,826,200	28,149	39,574	−11,425	10.0	14.1	−4.1	−0.9	1.63	70.9	80.5	75.9
2019	2,812,200	27,393	38,281	−10,888	9.8	13.7	−3.9	3.1	1.43	71.4	80.9	76.3
2020	2,809,977	25,144	43,547	−18,403	9.0	15.6	−6.6	6.8	1.36	70.0	80.0	75.1
2021	2,810,761	23,330	47,746	−24,416	8.3	17.0	–8.7	7.0	1.34	69.6	78.9	74.3
2022	2,805,998	22,068	42,884	−20,816	7.8	15.1	–7.3	25.7	1.27	71.3	80.1	75.8
2023	2,857,279	20,623	37,005	−16,382	7.2	12.9	–5.7	15.7	1.18	72.9	81.7	77.4
2024	2,885,891	19,086	37,453	−18,394	6.6	13.0	−6.4	8.0	1.11	73.0	81.6	77.4
2025	2,890,664	17,642	37,491	–19,849	6.1	13.0	–6.9	5.6	1.04			
2026	2,887,592	16,750(e)							0.99 - 1.00 (e)			

=== Current vital statistics ===
By data of Statistics Lithuania

Period	Live births	Deaths	Natural increase
January—October 2025	14,939	31,175	−16,236
January—October 2026	14,172	31,083	−16,911
Difference	▼ –767 (–5.13%)	▼ –92 (–0.29%)	▼ –675

View source data.

=== Total fertility rates by counties ===
2025
Counties	TFR
Klaipėda county	1.11
Kaunas county	1.06
Šiauliai county	1.05
Marijampolė county	1.04
Lithuania	1.04
Tauragė county	1.03
Telšiai county	1.03
Vilnius county	1.02
Utena county	0.98
Panevėžys county	0.96
Alytus county	0.94

=== Structure of the population ===
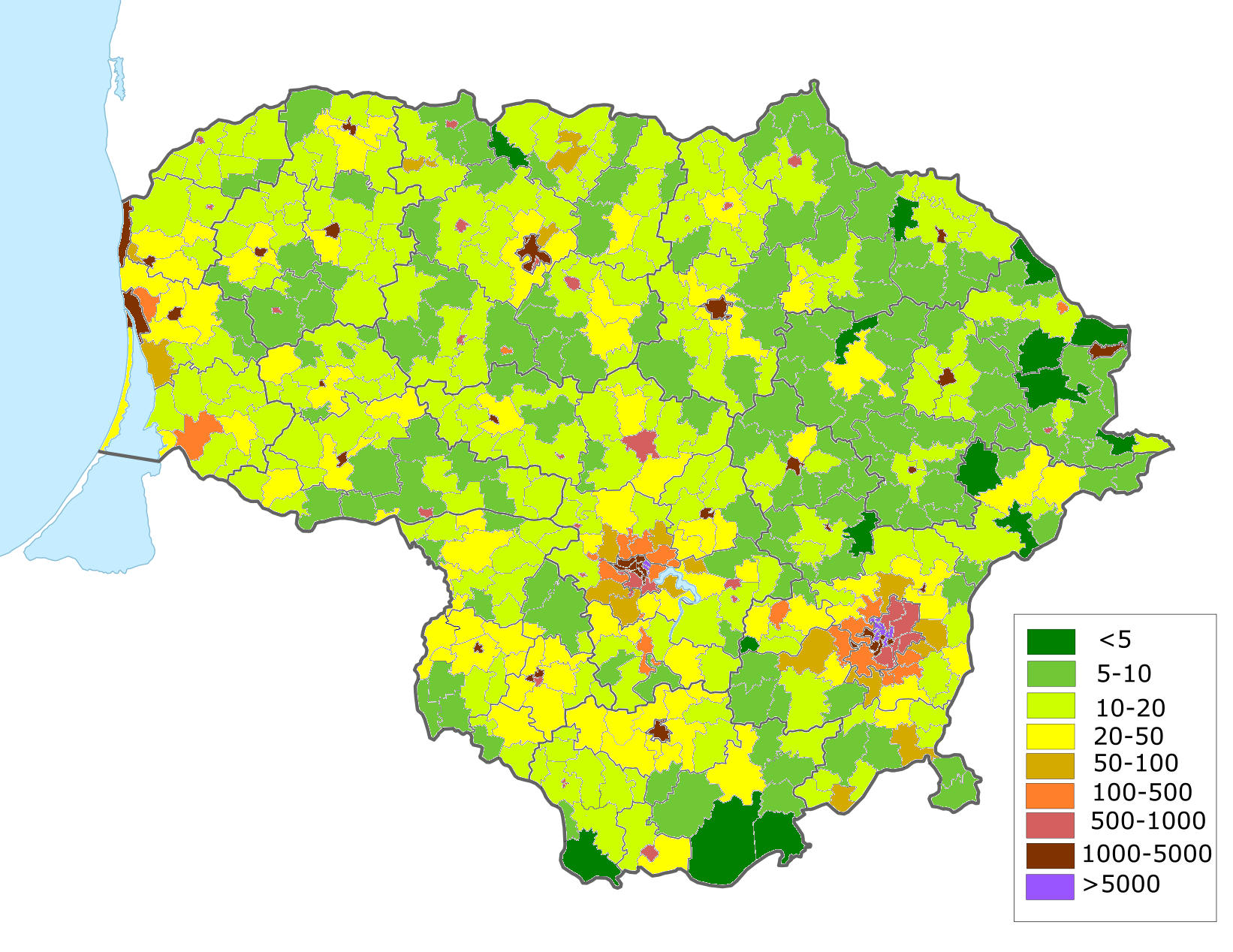
Population density in Lithuanian elderships (2021)

Population by Sex and Age Group (Census 01.I.2021):

Age group	Male	Female	Total	%
Total	1 304 965	1 505 796	2 810 761	100
0–4	68 362	64 287	132 649	4.72
5–9	73 251	69 389	142 640	5.07
10–14	72 399	69 383	141 782	5.04
15–19	66 376	63 291	129 667	4.61
20–24	73 506	69 556	143 062	5.09
25–29	86 449	82 753	169 202	6.02
30–34	99 253	95 926	195 179	6.94
35–39	94 857	92 583	187 440	6.67
40–44	89 807	90 697	180 504	6.42
45–49	93 631	100 431	194 062	6.90
50–54	97 747	108 319	206 066	7.33
55–59	101 687	116 887	218 574	7.78
60–64	92 818	117 176	209 994	7.47
65–69	65 526	93 500	159 026	5.66
70–74	49 426	82 581	132 007	4.70
75–79	36 574	73 494	110 068	3.92
80–84	25 387	60 804	86 191	3.07
85–89	12 874	37 019	49 893	1.78
90–94	4 373	14 613	18 986	0.68
95–99	630	2 873	3 503	0.12
100+	32	234	266	0.01
Age group	Male	Female	Total	Percent
0–14	214 012	203 059	417 071	14.84
15–64	896 131	937 619	1 833 750	65.24
65+	194 822	365 118	559 940	19.92

== Ethnic composition ==
Lithuanians are a Baltic ethnic group (i.e. Balts), closely related to neighbouring Latvians, who speak Lithuanian, a Baltic language of the Indo-European language family. The group is distinct from neighbouring Slavic and Germanic peoples, although the historical union with Poland in the Polish–Lithuanian Commonwealth, as well German and Russian colonization and settlement left cultural and religious influences.

=== Before World War II ===
Population of Lithuania according to ethnic group 1923/1925 ^{1}
Ethnic group	Census of Lithuania in 1923		Census of the Klaipėda Region in 1925	
Ethnic group	Number	%	Number	%
Lithuanians	1,701,863	83.9	37,626	26.6
Memellanders			34,337	24.2
Jews	153,743	7.6	578	0.4
Germans	29,231	1.4	59,337	41.9
Poles	65,599	3.2	29	0.0
Russians	50,460	2.5	267	0.2
Latvians	14,883	0.7	47	0.0
Belarusians	4,421	0.2	–	–
Tatars	973	0.0		
Romani	284	0.0		
Karaites	141	0.0		
Estonians	46	0.0		
Ukrainians	43	0.0		
Others	7,284	0.2	9,424	6.7
Total	2,028,971		141,645	

^{1} Source: . The Klaipėda Region was annexed from Germany in 1923, but was not included in the 1923 census. A separate census in the Klaipėda region was held in 1925.

=== After World War II ===
Among the Baltic states, Lithuania has the most homogeneous population. According to the census conducted in 2021, 84.6% of the population identified themselves as Lithuanians, 6.5% as Poles, 5.0% as Russians, 1.0% as Belarusians, and 2.3% as members of other ethnic groups.

Population of Lithuania according to ethnic group 1959–2021
Ethnic group	census 1959^{1}		census 1970^{2}		census 1979^{3}		census 1989^{4}		census 2001^{5}		census 2011^{6}		census 2021^{7}	
Ethnic group	Number	%	Number	%	Number	%	Number	%	Number	%	Number	%	Number	%
Lithuanians	2,150,767	79.3	2,506,751	80.1	2,712,233	80.0	2,924,251	79.6	2,907,293	83.4	2,561,314	84.2	2,378,118	84.61
Poles	230,107	8.5	240,203	7.7	247,022	7.3	257,994	7.0	234,989	6.7	200,317	6.6	183,421	6.53
Russians	231,014	8.5	267,989	8.6	303,493	8.9	344,455	9.4	219,789	6.3	176,913	5.8	141,122	5.02
Belarusians	30,256	1.1	45,412	1.5	57,584	1.7	63,169	1.7	42,866	1.2	36,227	1.2	28,183	1.00
Ukrainians	17,692	0.7	25,099	0.8	31,982	0.9	44,789	1.2	22,488	0.6	16,423	0.5	14,168	0.50
Jews	24,667	0.9	23,538	0.8	14,691	0.4	12,390	0.3	4,007	0.1	3,050	0.1	2,256	0.08
Romani	1,238	0.1	1,880	0.1	2,306	0.1	2,718	0.1	2,571	0.1	2,115	0.1	2,251	0.08
Tatars	3,020	0.1	3,454	0.1	3,984	0.1	5,135	0.1	3,235	0.1	2,793	0.1	2,142	0.08
Germans	11,166	0.4	1,904	0.1	2,616	0.1	2,058	0.1	3,243	0.1	2,418	0.1	1,977	0.07
Latvians	6,318	0.2	5,063	0.2	4,354	0.1	4,229	0.1	2,955	0.1	2,025	0.1	1,572	0.06
Armenians	471	0.01	508	0.01	955	0.02	1655	0.04	1477	0.04	1233	0.04	1125	0.04
Azerbaijanis	500	0.01	711	0.02	1078	0.03	1314	0.03	788	0.02	648	0.02	575	0.02
Moldovans	164	0,00	764	0.02	724	0.02	1450	0.03	704	0.02	540	0.01	451	0.02
Georgians	326	0.01	472	0.01	623	0.01	658	0.01	437	0.01	372	0.01	333	0.01
Estonians	352	0.0	551	0.0	546	0.0	598	0.0	400	0.0	314	0.0	233	0.01
Kazakhs	112	0.00	200	0.00	567	0.01	663	0.01	145	0.00	144	0.00	214	0.01
Karaites	423	0.0	388	0.0	352	0.0	289	0.0	273	0.0	241	0.0	192	0.01
Chuvashs	254	0.00	336	0.01	468	0.01	681	0.01	264	0.00	164	0.00	177	0.01
Greeks	60	0.00	411	0.01	168	0.00	174	0.00	176	0.00	159	0.00	134	0.01
Lezgins	35	0.00	32	0.00	49	0.00	112	0.00	82	0.00	59	0.00	131	0.01
Uzbeks	548	0.02	252	0.00	2011	0.05	1455	0.03	159	0.00	157	0.00	126	0.01
Mordvins	244	0.00	258	0.00	366	0.01	491	0.01	112	0.00	94	0.00	121	0.01
Ossetians	135	0.00	159	0.00	277	0.00	273	0.00	173	0.00	119	0.00	118	0.01
Bulgarians	29	0.00	113	0.00	150	0.00	237	0.00	171	0.00	170	0.00	110	0.01
Chinese	9	0.00	7	0.00	8	0.00	11	0.00	57	0.00	112	0.00	97	0.01
Chechens	6	0.00	11	0.00	74	0.00	72	0.00	54	0.00	76	0.00	85	0.01
Bashkirs	101	0.00	171	0.00	293	0.00	420	0.01	136	0.00	84	0.00	81	0.01
Turks	5	0.00	5	0.00	30	0.00	8	0.00					78	0.01
Hungarians	29	0.00	68	0.00	59	0.00	107	0.00	116	0.00	72	0.00	76	0.01
Vietnamese	0	0.00	26	0.00	2	0.00	0	0.00	79	0.00	61	0.00	75	0.01
French	22	0.00	23	0.00	19	0.00	26	0.00	77	0.00	104	0.00	71	0.01
Romanians	15	0.00	27	0.00	28	0.00	173	0.00	100	0.00	77	0.00	68	0.01
Finns	109	0.00	98	0.00	121	0.00	162	0.00	160	0.00	109	0.00	68	0.01
Udmurts	50	0.00	75	0.00	137	0.00	224	0.00	99	0.00	71	0.00	67	0.01
Koreans	29	0.00	75	0.00	140	0.00	119	0.00	101	0.00	67	0.00	62	0.01
Maris	58	0.00	85	0.00	142	0.00	241	0.00	81	0.00	60	0.00	60	0.01
Komis	73	0.00	80	0.00	134	0.00	167	0.00	145	0.00	53	0.00	54	0.01
Italians	3	0.00	7	0.00	6	0.00	10	0.00					52	0.01
Britons	2	0.00	6	0.00	5	0.00	7	0.00					48	0.01
Arabs	3	0.00	0	0.00	5	0.00	7	0.00					48	0.01
Karelians	97	0.00	100	0.00	138	0.00	159	0.00	84	0.00	39	0.00	47	0.01
Danes									66	0.00	94	0.00	44	0.01
Tajiks	75	0.00	31	0.00	207	0.00	522	0.01	65	0.00	43	0.00	42	0.01
Czechs	53	0.00	73	0.00	60	0.00	67	0.00	56	0.00	31	0.00	27	0.01
Dutch			0	0.00	0	0.00	0	0.00					25	0.01
Turkmens	52	0.00	28	0.00	143	0.00	193	0.00					25	0.01
Spanish	11	0.00	22	0.00	11	0.00	15	0.00					24	0.01
Egyptians													23	0.01
Swedes													21	0.01
Serbs			17	0.00	6	0.00							19	0.01
Gagauzes	3	0.00	38	0.00	8	0.00	53	0.00					18	0.01
Afghans			0	0.00	1	0.00	0	0.00					16	0.01
Abazins	0	0.00	5	0.00	5	0.00	6	0.00					14	0.01
Mexicans													14	0.01
Norwegians													14	0.01
Punjabis													14	0.01
Albanians	0	0.00	16	0.00	2	0.00	2	0.00					13	0.01
Kyrgyz	18	0.00	15	0.00	223	0.00	118	0.00					13	0.01
Brazilians													13	0.01
Japanese	0	0.00	0	0.00	1	0.00	1	0.00					12	0.01
Abkhazians	7	0.00	7	0.00	23	0.00	25	0.00					11	0.01
Kalmyks	7	0.00	26	0.00	51	0.00	46	0.00					10	0.01
Other	150	0.00	139	0.00	9	0.00	29	0.00					330	0.01
Not indicated	74	0.00	0	0.00	2	0.00	1	0.00					49,633	1.77
Total	2,711,445		3,128,236		3,391,490		3,674,802		3,483,972		3,043,429		2,810,761	
^{1} Source:. ^{2} Source:. ^{3} Source:. ^{4} Source:. ^{5} Source: . ^{6} Source:.

Poles are concentrated in the Vilnius Region, the area controlled by Poland in the interwar period. There are especially large Polish communities in Vilnius district municipality (47% of the population) and Šalčininkai district municipality (76%). The Electoral Action of Poles in Lithuania, an ethnic minority political party, has strong influence in these areas and has representation in the Seimas. The party is most active in local politics and controls several municipal councils.

Russians, even though they are almost as numerous as Poles, are much more evenly scattered and lack strong political cohesion. The most prominent community lives in Visaginas (47%). Most of them are engineers who moved with their families from the Russian SFSR to work at the Ignalina Nuclear Power Plant. A number of ethnic Russians (mostly military) left Lithuania after the declaration of independence in 1990.

Another major change in the ethnic composition of Lithuania was the extermination of the Jewish population during the Holocaust. Before World War II about 7.5% of the population was Jewish; they were concentrated in cities and towns and had a significant influence on crafts and business. They were called Litvaks and had a strong culture. The population of Vilnius, sometimes nicknamed Northern Jerusalem, was about 30% Jewish. Almost all of these Jews were killed during the Nazi German occupation, or later emigrated to the United States and Israel. Now there are only about 4,000 Jews living in Lithuania.

=== Proportion of the population by ethnicity ===
Proportion of the population by ethnicity, compared to the total resident population (%)
Ethnic group	2011	2021	2026
Lithuanians	84.1	84.6	82.1
Poles	6.6	6.5	6.2
Russians	5.8	5.0	4.9
Ukrainians	0.5	0.5	2.3
Belarusians	1.2	1	2.0
Jews	0.1	0.1	0.1
Romani	0.1	0.1	0.1
Tatars	0.1	0.1	0.1
Germans	0.1	0.1	0.1
Latvians	0.1	0.1	0.1
Other Ethnicities	0.2	0.2	2.1
Not Stated	1.1	1.7	0.0

== Nationality and immigration ==
Lithuania's membership of the European Union has made Lithuanian citizenship all the more appealing. Lithuanian citizenship is theoretically easier (see court ruling notes below) to obtain than that of many other European countries—only one great-grandparent is necessary to become a Lithuanian citizen. Persons who held citizenship in the Republic of Lithuania prior to June 15, 1940, and their children, grandchildren, and great-grandchildren (provided that these persons did not repatriate) are eligible for Lithuanian citizenship .

Lithuanian citizens are allowed to travel and work throughout the European Union without a visa or other restrictions.

The Lithuanian Constitutional Court ruled in November 2006 that a number of provisions of the Law of the Republic of Lithuania on citizenship are in conflict with the Lithuanian Constitution. In particular, the court ruled that a number of current provisions of the Citizenship Law implicitly or explicitly allowing dual citizenship are in conflict with the Constitution; such provisions amounted to the unconstitutional practice of making dual citizenship a common phenomenon rather than a rare exception. The provisions of the Citizenship Law announced to be unconstitutional are no longer valid and applicable to the extent stated by the Constitutional Court.

The Lithuanian Parliament amended the Citizenship Law substantially as a result of this court ruling, allowing dual citizenship for children of at least one Lithuanian parent who are born abroad, but preventing Lithuanians from retaining their Lithuanian citizenship after obtaining the citizenship of another country.

There are some special cases still permitting dual citizenship. See Lithuanian nationality law.

Largest groups of foreign residents
Rank	Nationality	Population (1 January 2024)	Population (1 January 2025)	Population (1 January 2026)	Population (1 July 2026)	Population (1 August 2026)	Population (1 September 2026)
1	Ukraine	86,353	77,080	79,868	78,802	79,469	80,312
2	Belarus	62,167	57,511	50,286	48,613	48,283	47,872
3	Russia	15,888	14,978	13,723	13,365	13,323	13,272
4	Uzbekistan	8,253	9,052	10,545	11,875	12,208	12,617
5	India	4,669	7,207	7,908	8,952	9,150	9,441
6	Tajikistan	5,702	6,678	6,611	7,258	7,361	7,473
7	Philippines	487	774	2,734	4,941	5,317	5,612
8	Kyrgyzstan	6,206	5,324	4,499	4,594	4,684	4,711
9	Azerbaijan	3,833	4,713	4,352	4,491	4,514	4,543
10	Kazakhstan	3,116	3,277	3,233	3,701	3,765	3,837
11	Pakistan	926	2,165	2,999	3,163	3,148	3,412
12	Turkey	1,915	2,369	2,278	2,463	2,508	2,692
13	Stateless	2,283	2,934	2,143	2,096	2,080	2,085
14	Georgia	2,019	1,816	1,611	1,812	1,801	1,842
15	(European Union) Latvia	1,259	1,545	1,695	1,759	1,779	1,794
16	Bangladesh	379	1,032	1,581	1,674	1,658	1,722
17	Zimbabwe	41	404	544	1,249	1,370	1,442
18	Moldova	1,361	1,299	1,146	1,212	1,217	1,206
19	(European Union) Germany	902	1,037	1,141	1,184	1,190	1,193
20	Morocco	213	557	945	965	940	1,110
21	(European Union) Poland	794	909	969	1,009	1,013	1,016
22	Nigeria	641	765	860	911	917	998
23	United Kingdom	818	925	966	973	979	985
24	United States	792	865	908	918	925	928
25	Israel	730	833	853	876	875	873
26	(European Union) Italy	612	753	806	841	845	853
27	(European Union) Romania	465	588	660	687	690	692
28	Cameroon	322	415	560	606	601	660
29	(European Union) France	486	568	595	608	590	576
30	Brazil	147	152	191	349	393	476
31	(European Union) Spain	378	434	469	494	489	471
32	Armenia	459	475	438	434	432	443
33	South Africa	41	60	171	320	380	440
34	Vietnam	249	424	317	400	420	436
35	China	417	472	438	424	418	420
36	Egypt	327	384	404	415	406	413
37	Sri Lanka	346	425	382	384	382	400
38	(European Union) Sweden	349	399	415	449	451	398
39	Syria	364	376	379	381	380	381
40	Nepal	234	217	240	317	333	374
41	Iran	321	357	371	368	361	364
42	Afghanistan	342	346	329	329	331	339
43	Algeria	81	186	273	304	298	310
44	(European Union) Bulgaria	203	248	256	272	274	274
45	(European Union) Netherlands	209	255	261	267	267	270
46	(European Union) Estonia	176	218	249	261	260	260
47	Ghana	121	191	218	232	231	239
48	(European Union) Portugal	176	231	235	240	244	239
49	Lebanon	206	231	217	206	202	200
	Others	3,070	3,534	3,795	3,981	4,040	4,083
Total		221,848	217,988	217,067	222,425	224,192	226,999

=== Lithuania migration data, 1990–present ===
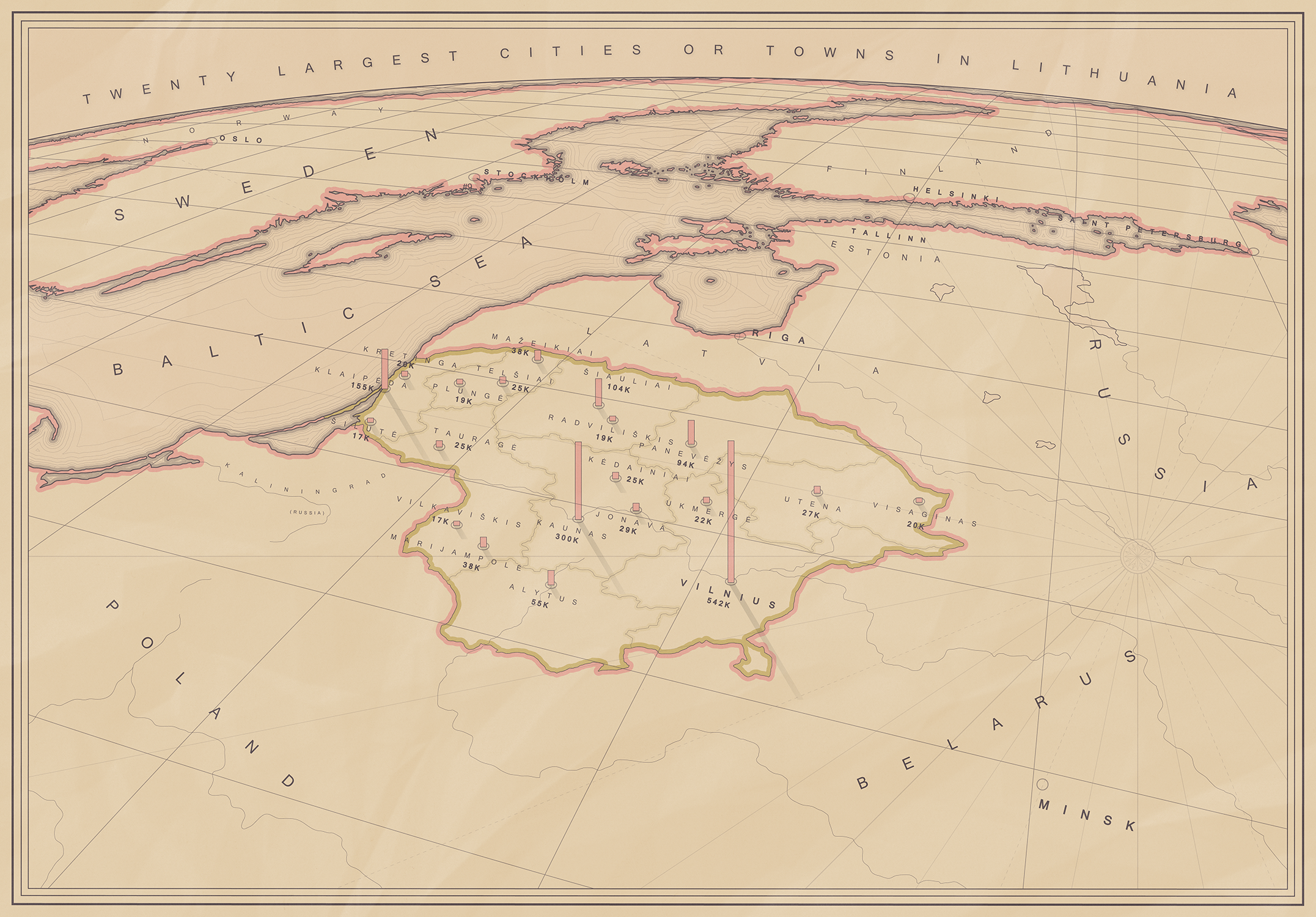
Most populous cities in Lithuania in 2016

Year	Immigrants	Emigrants	Net Migration
1990	14,744	23,592	−8,848
1991	11,828	22,503	−10,675
1992	6,640	31,972	−25,322
1993	2,850	26,840	−23,990
1994	1,664	25,859	−24,195
1995	2,020	25,688	−23,668
1996	3,025	26,394	−23,369
1997	2,536	24,957	−22,421
1998	2,706	24,828	−22,122
1999	2,679	23,418	−20,739
2000	1,510	21,816	−20,306
2001	4,694	27,841	−23,147
2002	5,110	16,719	−11,609
2003	4,728	26,283	−21,555
2004	5,553	37,691	−32,138
2005	6,789	57,885	−51,096
2006	7,745	32,390	−24,645
2007	8,609	30,383	−21,774
2008	9,297	25,750	−16,453
2009	6,487	38,500	−32,013
2010	5,213	83,157	−77,944
2011	15,685	53,863	−38,178
2012	28,797	46,807	−18,010
2013	30,924	45,049	−14,125
2014	33,544	43,874	−10,330
2015	31,085	50,445	−19,360
2016	31,395	56,299	−24,904
2017	33,305	53,951	−20,646
2018	37,420	38,638	−1,218
2019	46,526	35,441	11,085
2020	46,020	25,245	20,775
2021	44,858	25,205	19,653
2022	87,367	15,270	72,097
2023	66,682	21,688	44,994
2024	51,845	28,705	23,140
2025	44,705*	28,540*	16,165*

== Languages ==
Native languages in Lithuania, 2021 census.
Lithuanian	85.33%
Russian	6.79%
Polish	5.12%
Belarusian	0.24%
Ukrainian	0.17%
Other	0.61%
Two languages	1.75%

Knowledge of foreign languages in Lithuania, 2022 census.
Russian	68.2%
English	55.6%
German	10.5%
Polish	9.4%
French	2.6%

The Lithuanian language is the country's sole official language countrywide. It is the first language of over 85% of population and is also spoken by 295,244 out of 432,643 non-Lithuanians. Ethnic minorities, such as the Polish population that mostly speaks Polish; Russians, Belarusians, Ukrainians who immigrated after World War II and converse in Russian, generally use their associated languages as their main language.

Nearly every citizen of Lithuania is considered to be at least bilingual, with the older generations being able to speak Russian as a second language, as the Soviet era had imposed the official use of Russian, while the independence generations usually speak English as their second language. According to the census of 2021, 31% of the population can speak English, 67.4% – Russian. The average Lithuanian knows 2.7 languages with a substantial portion of the total population (37%) speaking at least two foreign languages.

Approximately 14,800 pupils started their 2012 school year in schools where the curriculum is conducted in Russian (down from 76,000 in 1991), and about 12,300 enrolled in Polish schools (compared to 11,400 in 1991 and 21,700 in 2001). There are also schools in the Belarusian language, as well as in English, German, and French.

There are perhaps 50 speakers of Karaim, a Turkic language spoken by Karaite Jews, in Lithuania.

Lithuanian Sign Language and Russian Sign Language are used by the deaf community.

Baltic Romani is spoken by the Lithuanian Roma (Gypsy) minority.

== Religion ==
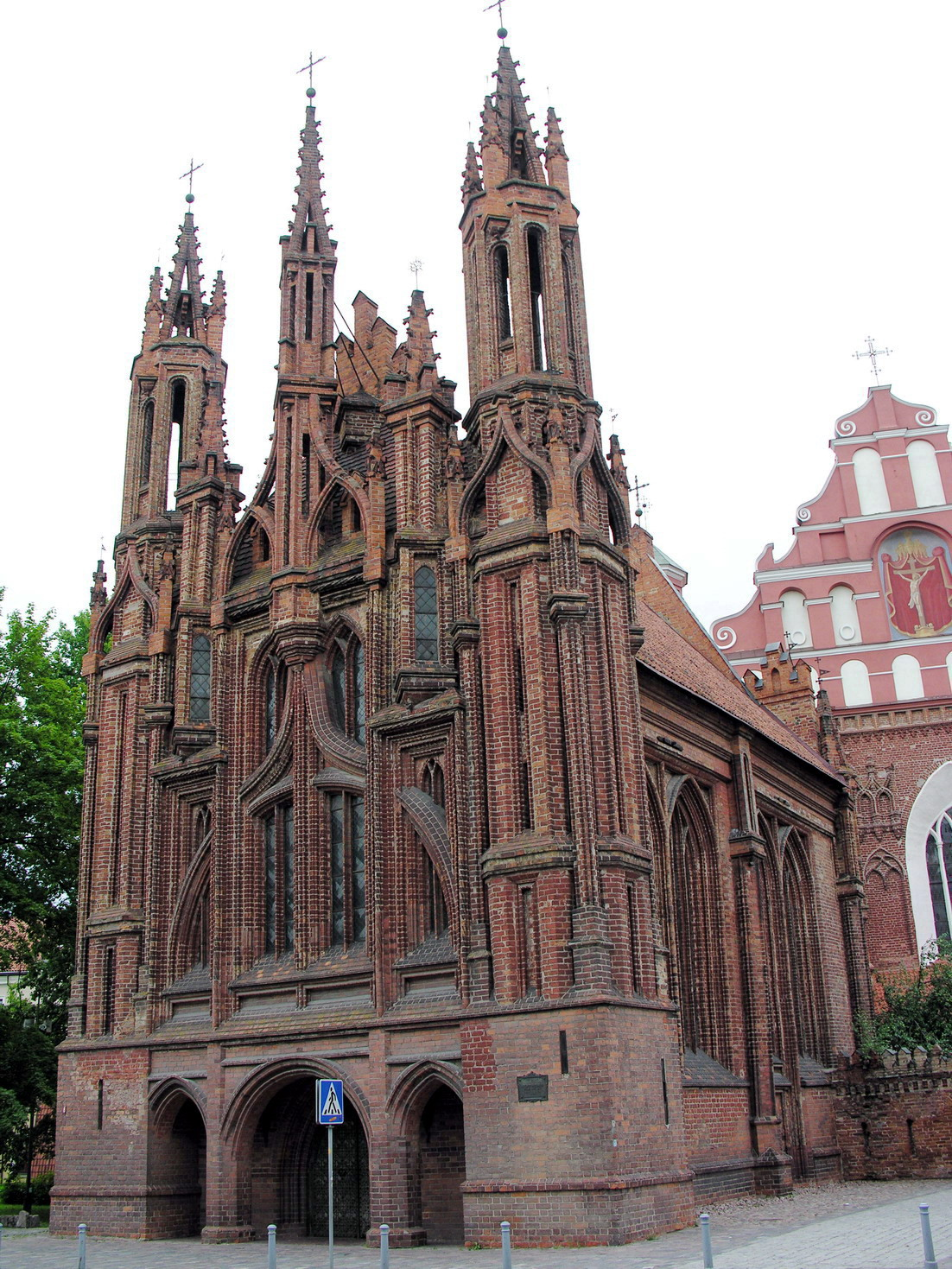
St. Anne's Church, Vilnius

As per the 2011 census, 77.2% of Lithuanians identified themselves as Roman Catholic. The Church has been the majority denomination since the Christianisation of Lithuania at the end of the 14th century. Some priests actively led the resistance against the Communist regime (symbolised by the Hill of Crosses).

In the first half of the 20th century, the Lutheran Protestant church had around 200,000 members, 9% of the total population, mostly Protestant Lithuanians from the former Memel Territory and Germans, but it has declined since 1945. Small Protestant communities are dispersed throughout the northern and western parts of the country. Believers and clergy suffered greatly during the Soviet occupation, with many killed, tortured or deported to Siberia. Various Protestant churches have established missions in Lithuania since 1990. 4.1% are Orthodox, 0.8% are Old Believers (both mainly among the Russian minority), 0.8% are Protestant and 6.1% have no religion.

Lithuania was historically home to a significant Jewish community and was an important center of Jewish scholarship and culture from the 18th century, until the community, numbering about 160,000 before World War II, was almost entirely annihilated during the Holocaust. By 2011, around 3000 people in Lithuania identified themselves as Jews, while around 1200 identified with Judaic religious community.

According to the 2005 Eurobarometer Poll, 12% said that "they do not believe there is any sort of spirit, god, or life force", 36% answered that "they believe there is some sort of spirit or life force" and 49% of Lithuanian citizens responded that "they believe there is a God".

== Education ==
According to the 2011 census, only around 0.2% of the Lithuanian population aged 10 and over were illiterate, the majority of them in rural areas. The proportion is similar for males and females.

The general education system in Lithuania consists of primary, basic, secondary and tertiary education. Primary, basic and secondary (or high school) education is free of charge to all residents and is compulsory for pupils under 16 years of age. Pre-primary education is also available free of charge to 5- and 6-year-old children but is not compulsory. Pre-primary schooling is attended by about 90% of pre-school age children in Lithuania. Primary, basic and secondary education in Lithuania is available to some ethnic minorities in their native languages, including Polish, Russian and Belarusian.

Primary schooling (Lithuanian: pradinis ugdymas) is available to children who have reached age 7 (or younger, should the parents so desire) and lasts four years. Primary school students are not assessed through a grade system, instead using oral or written feedback. Students begin studying their first foreign language in their second year of primary school. Data from the 2011 census showed that 99.1% of the population aged 20 and older have attained at least primary education, while around 27,000 pupils started the first grade in 2012.

Basic education (Lithuanian: pagrindinis ugdymas) covers grades 5 to 10. It is provided by basic, secondary, youth, vocational schools and gymnasiums. After completing the 10th grade, the students must take the basic education achievement test in the Lithuanian language, mathematics, and an elective basic education achievement test in their mother tongue (Belarusian, Polish, Russian or German). In 2011, 90.9% of the population of Lithuania aged 20 or older had attained the basic level of education.

Secondary education (Lithuanian: vidurinis ugdymas) in Lithuania is optional and available to students who have attained basic education. It covers two years (11th–12th grades in secondary schools and 3rd–4th grades in gymnasiums). At this level, students have the opportunity to adapt their study plans (subjects and study level) to their individual preferences. Secondary education is completed upon passing national matura examinations. These consist of as many as six separate examinations of which two (Lithuanian Language and Literature and one elective subject) are required to attain the diploma. As of 2011, 78.2% of the population of Lithuania aged 20 or older had attained the secondary level of education, including secondary education provided by vocational schools.

More than 60% of the graduates from secondary school every year choose to continue education at colleges and universities of the Lithuanian higher education system. As of 2013, there were 23 universities (including academies and business schools recognized as such) and 24 colleges operating in Lithuania. Vilnius University, founded in 1579, is the oldest and largest university in Lithuania. More than 48,000 students enrolled in all higher education programmes in Lithuania in 2011, including level I (professional bachelor and bachelor), level II (masters) and level III (doctorate) studies. Higher education in Lithuania is partly state-funded, with free-of-charge access to higher education constitutionally guaranteed to students deemed "good". There are also scholarships available to the best students.

== See also ==
- Lithuania
- Constitution of Lithuania
- Lithuanians in Brazil
- Ethnic history of the Vilnius region
- Russians in Lithuania
- Ukrainians in Lithuania
- Aging of Europe
