= Marrok =

Marrok may refer to:

- Sir Marrok, one of the lesser-known Knights of the Round Table
- The main villain of the 14th century poem Sir Tryamour
- A touring member of the Austrian band Harakiri for the Sky
- A Thoroughbred horse, winner of the 1999 Wellington Guineas
- The Marrok, leader of the North American werewolves in the Mercy Thompson novels by Patricia Briggs
