= The Boke of Cokery =

Cookery book

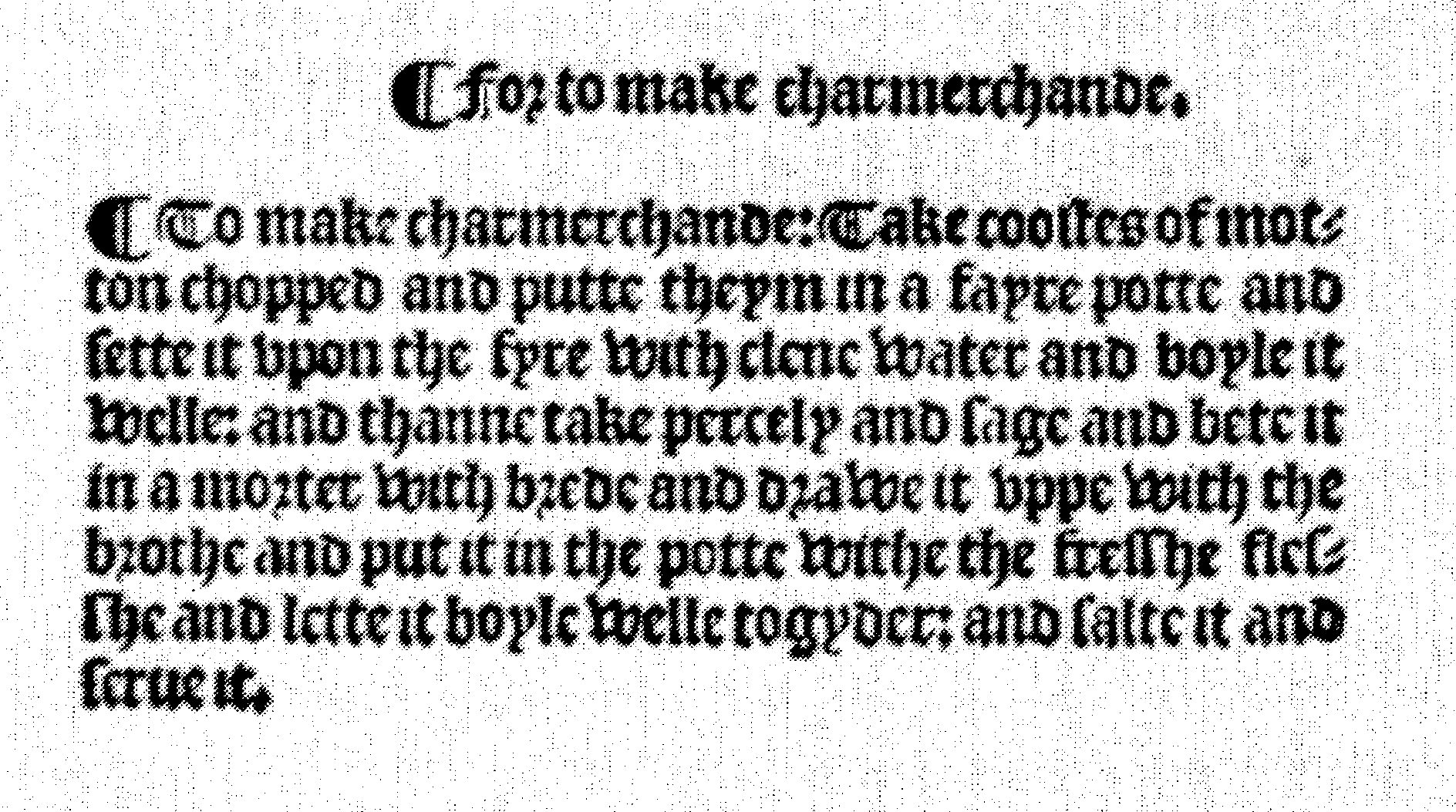
Charmerchand, a mutton stew. (Note: "To make charmerchande: Take coastes (ribs) of motton chopped and putte theym in a fayre potte and sette it upon the fyre with clene water and boyle it welle: and thanne take percely (parsley) and sage and bete it in a morter with brede and drawe it uppe with the brothe and put it in the potte withe the fresshe flesshe and lette it boyle welle togyder: and salte it and serue it.")

This Is the Boke of Cokery, or The Boke of Cokery, is believed to be the first cookery book printed in English. The name of the author is unknown. It was printed and published by Richard Pynson in 1500. The book remained in print for many years in the 16th century, but was superseded and forgotten by the 18th. The only known surviving copy of the book is in the possession of the Marquess of Bath at Longleat House, Wiltshire.

== Background ==
At the beginning of the 16th century, cookery books were not a novelty in England. The British Library has a manuscript, A Boke of Kokery, dating from about 1440, which draws heavily on earlier published work. The latter, dating from about 1430, consists of a "Kalendare de Potages dyvers" (a list of dishes), a "kalendare de Leche Metys" (a guide to sliced meats); and "Dyverse bake metis" (various baked meats). Like all manuscripts, such books were expensive and rare. It was not until printed versions became available that books had a wider circulation. William Caxton introduced printing to England in 1476, but the eighty or so titles that he printed did not include one on cookery; that innovation fell to Richard Pynson, nine years after Caxton's death.

This Is the Boke of Cokery was "emprynted without temple barre by Rycharde Pynson in the yere of our lorde MD". It has 124 (unnumbered) pages. The opening sentence sets out the purpose of the work:

Here beginneth a noble boke of festes royalle and Cokery a boke for a pryncis housholde or any other estates; and the makynge therof as ye shall fynde more playnly within this boke.

== Contents ==
The historian Stephen Mennell describes the book as "essentially medieval in character", focusing on the banqueting at aristocratic residences. It was not until later in the 16th century that cookery books began to give everyday recipes for use in ordinary households. The book gives details of numerous historical royal feasts, drawing on an early manuscript of recipes now at Holkham Hall, Norfolk. An example is "The feste of kynge Harry the Fourth to the Henawdes [men of Hainaut] and Frenchemen when they had justed [jousted] in smythefelde", which comprised three courses of exotic game and meats, including "Creme of Almondes; larks, stewed potage; venyson, partryche rost; quayle, egryt; rabettes, plovers, pomerynges; and a leache of brauwne wyth batters".

Jusselle Syngle, a beef broth. (Note: "To make Jusselle syngle: take fresshe brothe of flesshe and sette it on the fyre in a potte: do therto sage leves broken in two or in thre peces and percely (parsley) and colour thy brothe & than take egges and grated brede & medle theym togyder: and whan the potte boyleth put the comande to the brothe & salte it and styre it tyll it cruddes (forms a curd) and whan it cruddeth gadir it togyder with a scomer (shallow ladle) and alaye it with a lytell ale and salte it and serue it.")

Also in the book are details of the "feste of my lord chaunceler archibysshop of York at his stallacyon in Yorke the yere of our Lorde MCCCCLXV." Sixty-two cooks were employed in preparing the feast. The big birds were served with their plumage, the peacock with its tail spread. Among the drinks was "ipocrasse," a spiced wine:

To a quart of red wine, add an ounce of cinnamon and half an ounce of ginger; a quarter of an ounce of grains of paradise and long pepper, and half a pound of sugar. Bruise all this, not too small, and strain the wine through a cloth bag.

Among the recipes in the book are many for dishes that subsequently fell out of use, such as "Comyne" (a dish of almond milk spiced with cumin and thickened with eggs), "Jusselle" (a meat broth with ale), "Buknade" (a dish of veal and eggs) and "Charmerchande" (a mutton stew with sage and parsley, thickened with breadcrumbs).

== Later history ==
The book is noted by Andrew Maunsell in his 1595 Catalogue of English Printed Bookes as being in circulation in the 1530s under the title of A noble boke of festes royall and of Cookerie for Princes housholde. It appears to have had the market to itself for many years; Pynson's rival Wynkyn de Worde brought out The Boke of Kervynge (carving) in 1508, which overlaps to the extent of describing princely and lordly banqueting, but focuses on the serving rather than the cooking of such feasts. It was not until the 1540s that a recognisable successor was published – A Proper Newe Booke of Cokerye (1545). Pynson's book was evidently largely forgotten by the 18th century, when Samuel Pegge printed a survey of early English cookery books in the introduction to his edition of The Forme of Cury in 1780. In 1810, in Typographical Antiquities, Thomas Dibdin recorded that it was not known if anyone still possessed a copy.

In 1954 the copy of the book in the Longleat library – the only known surviving copy – was lent for an exhibition of cookery books going back over 450 years in London, celebrating the end of wartime and post-war food rationing.

== Notes, references and sources ==
=== Sources ===
- Ames, Joseph; William Herbert (1810). Typographical Antiquities. London: W. Miller. OCLC 1045368673.
- Mennell, Stephen (1996). All Manners of Food: Eating and Taste in England and France from the Middle Ages to the Present. Chicago: University of Illinois Press. ISBN 978-0-252-06490-6.
- Oxford, A. W. (1913). English Cookery Books to the Year 1850. London and New York: H. Frowde, Oxford University Press. OCLC 252887531.
- Pegge, Samuel (1780). The Forme of Cury. London: J. Nichols. OCLC 1045217682.
- Quayle, Eric (1978). Old Cook Books: An Illustrated History. London: Studio Vista. ISBN 978-0-289-70707-4.
