= Leičiai =

Social group in the Grand Duchy of Lithuania

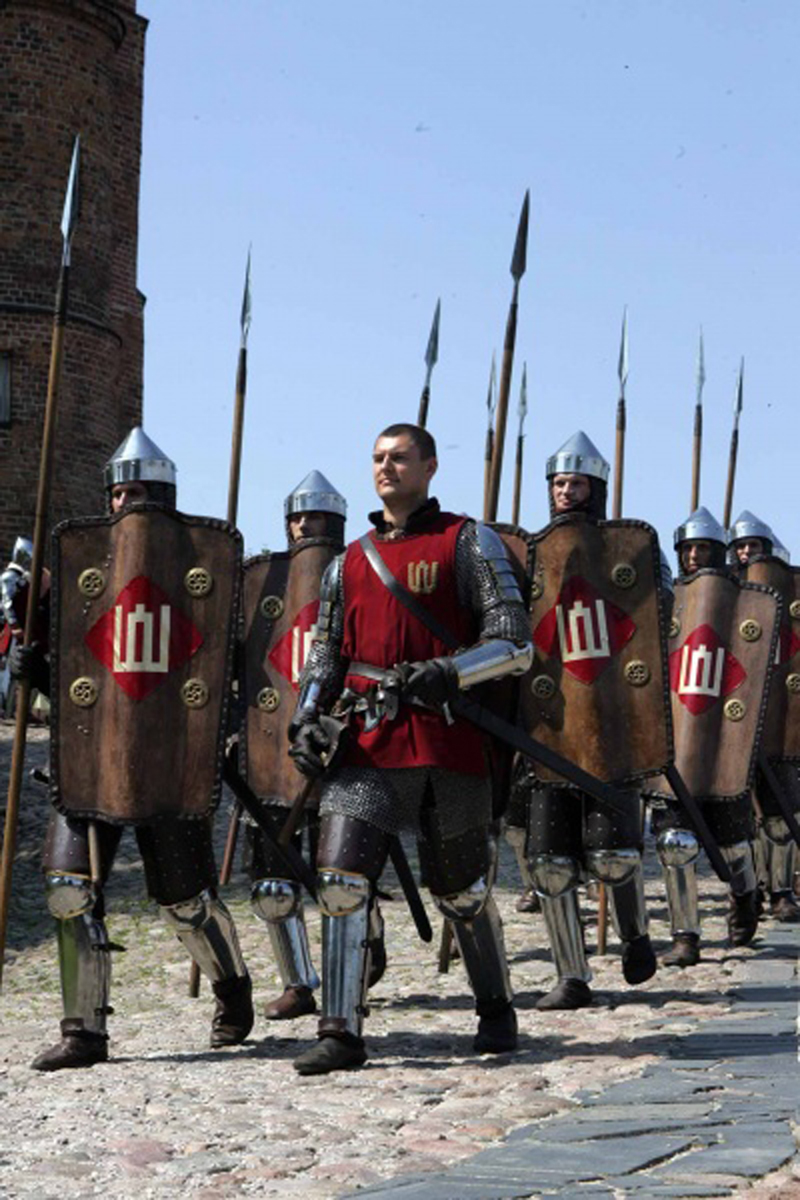
Lithuanian soldiers (14–15th century, reenactment)

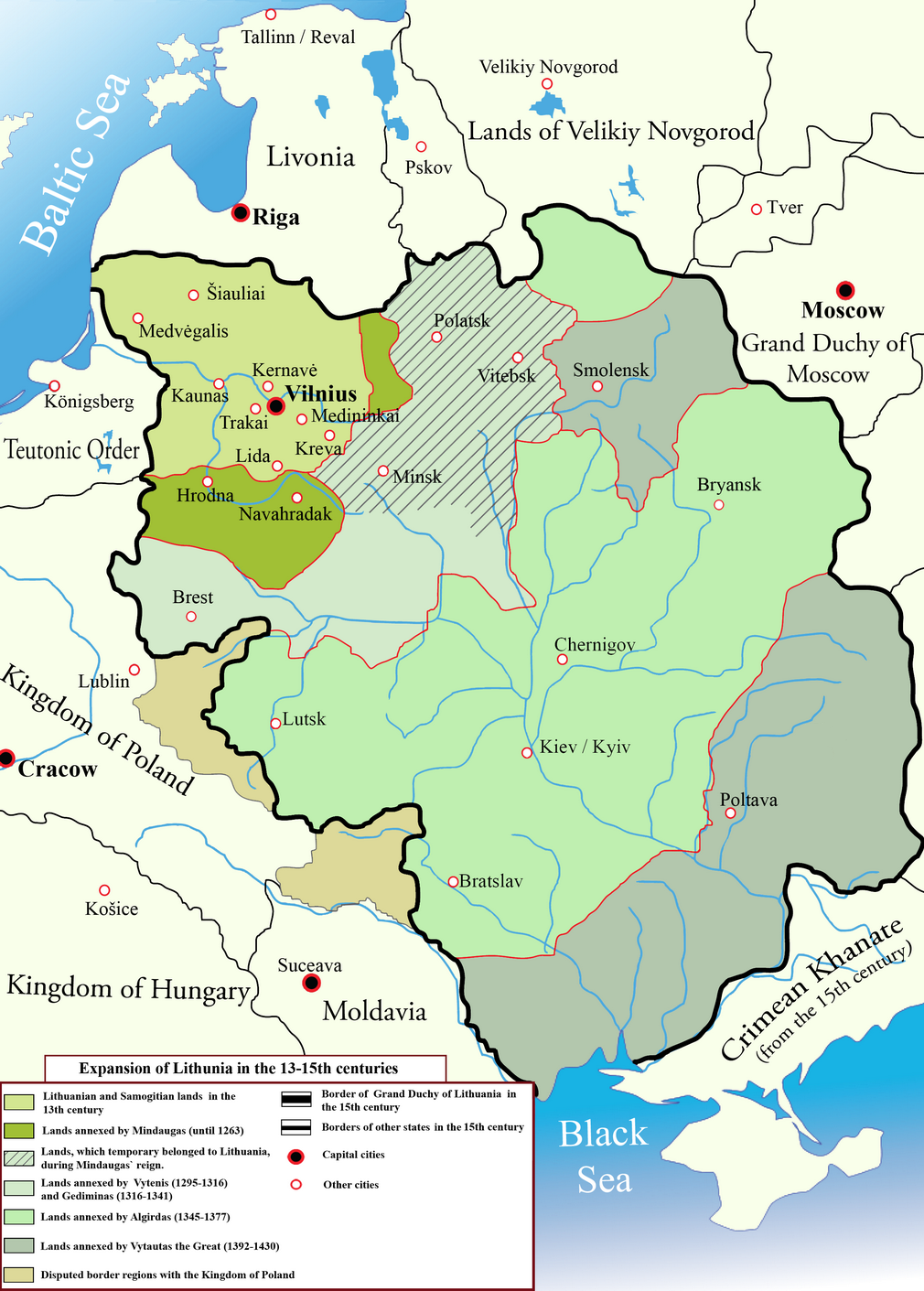
Extent of the Grand Duchy of Lithuania in the 13th–15th centuries.

Leičiai ([lɛɪˈt͡ɕɪɐɪ], lay-CHAI; singular: leitis, also spelled laičiai) were a distinct social group of Lithuanian society in the early Grand Duchy of Lithuania subordinate to the Lithuanian ruler or the state itself. Leičiai were native to the Lietuva Land and formed the core of the Lithuanian society in the pre-state era and during the establishment of the state. Leičiai made up the majority of the military-economic staff of the state: they enforced state authority in the periphery, protected state borders, and performed various other war-related functions, such as breeding riding horses. By the 15th and 16th centuries, leičiai were in decline, already losing some of their functions and prestige, and they disappeared as a social class after the implementation of the Volok Reform.

According to the hypothesis brought forward by Lithuanian historian Artūras Dubonis and linguist Simas Karaliūnas, the name of Lithuania (Lietuva) derived from leičiai. Leičiai is an old ethnonym used by Latvians to denote the Lithuanians (leiši in Latvian) and was historically known to the Germans in the same sense. Opponents to the hypothesis which attempts to relate the words leitis, leičiai and Lietuva, claim that the form leičiai, leitis, with a diphthong -ei- instead of -ie-, is likely to be of Western Baltic origin.

== Leičiai service ==
Leičiai were war-like servants of a ruler, the staff enforcing his authority. Their duties were likely war-related, among which possibly were breeding riding horses, providing roadmen, protecting state borders. They were a possession of the monarch, that is, subordinates to the state and not to nobles. The first mention of them in written sources is known from 1407, when Grand Duke Vytautas granted an estate and its staff, including leytey, to Manvydas, then an elder of Vilnius. Later Grand Dukes Alexander Jagiellon and Sigismund I the Old used to transfer royal estates to nobles for a temporary administration in exchange for cash, which was needed to finance continuous wars with the Grand Duchy of Moscow. These contracts are the major primary source on leičiai. Their name was rendered in various forms: leythey, leyty, leytten, litten, лейти, лейци, лейтеве, лойти, людей лейтъскихъ, etc. These forms are considered to be the same as in у Лейтахъ – in Leičiai (administrative area).

By the 15th century, this social group and their services were in decline. For example, one leitis from volost of Eišiškės, in a 1514 litigation against a minor landowner over his patrimonial plot, said that he was an "eternal leitis" (лейти звечный, leity zvechniy). From other sources of the first half of the 16th century, it is known that new people could not become leičiai although they could be accepted to perform the same services. Leičiai, unlike villeins, owned their patrimonial plots, had the right to relocate and return, and were accountable for performing their duties as brethren and not as households. After the Wallach Reform, leičiai became equal to other villeins and this distinct social group disappeared.

Leičiai were replaced by boyars.

== Hypothesis on etymology of Lietuva ==
=== Leičiai and Lietuva ===
The synonymy of the words leičiai and Lietuva is shown by the historical naming of one place near Anykščiai in the times of the Grand Duchy of Lithuania. Ten villages in Anykščiai volost was called Leičiai, Lietuva, also possibly Leituva: у Лейтахъ (1532; an example of Leičiai (as a place name) in writing); у войтовъстве Левътевскомъ (< Лейтевском; 1569), до Лейтовского рубежа (1545; possibly derived from Leituva); we … wojtowstwie Liejtowskim (1597); войтовъстве Летувъском (1595, 1597; derived from Lietuva or Lētuva). Lithuanian -i.e.- was rendered as -и- or -е- in writing, or as -е- if it was -ē- instead of -i.e.-. A case of rendering Karšuva place name as w Korszewie, Korszewska, Korszewski powiat (16th century) shows that Левътевскомъ (< Лейтевском) could be reconstructed as Leituva. The variant Lietuva or Lētuva was also old, for example, the form of the name of the same place from the end of the 14th century: a Hilgebeke [...] usque Borchwal, nomine Lettow (from Šventoji River up to the castle, of a name Lithuania). The location of this castle has been determined to be the Šeimyniškėliai hill fort. The word Lettow means Lithuania (compare, for example, an inscription of Jogaila's seal: Yagal, Dey gracia rex in Lettow; 1377–1386), the word 'castle' had maybe a meaning of the whole administrative area or volost.

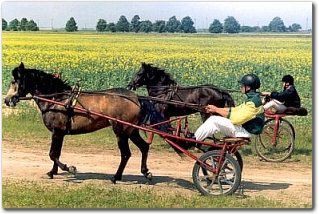
Žemaitukas - a historic horse breed from Lithuania. Known from the 6–7th centuries, it was used as a warhorse by the Lithuanians.

The ethnonymic meaning of leičiai, e.g. "Lithuanians", is known from several sources. This word is used by Latvians to name Lithuanians: leiši, sg. leitis. In Samogitian dialect there were words leičiuoti (to speak in other than Samogitian, or to speak in Aukštaitian dialect) and leičiukas, leičiūkas (person speaking in another dialect than Samogitian, has an accent). Compare, for example, with modern Lithuanian žemaičiuoti (to speak in the Samogitian dialect). In historical written sources, an important example is known from one participant of the Conference of Lutsk in 1429. John Steinkeller, who was a member of a council of Wrocław (Breslau), wrote in a letter addressed to his home town, that Sigismund, Holy Roman Emperor, was going to grant Vytautas the title of the King of Lithuanians: her wolde machen herczog Wytolten eynen konyng der Leytten. The word forms, which have meanings Lithuanian, Lithuanians, Lithuania and are most likely derived from the word leitis, are constantly found in the historical sources from the 14th and 15th centuries. For example, Lithuania is rendered as in writing as czwicshen Lythen und Prewssen (1415); as das land Litten with a further clarification that it was Aukštaitija in a narrative of a participant or witness of the Battle of Strėva. The ruler of Lithuanians was rendered as die Litischen konige in the chronicle of Wigand von Marburg. It seems that the presence of such forms with -ei- in Latvian (more known in a western part), German and Samogitian dialect itself has a high possibility that the forms could derive from Western Balts, but it is unclear why they have no suffix -uva / -ava.

Simas Karaliūnas claims that the word Lietuva had a meaning of bodyguard, retinue, attendant soldiery, troops. Such use is recorded, for example, in Russian sources: krestil knjazja Litovskago imenem Evnutija i ego družinu Litvu (baptized the duke of Lithuania Jaunutis and his retinue Lithuania); I pšišed posol Totui i vydal Korjadą i ego družinu Litvu knjazju velikomu Semenu Ivanovičiu (and came an envoy Totui and handed Karijotas and his retinue Lithuania over to Grand Duke Semyon Ivanovich). Karaliūnas accepts the synonymy of the words leičiai and Lietuva as proven and supposes that the word leitis, leičiai (< *leitiai) derives from the form *leitā, a synonym of *lietuvā, *leitavā, which, as it is shown above, had the meaning of armed retinue.

=== Place names and surnames ===
According to the hypothesis proposing the relation between leičiai and Lietuva, the name of Lietava, a small river which flows between Neris and Šventoji and which is the leading explanation for the origin of the name of Lithuania, should be an example of a toponym which was derived from leičiai. In the same area there is Rukla town, maybe relating with the name Ruklys, son of King Mindaugas, and it is thought that leičiai could have lived in an estate now known as Perelozai located by Lietava. Among place-names considered to be derived from the word leičiai are, for example, Leičiai / Laičiai, Leitiškės(/-iai), Laiteliai villages in Aukštaitija, Leičiai, Lietuva / Lētuva, Leitava area near Anykščiai, Leitkapiai (modern Mataitiškė, Nosaičiai), Laitikai (modern Laitekiai) placenames in Samogitia, etc. There are also surnames possibly derived from the word: Leita, Leitis, Leitanis, Leitanas, Leitonas, Leitėnas, Leičiūnas.

=== Criticism ===
The hypothesis deriving Lietuva from leičiai was not accepted by linguist Zigmas Zinkevičius, who claims that the diphthong -ei- shows a Curonian origin of the word leičiai and that the word laičiai (place name) could not possibly be derived from *leičiai. Dubonis' counterargument is that the use of such form is present in historical sources.

== In popular culture ==
In the video game Age of Empires II: Definitive Edition, the Leitis appears as the unique unit of the Lithuanian civilization as a cavalry unit whose attack ignores melee armor.
