= Lettow =

Lettow was a by-name given to a few Pomeranian nobles from a noble family from Vorbeck who went to assist Algirdas and Vytautas, the Great Dukes of Lithuania, in the 14th century. Lettow meant "Lithuania" in the Saxon language, and it appears in the General Prologue to The Canterbury Tales, wherein it is said of the Knight, a veteran of the Baltic Crusades: "Ful ofte tyme he hadde the bord bigonne / Aboven alle nacions in Pruce; / In Lettow hadde he reysed, and in Ruce, / No Cristen man so ofte of his degree."

With a few variants like Lettau, Lettaw, Litav, Littauer or Littawer, it was also adopted by some other Vorbe(c)ks in Pomerania as a surname. In Lithuania, later on, it was spelled Lettowt or Letowt, before the 20th century Lithuanian surname policy changed it to Letautas. John Lettou was a 15th-century bookbinder and printer in England, presumably a German from the Grand Duchy of Lithuania. Today, most people with the surname Lettow live in Germany and the United States, some in Holland as van Lettow, and a few in Austria, Latvia, the United Kingdom, South Africa, Canada, South America, and even in China (in the 20th century several Letowts lived and worked in Harbin and Shanghai).

== List of people with the surname Lettow ==
Chronologically the following people have had the surname Lettow:

- Ulryk Vorbek (c. 1215–1301), landowner of Wittow in the Duchy of Rügen/Rugia; Lüblow, south of Łebsko Lake, and Stara Wieś near Lębork. With his first wife Sabina Segebadin he had 3 sons: Adrian, Reimar and Achacy. From his second wife Adelgunda Warninin was son Eryk, the ancestor of all below mentioned:
- Maciej Vorbek-Lettow (1593–1668), born in Vilnius, Lithuania, medical doctor from the University of Padowa, major of Vilnius, for 19 years military medicus in Livonia for hetman (fieldmarshal) of Lithuania, prince Krzysztof Radziwiłł. After that he became the personal physician, secretary and treasury courtier of Władysław IV Vasa, king of Poland, Lithuania, Belarus, Ruthenia, Prussia, Sweden, Courland, Semigalia and Livonia. His memoirs were Skarbnica pamięci (Treasury of Memories). One of his sons:
  - Krzysztof-Zbigniew-Wiktoryn Lettow-Vorbek (1621–96), Nobility Marshal of Starodub district, Field Guard of Lithuania, king's secretary & treasury courtier for Lithuania, Colonel of Horse Cav.(with own Cossacks and Tatars Regiments), MP from Starodub, land judge, plus other functions and honors. His 2 sons were:
    - Henryk Lettow-Vorbeck, general and baron in Berlin.
    - Krystyn-Lucjan de Lettow, commander of Polish Royal Guards Horse Regiment. He had one son, Ludwik-Henryk Lettow-Vorbeck in Berlin, and two daughters, both of whom married Horse Royal Guards generals; one of the daughters, Zofia-Maria Lettow-Vorbeck, was the mother of Jan Henryk Dąbrowski (1755–1818), founder and chief commander of the Polish Legions in Italy under Napoleon, Senator-Voivode and Chief of the Army of Polish Kingdom; after him goes the Polish national anthem, "Mazurek Dąbrowskiego".
- Oskar von Lettow-Vorbeck (1839–1904), professor, general. He was a distinguished Prussian military scholar/writer on tactics at the Berlin Military Academy.
- Paul Karl von Lettow-Vorbeck (1832–1919), Prussian Army general from Węgorzyce. He was the father of:
  - Paul Emil von Lettow-Vorbeck (1870–1964), Prussian World War I general, called "The Lion of Africa". His grand daughter was Helene Duchess von Oldenburg (daughter of Graff Christian zu Rantzau & Heloise von Lettow-Vorbeck).
- Hans Albert von Lettow-Vorbeck (1901–1942), a World War II general, Commander of the 27th SS Volunteer Division Langemarck, nephew of Paul von Lettow-Vorbeck.
- Witold Letowt (1896–1973), colonel and medical doctor in the Polish Air Force. He was a RAF squadron leader during the Battle of Britain in World War II. He also was a sport pilot and member of the seven-men Polish rowing crew at the Berlin Olympics.

== See also ==
- German -ow suffix (at German Wikipedia)
- German toponymy
- Name of Lithuania
