= William de Machlinia =

English printer

William de Machlinia was an English printer who was active in the 15th century.

== Life ==
He was born in Malines (Mechelen) in the Low Countries. He moved to London where, from 1483, he worked as an independent printer.

== Career ==
Between 1483 and 1490, he printed twenty-four books. None of those are dated, though some contain his name and place of printing. He was responsible for the printing of the bull of Pope Innocent III, granting dispensation for the marriage of Henry VII of England and Elizabeth of York in March 1486.

William de Machlinia published in partnership with John Lettou, and they published mostly law books.

William de Machlinia also collaborated several times with Richard Pynson.
