= Sir Tryamour =

14th century English poem

Sir Tryamour is a Middle English romance dated to the late fourteenth century. The source is unknown and, like almost all of the Middle English romances to have survived, its author is anonymous. The 1,719-line poem is written in irregular tail rhyme stanzas composed in the Northeast Midlands dialect. There are textual ambiguities and obscurities that suggest corruption or "loose transmission." Consequently, interpretations, glosses and notes vary between editions, sometimes substantially.

== Plot summary ==
King Ardus of Aragon and his wife, Margaret, have no children, so he pledges to go on crusade in the hope that God will grant him an heir. A son is conceived the night before he leaves for the Holy Land, though neither of them know it. During the king's absence his steward, Marrok, attempts to seduce the queen, who firmly rejects him. In retaliation, when the king comes home Marrok tells him that the queen was unfaithful while he was gone and that the child is not his. The king exiles the pregnant queen without explanation, and she leaves court accompanied by an old knight, Sir Roger, and his dog, True-Love.

As they pass through the woods, Marrok and a company of his retainers attack the queen and Sir Roger who, despite his lack of armor, fights valiantly with the aid of True-Love but is killed. The dog tries to heal him and then buries him, refusing to leave his grave except for brief trips to the king's court in search of his master's killer. He finally finds Marrok and kills him, which reveals the steward's treachery to the king. Ardus hangs Marrok posthumously and gives him an ignominious burial. Sir Roger is buried with great honor, and True-Love remains at the gravesite until he dies.

The queen escapes Marrok's attack and makes her way to Hungary. She gives birth to a son, Tryamour, in the woods, and they are found by Sir Barnard, who takes them to his home where they are cared for and live for years. Ardus searches for the queen but can't find her, and is unaware he has a son.

In his youth, Tryamour wins his first joust; the prize is Helen, the seven-year-old heiress of the king of Hungary, her lands and her people. Immediately after her father's death civil war breaks out, and upon advice of her counselors a tournament is held to find a husband for Helen. He must be a strong and just ruler, able to inspire fear and respect in the people, and be of noble lineage or superlative prowess. She chooses Tryamour based on his victory against many powerful knights from diverse lands in the jousts.

After the tournament Tryamour removes his armor and is attacked by a jealous opponent whom Tryamour had defeated, Sir James, son of the emperor of Germany. Sir Barnard and King Ardus come to his aid, and Tryamour kills Sir James, but he is badly wounded and returns home to his mother to be healed. When Helen prepares to announce the victor and finds Tryamour gone, she will accept no one else and sets a two-year respite in which to search for him.

After recovering from his wounds, Tryamour asks his mother about his father's identity; she tells him he must first fulfill his responsibility to Helen, and he sets off seeking adventures. When the emperor learns of his son's death, he swears vengeance on Ardus and Tryamour and besieges the king's lands. The emperor and Ardus agree to settle the conflict through a combat between champions at a day set, and the siege is halted. Ardus trusts that he will be defended by Tryamour but can't find him.

Coincidentally, Tryamour goes into Aragon and gets caught poaching deer. Rather than pay the penalty of losing his right hand, he kills the foresters. In need of a champion, when the king hears about a man of such prowess, he has him brought to the court. Ardus recognizes Tryamour, and when he tells him of his plight that has resulted from the killing of Sir James, Tryamour agrees to challenge the emperor's champion, Moradas. While awaiting the day of combat, Ardus and Tryamour spend time together at sport and pleasure. When the hiatus ends and before the battle begins, Ardus knights Tryamour. The king also offers to make him his heir, but Tryamour defers the subject until a later time. Tryamour wins the combat after a fierce battle and wins great honor, then remains for some time with the king, who gives him many rich gifts, kisses him upon their parting, and repeats his intention to make him his heir.

Tryamour travels to many lands, winning fame for his victories in combat. When he tries to return to Hungary, his way is blocked by two brothers who guard the pass, waiting for Tryamour in order to avenge the death of their brother Moradas. They inform Tryamour that their other brother, Burlond, intends to marry Helen and is attacking her lands and barons. If she does not find a champion by a certain day, she will have to marry the giant Burlond.

Tryamour kills the two brothers, goes to Hungary, and meets and defeats Burlond by dismembering him. Helen greets Tryamour and grants him her love, her barons acknowledge him as their lord, and the wedding day is set. Having successfully defended Helen and her land, Tryamour sends for his mother and asks again about his father. She tells him it is King Ardus and how she had been exiled without explanation, and that they had been fostered by Sir Barnard. Tryamour invites Ardus to his wedding, and after the ceremony and his coronation as king there is a great feast. Ardus and Margaret are seated together but he doesn't recognize her. She identifies herself and relates her story, after which they are blissfully reunited. Ardus acknowledges Tryamour as his son, and he and Margaret return home to Aragon and live happily. Tryamour and Helen also live joyfully together and have two sons. When Ardus dies, Tryamour names his younger son his father's successor.

== Themes and motifs ==
Sir Tryamour is a straightforward, relatively swift episodic narrative. The ornately detailed descriptions, supernatural elements and intense romantic relationships found in many romances are minimal or absent, while there is a focus on marital and familial relationships. The poem is composed of a number of literary and folktale themes and motifs common to Middle English romance, including separation and reunion, the knight in search of his unknown father, the need for an heir, the wrongly accused queen, the traitorous steward, the winning of a bride through combat, the seeking of knightly adventures and renown, and the display of prowess. Critics compare Sir Tryamour to other romances with similar themes, such as the search for a father in King Horn and Sir Degare, and the calumniated queen in Octavian, although many of the themes listed above may be found in a number of other romances, such as Ywain and Gawain, Sir Launfal, Havelok and Sir Amadace.

There are several types of situations that require combat: jousts and tournaments; judicial and challenge combats; attacks on protagonists; hostile sieges; and civil war. Some critics observe that martial combat dominates the romance and distinguishes it from others, but chivalric adventures involving the testing and use of prowess are common in romance. The seeming prevalence of combat may be attributed to the perceived lack of development of romantic relationships, causing an imbalance compared to other romances, and to the number of opponents faced by the hero, which is perhaps notable because they are individualized.

Based on generic expectations, critics and readers familiar with romance may observe an underdevelopment of love in Sir Tryamour. However, the Tryamour-poet presents a range of love relationships, selfish and selfless, such as marital devotion, parental and familial love, lustful desire, and (especially) love between animal and master. The absence of romantic love between Helen and Tryamour could be attributed to the poet's concentration on combat at the expense of romantic love, but this is difficult to support considering the attention paid to Ardus and Margaret's relationship. There is another possible interpretation: that the relationship between Helen and Tryamour is defined not by romance but by pragmatism that fulfills their respective needs and goals.

In the predecessors of Middle English romances, the twelfth-century courtly narratives such as Breton lais by Marie de France, love often examines "the individual's recognition of a need for self-fulfillment and his or her struggle for the freedom to satisfy that need." Hanning and Ferrante note that the "portrayal of love as a means for exploring the interaction of self and society, appearance and reality" passes continuously from the twelfth-century courtly narrative to the twentieth-century novel. In fourteenth-century romances, which participate in that flow, characters define themselves by fulfilling societal expectations.

Hanning and Ferrante use the romances of Chrétien de Troyes to suggest that while the protagonists experience "gradual discovery of real values through love," the courtly romances also "amused their audience and challenged it to discover deeper meanings through characters and behaviour and the representation of attitudes." In both the Old French and Middle English romances, that discovery may be initiated by a love relationship, but it is usually achieved through chivalric adventure. Like love, combat is a means for self-discovery and improvement through the internalization of values needed for personal and social integrity. As noted by Hudson, Sir Tryamour differs from the pattern in the characters' lack of spiritual growth through adventure, but it conforms by offering the audience the opportunity for edification.

Sir Tryamour features didactic themes of moral and cultural relevance found in romance and other genres such as complaint and protest literature, particularly trouthe, which includes the interrelated concepts of loyalty, fidelity, honesty, integrity, the keeping of promises and oaths, and justness and innocence. Sir Tryamour is also concerned with the social values of knighthood, kingship, and kinship relationships.

== Critical studies ==
- Pearsall, Derek. "The Development of Middle English Romance." Mediaeval Studies 27 (1965): 91-116.
- Ramsey, Lee C. Chivalric Romances: Popular Literature in Medieval England. Bloomington: Indiana UP, 1983. 162-65.
- There are few extensive studies of Sir Tryamour, which may be attributed to several factors: the lack of editions, the corruption of the text, the use of stock themes, and a disparagement of the literary quality. Fellows, for example, finds that "stylistically Sir Tryamour leaves much to be desired." While Pearsall considers the poem a "rehash of conventional motifs," he finds it "skilful" and the plot "quite intricate."
- The use of a number of stock themes is common to most romances; in fact, it was expected in order to validate the poem as authentic through the use of previous works and/or tales, and the concept of plagiarism was unknown. The poet's skill is demonstrated in his ability to weave the themes into a meaningful work that would both entertain and instruct the audience. Sir Tryamour was apparently successful judging by its popularity, being reprinted into the sixteenth century.
- Opinion is divided over the assessment of Middle English romances, which have traditionally been categorized as "courtly," meaning of high quality and appealing to the aristocracy, and "popular," of lesser quality aimed at the lower classes. This has been reevaluated in recent years, but Sir Tryamour may be caught in the cycle of "popular" works considered to be of inferior quality compared to more sophisticated poems. Regardless of its source, the lacuna in critical study of Sir Tryamour should invite scholars' attention to this overlooked poem.

== Manuscripts ==
- Cambridge University Library Ff. 2.38, mid-fifteenth century
- Bodleian MS (Rawlinson), sixteenth century, fragment
- Percy Folio MS British Library Add. 27879, c. 1642-50

== Editions ==
- Bishop Percy's Folio Manuscript: Ballads and Romances. Vol. II. Ed. John W. Hales and Frederick J. Furnivall. London: 1868. 78-135.
- The Romance of Syr Tryamoure. Ed. James Orchard Halliwell. London: Percy Society, 1846.
- Syr Tryamowre: A Metrical Romance. Ed. Anna Johanna Schmidt. Utrecht: Broekhoff, 1937.
- Syr Tryamowre. Of Love and Chivalry: An Anthology of Middle English Romance. Ed. Jennifer Fellows. London: J.M. Dent, 1993.
- Sir Tryamour. Four Middle English Romances. Ed. Harriet Hudson. TEAMS Middle English Texts Series. Kalamazoo: Medieval Institute Publications, 1996.

There were at least two early printed editions of Sir Tryamour in the mid-sixteenth century by Willyam Copland. The earliest is preserved in the British Museum, and the later at the Bodleian Library in Oxford. The Percy MS appears to derive from Copland's editions, as may the Rawlinson fragment. Fragments have also been found in two sixteenth-century printed editions, including one by Wynkyn de Worde and one by Richard Pynson.

== Suggested readings ==
The following readings are suggested for general background of Middle English romances and the culture in which they were created.

- Barron, W. R. J. English Medieval Romance. London: Longman, 1987.
- Barber, Richard. The Knight and Chivalry. Woodbridge: The Boydell Press, 1970. Rev. 1995.
- Bloch, R. Howard and Stephen G. Nichols, eds. Medievalism and the Modernist Temper. Baltimore: Johns Hopkins UP, 1996.
- Coss, Peter. The Knight in Medieval England 1000-1400. Conshohocken, PA: Combined Books, 1996.
- Crane, Susan. Insular Romance: Politics, Faith, and Culture in Anglo-Norman and Middle English Literature. Berkeley: U of California P, 1986.
- Goldberg, P. J. P. Medieval England: A Social History 1250-1550. London: Hodder Arnold, 2004.
- Green, Richard Firth. A Crisis of Truth: Literature and Law in Ricardian England. Philadelphia: U of Pennsylvania P, 1999.
- Keen, Maurice. England in the Later Middle Ages. London: Routledge, 1973.
- —. Chivalry. New Haven: Yale UP, 1984.
- Knight, Stephen. "The Social Function of the Middle English Romances." Medieval Literature: Criticism, Ideology, and History. Ed. David Aers. Brighton, Sussex: Harvester Press Ltd, 1986. 99-122.
- McDonald, Nicola. Pulp Fictions of Medieval England. Manchester: Manchester UP, 2004.
- McKisack, May. The Fourteenth Century 1307-1399. Oxford: Clarendon Press, 1959.
- Mehl, Dieter. The Middle English Romances of the Thirteenth and Fourteenth Centuries. London: Routledge and Kegan Paul, 1967.
- Mills, Maldwyn, Jennifer Fellows, et al., eds. Romance in Medieval England. Cambridge: D. S. Brewer, 1991.
- Pearsall, Derek. "The Development of Middle English Romance." Studies in Medieval English Romances: Some New Approaches. Ed. Derek Brewer. Cambridge: D. S. Brewer, 1988. 11-35.
- Putter, Ad, and Jane Gilbert, eds. The Spirit of Medieval English Popular Romance. Harlow: Pearson Education Limited, 2000.
- Robertson, D. W. Essays in Medieval Culture. Princeton: Princeton UP, 1980.
- Saunders, Corinne, ed. Cultural Encounters in the Romance of Medieval England. Cambridge: D. S. Brewer, 2005.
