= John Lettou =

John Lettou or John of Lithuania (Lithuanian: Jonas Lietuvis, fl. 1475–1483) was an English bookbinder and printer, presumably Lithuanian from the Grand Duchy of Lithuania.

Seventeen books printed between 1475 and 1480 are attributed to the workshop of the ‘Indulgence Binder’ now identified as Lettou. The identification depends upon the use of waste strips cut from an indulgence of 1480 used in the binding of a Bible, printed by Gotz in 1480, which now belongs to Jesus College, Cambridge. Since this waste would have been found only in the workshop of the printer, and the indulgence was printed by Lettou, he must have been both the printer and the binder. John Lettou also published in partnership with William de Machlinia and they published mostly law books.

== See also ==
- List of Lithuanians
- Name of Lithuania
- Lettow
