= Name of Lithuania =

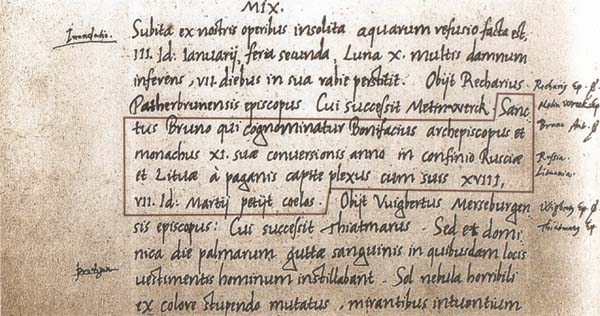
Earliest mention of Lithuania (Litua, on line 7) in the entry for 1009 in the 11th-century Annals of Quedlinburg, Dresden, Sächsische Landesbibliothek, Q.113, fol 31r.

The first known record of the name of Lithuania (Lithuanian: Lietuva) was recorded in the Annals of Quedlinburg (Latin: Annales Quedlinburgenses, written between 1008 and 1030) in a story recording events of 9 March 1009 concerning Saint Bruno. The Chronicle recorded in the form Litua (in the phrase "in confinio Rusciæ et Lituæ a paganis capite plexus"). Although it is clear the name originated from a Baltic language, scholars still debate the meaning of the word.

== Historic usage ==
During the 13th century the Duchy of Lithuania was bordered by Slavic lands. The Slavs did not create the name; they used the existing Lithuanian ethnonym. The Lithuanian diphthong -ie- has, in Slavic languages, shifted to the vowel -i- (и), and the short -u- became extra-short (reduced) -ŭ- (ъ) which, being unstressed, later disappeared from the East Slavic, hence Litva. This is evidence that the Slavs borrowed this ethnonym from Lithuanians a long time ago.

During the next century, Lithuania's name was recorded in other languages, including German and Polish. In early German chronicles Lithuania's name was spelled Lettowen. In this form the German letter -e- is used to denote the Lithuanian diphthong -ie-, while -owen denotes the Lithuanian hydronymic suffix -uva (-ava). The traditional Lithuanian root -liet- is encountered in various German terms of the era, such as Lettowen, and in Latin as Lethovia, Lettovia, Lettavia, etc. For example, after becoming the ruler of Lithuania, Grand Duke Algirdas appeared as the King of Lithuania (Latin: rex Letwinorum) in the Livonian Chronicles.

In the Rus' chronicles, Lithuania's name was written as Литъва, alongside a shortened version, Литва (Litva), where -i- (и) was already used instead of the diphthong -ie. All of these names clearly originated from *Lētuvā > Lietuva, forms used by Lithuanians to identify their lands. The current form of the name Lietuva is thought to have been used by Lithuanians since the 12th or 13th century, but there are no written sources of that time, as the oldest existing manuscript in the Lithuanian language is dated back to the 16th century. Despite ample historic and linguistic evidence with regard to the name's usage in different languages, there is a certain degree of debate about the etymology of the name.

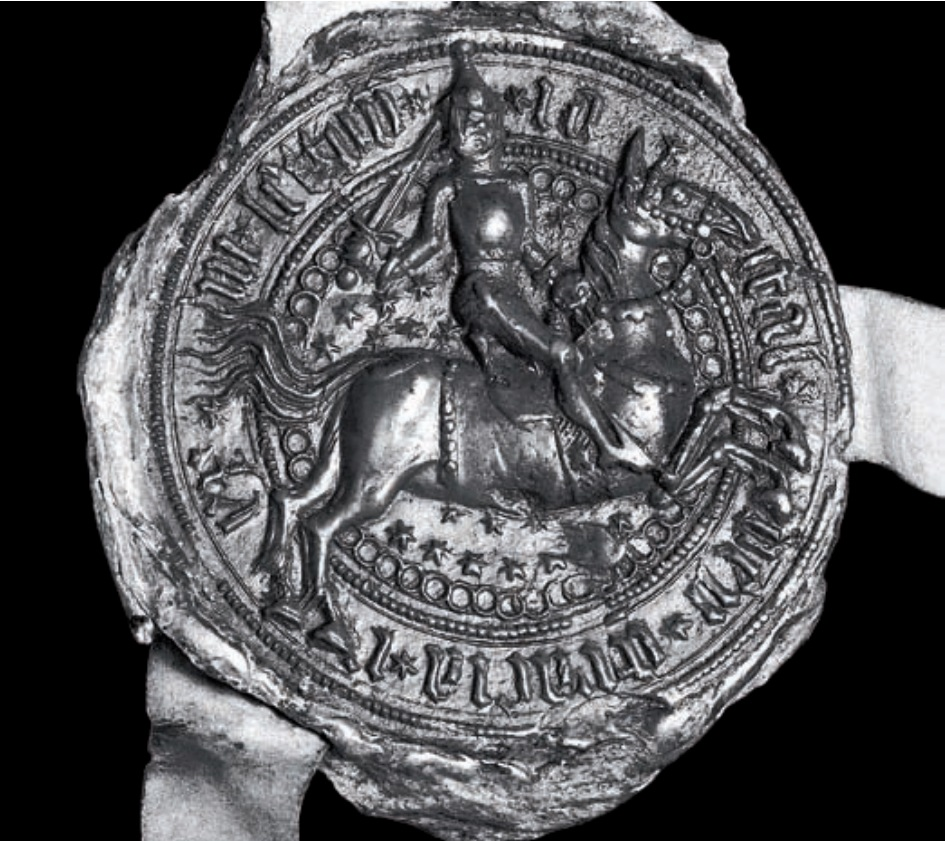
Jogaila's seal with text ✶ ia ‚ gal ✶ - dey ✶ gracia ✶ r - ex - in ✶ lettow (1382)

The regalia of Grand Duke Gediminas did not survive; however, it is known that in 1323 Gediminas sent 7 letters from his castle in Vilnius that also did not survive. Therefore, with them the Seal of Gediminas was also lost. Nevertheless, the letter's content is known from a transcript as on 1 July 1323 notary (John of Bremen) in the city of Lübeck confirmed a transcript of a 26 May 1323 letter of Gediminas and also described in detail the oval waxy seal which was attached to the letter. According to the notary's transcript, the oval Seal of Gediminas had a twelve corners edging, at the middle of the edging was an image of a man with long hair, who sat on a throne and held a crown (or a wreath) in his right hand and a sceptre in his left hand, moreover, a cross was engraved around the man along with a Latin inscription: S DEI GRACIA GEDEMINNI LETHWINOR ET RUTKENOR REG (English: Gediminas', by the grace of God, the King of the Lithuanians and the Rus' people, seal). Authentic Jogaila's seal from 1382 has a Latin text: ✶ ia ‚ gal ✶ – dey ✶ gracia ✶ r – ex – in ✶ lettow (English: Jogaila, by the grace of God, King in Lithuania).

Lithuania was also called the Republic of Lithuania (Latin: Respublica Lituana) since at least the mid-16th century, already before the Union of Lublin in 1569.

Following the Union of Lublin, the Lithuanians and Grand Dukes of Lithuania also called the Grand Duchy of Lithuania the Lithuanian Republic and considered it a separate entity from the Crown of the Kingdom of Poland.

In a Lithuanian language panegyric to Sigismund III Vasa in 1589, the genitive case of the Grand Duchy of Lithuania is Lietuwos. The Grand Duchy of Lithuania is referred to as dides Kunigiſtes Lietuwos in Lithuanian within a religious Christian book from 1653.

The name of the Grand Duchy of Lithuania in Lithuanian

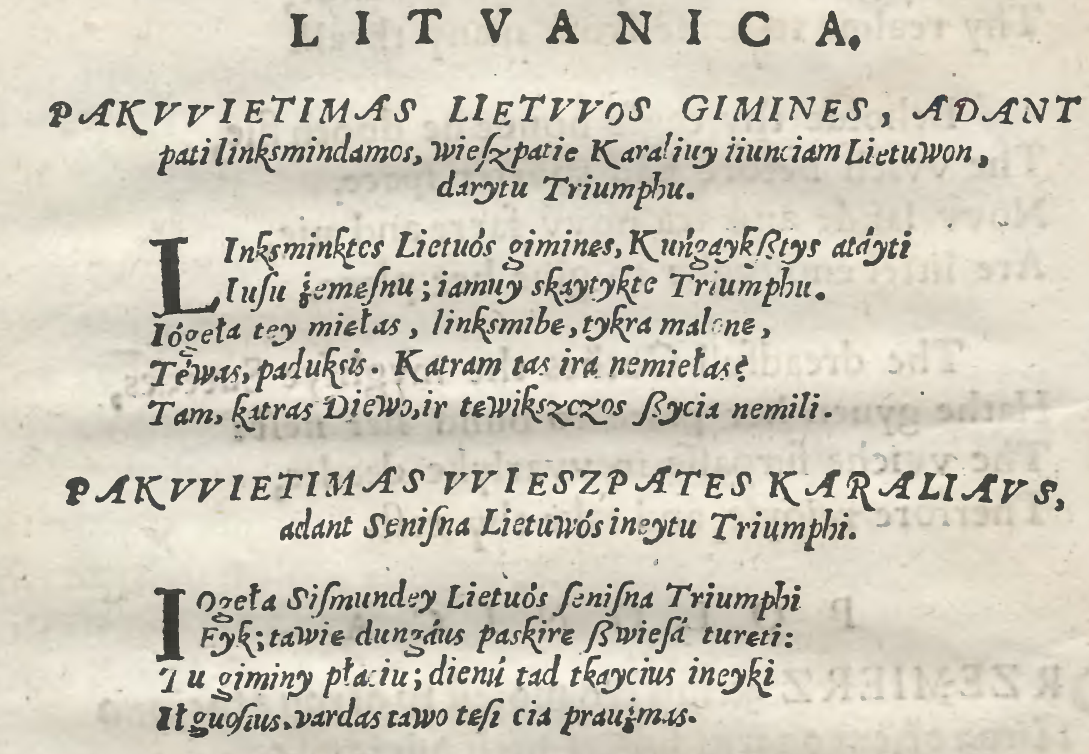
Lithuanian panegyric to the Lithuanian Grand Duke in AD 1589, where the genitive case of the name of Lithuanian state is Lietuwos

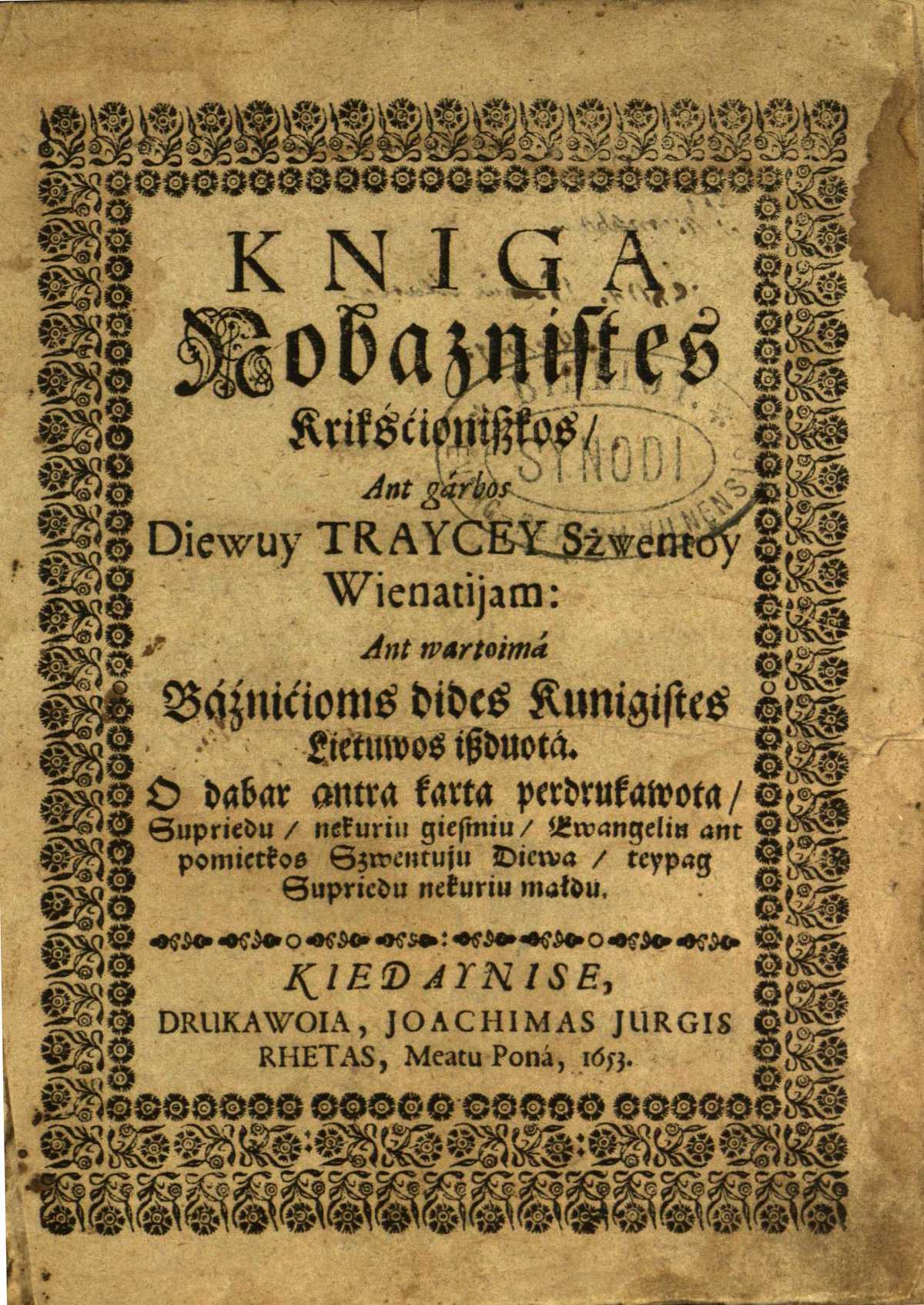
The Grand Duchy of Lithuania is called dides Kunigiſtes Lietuwos on the cover of a Christian religious book from AD 1653

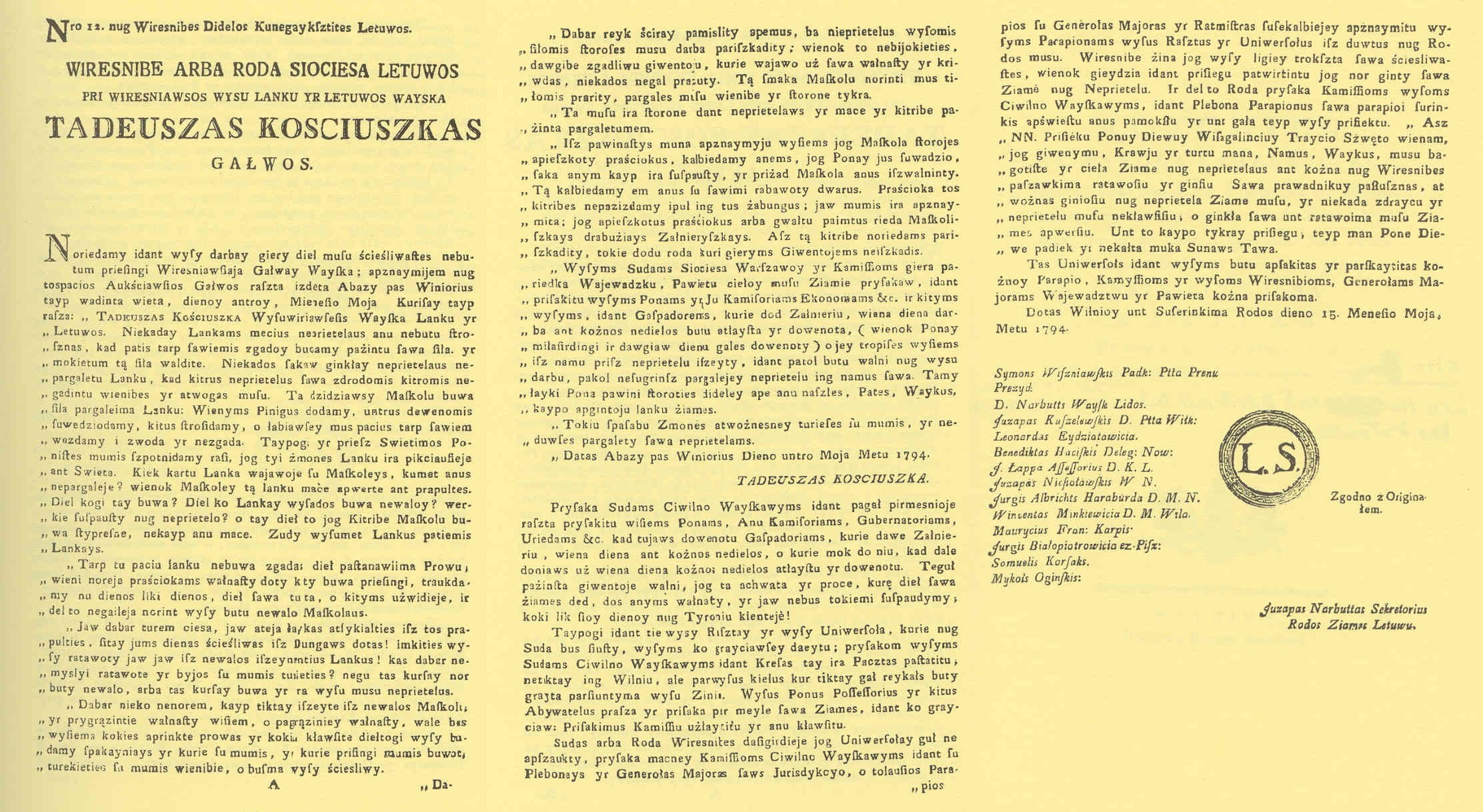
Tadeusz Kościuszko's manifesto distributed during the Kościuszko Uprising in capital Vilnius and further in Lithuania, referring to the state as Didelos Kunegaykſztites Letuwos, 1794

== Etymology ==
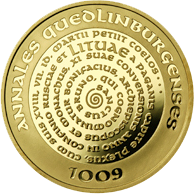
100 litas gold commemorative coin dedicated to the millennium of Lithuania's name, minted in 2007

There have been several attempts to associate Lietuva with Celtic toponyms, and with Latin or Italian words, but these attempts all lack strong linguistic support. According to a widespread popular belief, the word Lietuva (Lithuania) originated from the Lithuanian words lyti (to rain) and lietus (rain). However, there is no serious scientific support for this theory. Since the word Lietuva has a suffix (-uva), the original word should have no suffix. A likely candidate is Lietā. Because many Baltic ethnonyms originated from hydronyms, linguists have searched for its origin among local hydronyms. Usually such names evolved through the following process: hydronym → toponym → ethnonym.

A small river not far from Kernavė, the core area of the early Lithuanian state and a possible first capital of the would-be Grand Duchy of Lithuania, is usually credited as the source of the name. This river's original name is Lietava. As time passed, the suffix -ava could have changed into -uva, as the two are from the same suffix branch. The river flows in the lowlands and easily spills over its banks, therefore the traditional Lithuanian form liet- could be directly translated as lietis (to spill), of the root derived from the Proto-Indo-European *leyǝ-. However, the river is very small and some find it improbable that such a small and local object could have lent its name to an entire nation. On the other hand, such a fact is not unprecedented in world history.

While the word's etymology continues to be debated, scientists agree that the primary origins of the ethnonym were the Lithuanian forms *Lētuvā/Lietuva, which were then used by different languages, including Slavic. It is very unlikely for the name to have derived from a Slavic language, since the Slavic -i- (и) could never be transliterated into the Lithuanian diphthong -ie-.

Among other etymologies of the name of Lithuania is Artūras Dubonis's hypothesis, that Lietuva relates to the word *leičiai (plural of leitis, a social group in the early Grand Duchy of Lithuania). The word leičiai is still used as an ethnonym for Lithuanians, usually poetically or in historical contexts, in the Latvian language, which is closely related to Lithuanian.

== See also ==
- Lettow
- John Lettou
