= Lietava (Neris) =

Rivulet in Lithuania believed to give Lithuania its name

Coordinates: 55°1′29″N 24°27′30″E

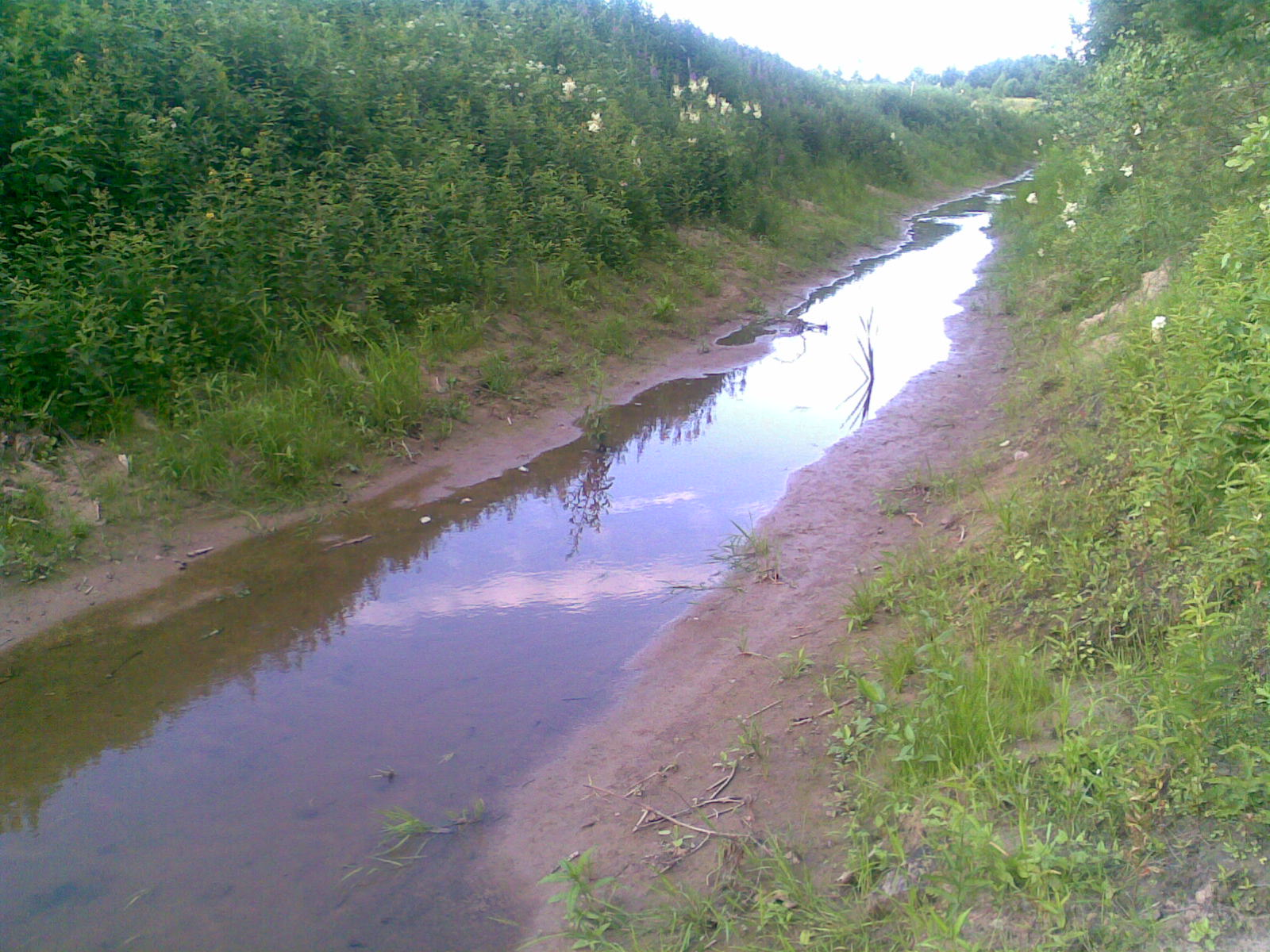
- Lietava in Perelozai village

Location
- Country: Lithuania

Physical characteristics
- Source
  - location: Upninkai surroundings
- Mouth
  - location: Neris
- Length: 11 km (6.8 mi)

Lietava, Lietauka or Letauka, is a rivulet in Lithuania that is believed to have given Lithuania its name. It is 11 km in length and flows into Neris 30 km away from Kernavė, a possible first capital of the Grand Duchy of Lithuania. It flows through a swampy region and no important archaeological findings have been discovered on its banks. Since the stream flows in the lowlands and easily spills over its banks, most linguists agree that Lithuania's name (Lietuva) is related, and perhaps derived from Lithuanian verb lieti (to spill), of the root derived from the Proto-Indo-European *leyǝ-.

Since many names in Indo-European languages are derived from hydronyms, scientists had been looking for a body of water matching the name of Lithuania, Lietuva. Kazys Kuzavinis identified Lietauka as a possible candidate and popularized the hypothesis. The original name of Lietauka must have been Lietava. That name was later Slavicised by Old Believers expelled from the Russian Empire and established on the banks of the river, as Litavka, and phonetically reversed to Lithuanian as Lietauka by local Lithuanians.

== See also ==
- Rivers of Lithuania
