= Lithuanian land confederation =

The Lithuanian land confederation (Lithuanian: Lietuvių žemių konfederacija) was a political union between the early dukes of Lithuania that constituted the transition to the early feudal Lithuanian state. It was part of a larger trend in the 13th century of various Baltic tribes forming land confederations, albeit none gave rise to individual Baltic states such as the Grand Duchy of Lithuania. (Note: It is known that the Semigallians, Yotvingians, and Prussians had formed their own land confederations, but failed to consolidate due to invading crusading forces; the people of those tribes eventually migrated into Lithuania. Similarly, the Curonians never formed a land confederation due to constant attacks by the vikings and Samogitians.) This period also marked the emergence of the allod, wherein an individual family would own land, replacing communal land ownership. It would be another key factor in the emerging unification of the Lithuanian tribes.

Map of Baltic tribes ca. 13th century. The Eastern Balts are shown in brown hues, the Western Balts in green.

== Formation ==
According to historians, the main reason for the formation of the land confederation was the transition of tribal nobility into landed lords called kunigai, who were backed by their own standing armies. The strongest of these landed lords consolidated their hegemony and became senior dukes with their own duchies. These dukes headed the land confederation, which covered the lands of ethnic Lithuanians. The Lithuanians were also in an advantageous position due to the state of the nearby fractured and weak Slavic duchies; attacks from Lithuania increased the power of the Lithuanian dukes.

== History ==
The land confederation's core belonged to the historical land of Lithuania and possibly southern Nalšia. At first, the most prominent of the confederation's senior dukes were Dangerutis and Steksė. However, they died in fights with the Livonian Brothers of the Sword, and so their place was taken by five other dukes (representing three families): Živinbudas, Daujotas with Viligaila and Dausprungas with Mindaugas. They controlled the areas of Kuleiniai, Laukuva, Tverai, Ariogala, Betygala, Raseiniai, Šiauliai, Upytė, Deltuva, Neris, east and north Nalšia, and Karšuva, which had their own respective lesser dukes. These lesser and senior dukes were the signatories of the Galicia-Volhynia Treaty of 1219, the primary source of the land confederation. Also subordinate to the confederation's command were Gerdenis and Daumantas, dukes of Polotsk and Pskov respectively.

It is known that in some cases, such as in 1207, the confederation's entire army was raised, though usually local ducal armies sufficed. After the death of Dausprungas, Mindaugas became head of the family and dealt with political enemies, consolidating power, thus becoming Grand Duke and eventually, King of Lithuania.

== See also ==
- History of Lithuania
