= History of Lithuania (1219–1295) =

The history of Lithuania between 1219 and 1295 concerns the establishment and early history of the first Lithuanian state, the Grand Duchy of Lithuania. The beginning of the 13th century marks the end of the prehistory of Lithuania. From this point on the history of Lithuania is recorded in chronicles, treaties, and other written documents. In 1219, 21 Lithuanian dukes signed a peace treaty with Galicia–Volhynia. This event is widely accepted as the first proof that the Baltic tribes were uniting and consolidating. Despite continuous warfare with two Christian orders, the Livonian Order and the Teutonic Knights, the Grand Duchy of Lithuania was established and gained some control over the lands of Black Ruthenia, Polotsk, Minsk, and other territories east of modern-day Lithuania that had become weak and vulnerable after the collapse of Kievan Rus'.

The first ruler to hold the title of Grand Duke was Mindaugas. Traditionally he is considered the founder of the state, the one who united the Baltic tribes and established the Duchy. Some scholars, however, challenge this perception, arguing that an organized state existed before Mindaugas, possibly as early as 1183. After quelling an internal war with his nephews, Mindaugas was baptized in 1251, and was crowned as King of Lithuania in 1253. In 1261, he broke the peace with the Livonian Order, perhaps even renouncing Christianity. His assassination in 1263 by Treniota ended the early Christian kingdom in Lithuania. For another 120 years Lithuania would remain a pagan empire, fighting against the Teutonic and Livonian Orders during the Northern Crusades during their attempts to Christianize the land.

After Mindaugas' death, the Grand Duchy of Lithuania entered times of relative instability, as reflected by the fact that seven Grand Dukes held the title over the course of the next 32 years. Little is known about this period, but the Gediminid dynasty was founded in about 1280. Despite the instability, the Grand Duchy did not disintegrate. Vytenis assumed power in 1295, and during the next 20 years laid solid foundations for the Duchy to expand and grow under the leadership of Gediminas and his son Algirdas. While the Grand Duchy was established between 1219 and 1295, the years after 1295 marked its expansion.

== Establishment of the state ==
=== Baltic unification ===
Map of Baltic tribes ca. 13th century. The Eastern Balts are shown in brown hues, the Western Balts in green.

The Balts were largely driven to unite by external threats from aggressive German religious orders. In 1202, the Order of the Livonian Brothers of the Sword was established by Albert, the Bishop of Riga, to promote the Christianization and conquest of the Livonians, Curonians, Semigallians, and Estonians near the Gulf of Riga. The Order waged a number of successful campaigns and posed a great danger to the Lithuanians. The Order's progress was halted by its defeat at the Battle of Saule in 1236, after which it almost collapsed. The following year, it merged into the Teutonic Knights.

In 1226, Konrad I of Masovia invited the Teutonic Knights to defend his borders and subdue the Prussians, offering the Knights the use of Chełmno (Kulm) as a base for their campaign. In 1230, they settled in Chełmno, built a castle, and began attacking Prussian lands. After 44 years, and despite two Prussian uprisings against them, they had conquered most of the Prussian tribes. Afterwards, the Knights spent nine years conquering the Nadruvians, Skalvians, and Yotvingians, and from 1283, they were better positioned to threaten the young Lithuanian state from the west.

Further unification of the Lithuanian tribes was facilitated by the social changes that took place in Lithuania during this period. Private land ownership was established (allodiums, Lithuanian: atolai), which would later evolve into a feudal system. As attested by many chronicles, it was the principal form of organization governing land ownership in the 13th century. Under this system, known in England as primogeniture, only the eldest son could inherit lands, which allowed dukes to consolidate their holdings. Social classes and divisions of labor also began taking shape. There were classes of experienced soldiers (bajoras), of free peasants (laukininkas), and of "unfree" people (kaimynas and šeimynykštis). In order to enforce this social structure, a united state was needed. Another force behind unification was the desire to take advantage of Ruthenian lands, which were suffering from the Mongol invasion. Temporary alliances among Lithuanian dukes often sufficed for military ventures into, and plundering of, these lands (including Pskov, plundered in 1213). Altogether, between 1201 and 1236, Lithuanians launched at least 22 incursions into Livonia, 14 into Rus, and 4 into Poland. The ongoing administration of conquered territories, however, required a strong and unified central power.

=== Galicia–Volhynia Treaty ===
Map of territories controlled by the Livonian Order in 1260. The Order, established in 1202, posed a great danger to the Balts, which encouraged unification.

Some evidence suggests that Lithuanians began combining their forces at the dawn of the 13th century. For example, in 1207, soldiers were recruited across Lithuania to fight the German religious orders, and in 1212, Daugirutis' treaty with Novgorod shows that he exerted some degree of influence over a vast area. During the first twenty years of the 13th century, Lithuanians organized some thirty military expeditions to Livonia, Rus', and Poland. Historian Tomas Baranauskas argues that a Lithuanian state could be said to exist as early as 1183.

However, the first conclusive evidence that the Balts were uniting is considered to be the treaty with Galicia–Volhynia signed in 1219. The treaty's signatories include 21 Lithuanian dukes; it specifies that five of those were elder and thus took precedence over the remaining sixteen. Presumably, the eldest Duke was Živinbudas, since his name was mentioned first. Mindaugas, despite his youth, and his brother Dausprungas, are listed among the elder dukes. That would imply that they inherited their titles.

The treaty is important for several reasons. It shows that the Lithuanian Dukes were co-operating; the signatories include Dukes who ruled lands such as Samogitia, which probably had no contact with Galicia–Volhynia. Their participation implies a perception of common interest, an indication of a nascent state. However, the designation of five Dukes as "elder" shows that the process of unification was still in transition. The inclusion of 21 Dukes indicates that the various lands in Lithuania were powerful and semi-independent. Historians consider the treaty an interesting documentation of the long and complex process of a state's formation. The progress of unification was uneven; for example, after the deaths of Dukes Daugirutis in 1213 and Stekšys in 1214, fewer raids were organized by Lithuanians.

=== Rise of Mindaugas ===
Mindaugas, the duke who governed southern Lithuania between the Neman and Neris Rivers, eventually became the founder of the state. Mindaugas is referred to as the ruler of all Lithuania in the Livonian Rhymed Chronicle in 1236. The means by which he managed to acquire this title are not well known. Rus' chronicles mention that he murdered or expelled various other dukes, including his relatives.

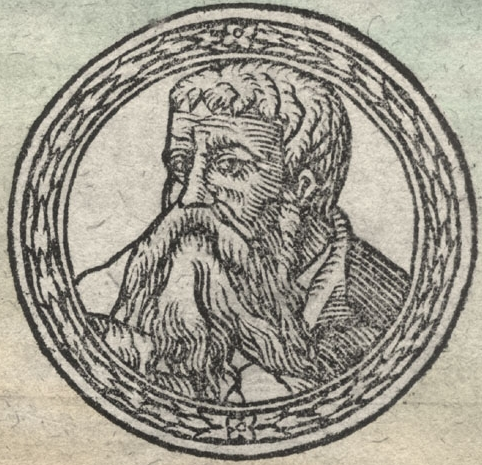
Vykintas, the victorious leader in the Battle of Saule, as depicted in the Chronicles of Alexander Guagnini, published in 1578

In 1236, Duke Vykintas led the Samogitian forces to victory in the Battle of Saule, where the Livonian Order suffered a catastrophic defeat. It seems that Vykintas did not receive support from Mindaugas. Vykintas' personal power grew. The Livonian Order was on the brink of collapse and was forced to become a branch of the Teutonic Knights. The combined Orders focused on the conquest of Samogitia, since only this land prevented them from consolidating their territories. The union of these aggressive powers could not have passed without notice in Lithuanian lands, and might have furthered the unification process. In about 1239 Mindaugas took over the weakened Black Ruthenia and appointed his son Vaišvilkas to govern it. During the early 1240s, Mindaugas strengthened and established his power in various Baltic lands. In 1245, Mindaugas sent his nephews Tautvilas and Edivydas, the sons of Dausprungas and Vykintas, to conquer Smolensk, but they were unsuccessful. In 1249, an internal war erupted as Mindaugas sought to seize his nephews' and Vykintas' lands.

Tautvilas, Edivydas, and Vykintas formed a powerful coalition with the Samogitians, the Livonian Order, Daniel of Galicia (Tautvilas and Edivydas' brother-in-law), and Vasilko of Volhynia in opposition to Mindaugas. Only Poles, invited by Daniel, declined to take part in the coalition against the Lithuanians. The dukes of Galicia and Volhynia managed to gain control over Black Ruthenia, an area ruled by Mindaugas' son Vaišvilkas. Tautvilas traveled to Riga, where he was baptized by the Archbishop. In 1250, the Order organized two major raids, one against Nalša land and the other against the domains of Mindaugas and those parts of Samogitia that still supported him.

Attacked from the north and south and facing the possibility of unrest elsewhere, Mindaugas was placed in an extremely difficult position, but managed to use the conflicts between the Livonian Order and the Archbishop of Riga in his own interests. He succeeded in bribing Andreas von Stierland, the master of the Order, who was still angry at Vykintas for the defeat in 1236. In 1251, Mindaugas agreed to receive baptism and relinquish control over some lands in western Lithuania, for which he was to receive a crown in return. In 1252, Tautvilas and his remaining allies attacked Mindaugas in Voruta, sometimes considered to be the first capital of Lithuania. The attack failed and Tautvilas' forces retreated to defend themselves in Tverai Castle, in the present-day Rietavas municipality. Vykintas died in or about 1253, and Tautvilas was forced to rejoin Daniel of Galicia. Daniel reconciled with Mindaugas in 1254; the Black Ruthenian lands were transferred to Roman, the son of Daniel. Vaišvilkas, the son of Mindaugas, decided to join a monastery. Tautvilas recognized Mindaugas' superiority and received Polotsk as a fiefdom.

== Kingdom of Lithuania ==
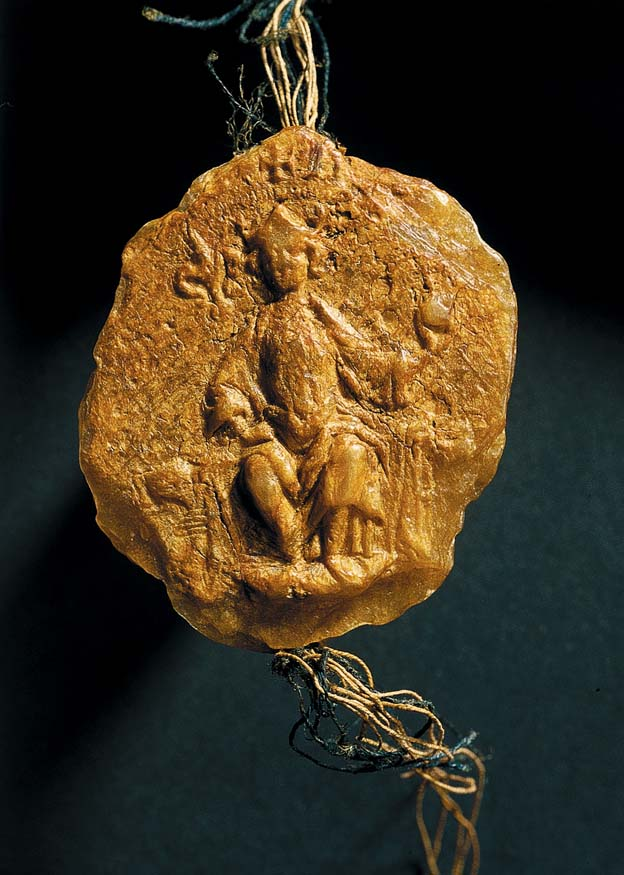
The only surviving Seal of Mindaugas from 1255

As promised, Mindaugas and his wife Morta were crowned at some time during the summer of 1253, and the Kingdom of Lithuania, proclaimed by the pope in 1251, was soundly established. 6 July is now celebrated as "Statehood Day" (Lithuanian: Valstybės diena); it is an official holiday in modern Lithuania. However, the exact date of the coronation is not known; the scholarship of historian Edvardas Gudavičius, who promulgated this date, is sometimes challenged. The location of the coronation remains unknown. (Note: See Novogrudok)

Pope Innocent IV supported Mindaugas, hoping that a new Christian state could stem the inroads being made by the Golden Horde, a state of the Mongol Empire. On 17 July 1251, the pope signed two crucial papal bulls. One of them ordered the Bishop of Chełmno to crown Mindaugas as King of Lithuania, appoint a bishop for Lithuania, and to build a cathedral. The other bull specified that the new bishop was to be directly subordinate to the pope. This was a welcome development to the Lithuanians, since they were concerned that their long-standing antagonists, the Livonian Order, would exert too much control over the new state.

It took some time before a Bishop of Lithuania was appointed because of various conflicts of interest. The Bishop of Gniezno appointed Vito (Lithuanian: Vitas), a monk of the Dominican Order, to this position, but he was not recognized by Mindaugas or accepted by the populace. The activities of Vito in Lithuania are unknown, although he is sometimes associated with Mindaugas' Cathedral. Finally, in 1254, Christian (Lithuanian: Kristijonas) from the Livonian Order was appointed. Mindaugas endowed him with some lands in Samogitia, but not much is known about his activities. Historical sources do not mention any sponsorship of missionaries, education of priests, or construction of churches during that time, and Bishop Christian went back to Germany in 1259, where he died in 1271. The establishment of Mindaugas' Cathedral remains problematic, but recent archeological research found the remains of a 13th-century brick building on the site of the present-day Vilnius Cathedral. The general assumption is that the remains are those of Mindaugas Cathedral, built to satisfy the agreement with the pope. However, as later events showed, Lithuanians resisted Christianization, and Mindaugas' baptism had only a temporary impact on further developments.

Immediately after his coronation, Mindaugas transferred some western lands to the Livonian Order – portions of Samogitia, Nadruva, and Dainava. There is some discussion as to whether in later years (1255, 1257, 1259, 1261) Mindaugas gave even more lands to the Order. The deeds might have been falsified by the Order; the case for this scenario is bolstered by the fact that some of the documents mention lands that were not actually under the control of Mindaugas. Whatever the case, relative peace and stability was established for about eight more years. Mindaugas used this opportunity to concentrate on expansion to the east. He strengthened his influence in Black Ruthenia, in Pinsk, and took advantage of the collapsed Kievan Rus' by conquering Polotsk, a major center of commerce in the Daugava River basin. He also negotiated a peace with Galicia–Volhynia, and married a daughter to Svarn, the son of Daniel of Galicia, who would later become Grand Duke of Lithuania. Diplomatic relations with western Europe and the Holy See were also reinforced. In 1255, Mindaugas received permission from Pope Alexander IV to crown his son as King of Lithuania. In the domestic arena, Mindaugas strove to establish state institutions: his own noble court, administrative systems, a diplomatic service, and a monetary system. Silver Lithuanian long currency (Lithuanian: Lietuvos ilgieji) circulated, providing an indice of statehood.

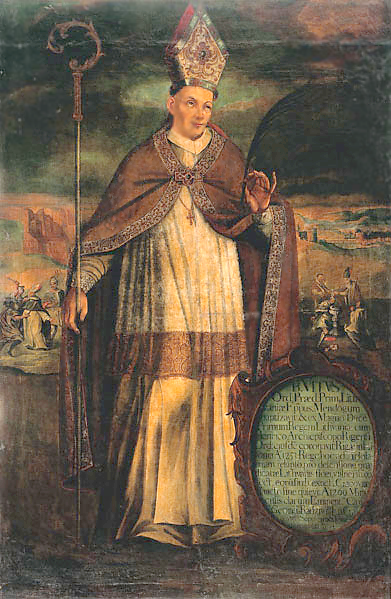
Vitas, the first bishop of Lithuania. Painting from the 17th century

The Livonian Order used this period to consolidate their control over Samogitian lands. They built three castles along the border: Memelburg (Klaipėda), Georgenburg (Jurbarkas), and Doben (Durbe in Latvia). The Samogitians responded by electing Algminas as their war leader, and attacked Courland, as the Order had limited battlefield successes. In 1259, the Livonian Order lost the Battle of Skuodas, and in 1260, it lost the Battle of Durbe. The first loss encouraged a rebellion by the Semigalians, and the later loss spurred the Prussians into an uprising against the Order. The Great Prussian Uprising lasted for 14 years. Encouraged by Treniota, his nephew, Mindaugas broke peace with the Order. Some chronicles hint that he also returned to his former pagan beliefs, but this is disputable. Nevertheless, all the diplomatic achievements made since his coronation were lost.

Mindaugas then formed an alliance with Alexander Nevsky of Novgorod and marched against the Order. Treniota led an army to Cēsis and battled Masovia, hoping to encourage all the conquered Baltic tribes to rise up against the Orders and unite under Lithuanian leadership. He waged successful battles, but did not manage to capture the fortified castles or spark a coalition of Baltic forces against the Order. His personal influence grew because Mindaugas was concentrating on the conquest of Rus' lands, dispatching a large army to Bryansk. Treniota and Mindaugas began to pursue different priorities. In the midst of these events, Mindaugas' wife Morta died, and Mindaugas expressed the wish to marry Daumantas' wife. Daumantas and Treniota responded to this insult by assassinating Mindaugas and two of his sons, Ruklys and Rupeikis, in 1263.

== Years after Mindaugas ==
=== Years of instability ===
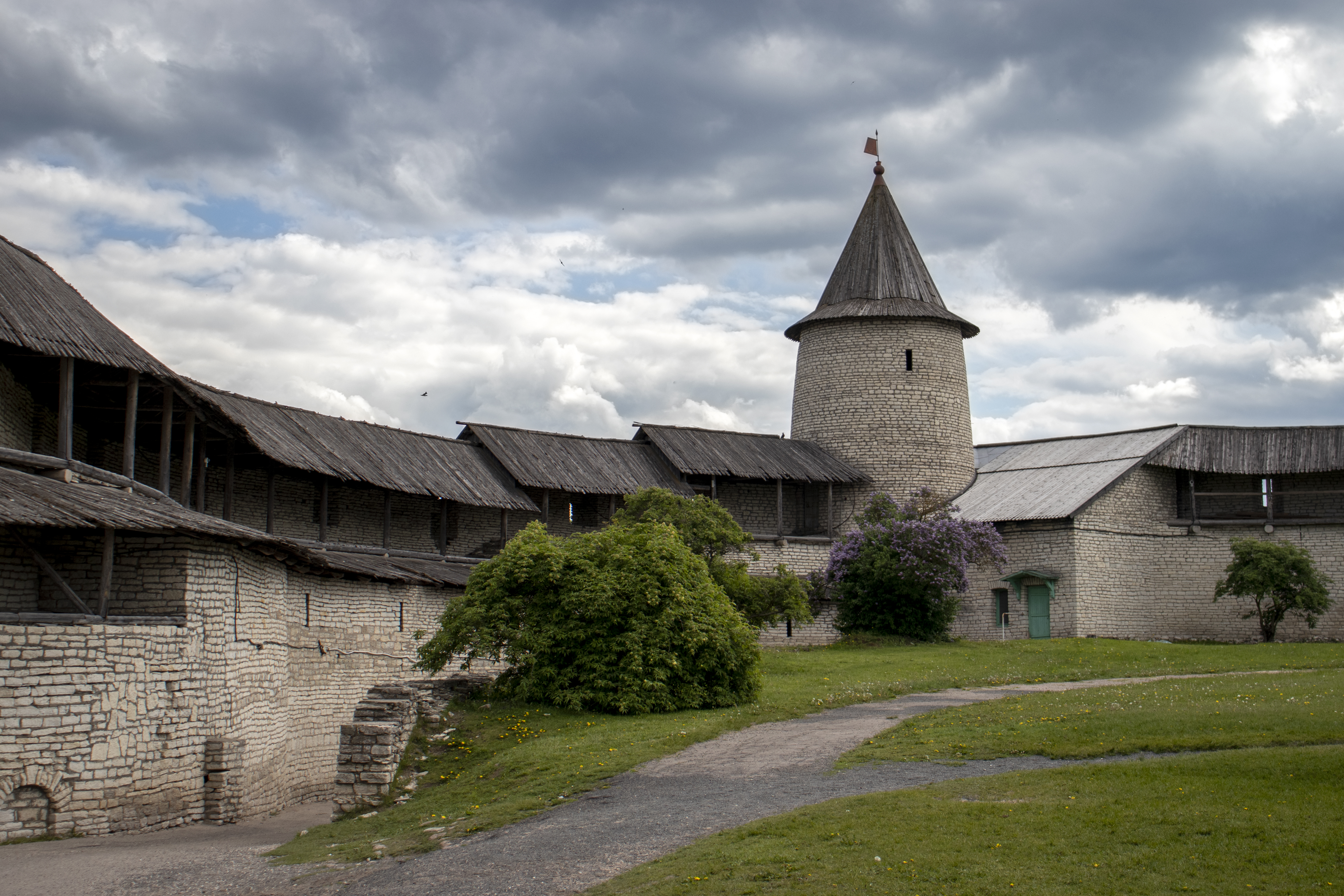
Walls of the Pskov kremlin built in part during the reign of Daumantas, one of the assassins of Mindaugas and patron saint of Pskov

After Mindaugas' death, the state did not disintegrate and Treniota took over the title of Grand Duke. However, his power was fragile; he was challenged by Tautvilas, who had not forgotten his own claims to power. Tautvilas was also assassinated by Treniota. However, just a year later, in 1264, Treniota was killed by Mindaugas' former servants. Mindaugas' son Vaišvilkas and brother-in-law Švarnas from Volhynia took over the control in Lithuania. Daumantas was forced to flee to Pskov, was baptized Timofei, ruled successfully from 1266 to 1299 and even became a saint. In 1265 Vaišvilkas, as a Christian, reconciled with the Livonian Order and, without support from Lithuania, the rebellions among the Balts that had been fueled by Treniota began to subside. In 1267 he returned to a monastic life and transferred the Grand Duchy to Švarnas.

Little is known about Švarnas and his rule, but historians believe he was unable to take control of all Lithuania, and ruled only over its southern portions. He died in 1269 or 1271 in Galicia.

=== Reign of Traidenis ===
The circumstances surrounding the advance to power in 1269 of the next ruler, Traidenis, are not clear. From the outset his relationships with Galicia–Volhynia were tense and eventually resulted in the 1274–1276 war. Traidenis was successful in battle, and his control over Black Ruthenia was strengthened. Traidenis, known for his strong anti-German attitude, was also successful in fighting with the Livonian Order. In 1270 he won the Battle of Karuse, fought on ice near Saaremaa. However, in 1272 the Order retaliated, attacking Semigalia and building Dünaburg (Daugavpils) Castle in 1273 on lands nominally controlled by Traidenis. Several years later, in 1281, Traidenis conquered Jersika Castle in the present-day Preiļi district, and was able to exchange it for the Dünaburg Castle. Dünaburg remained a Lithuanian outpost until 1313. In 1279 the Order attacked Lithuanian lands, reaching as far as Kernavė, but on their way back they suffered a major defeat in the Battle of Aizkraukle. The Order's master, Ernst von Rassburg, died in the battle, and the conquered Semigallians rebelled. The Semigallians were now willing to acknowledge Lithuania's superiority and asked Traidenis for assistance.

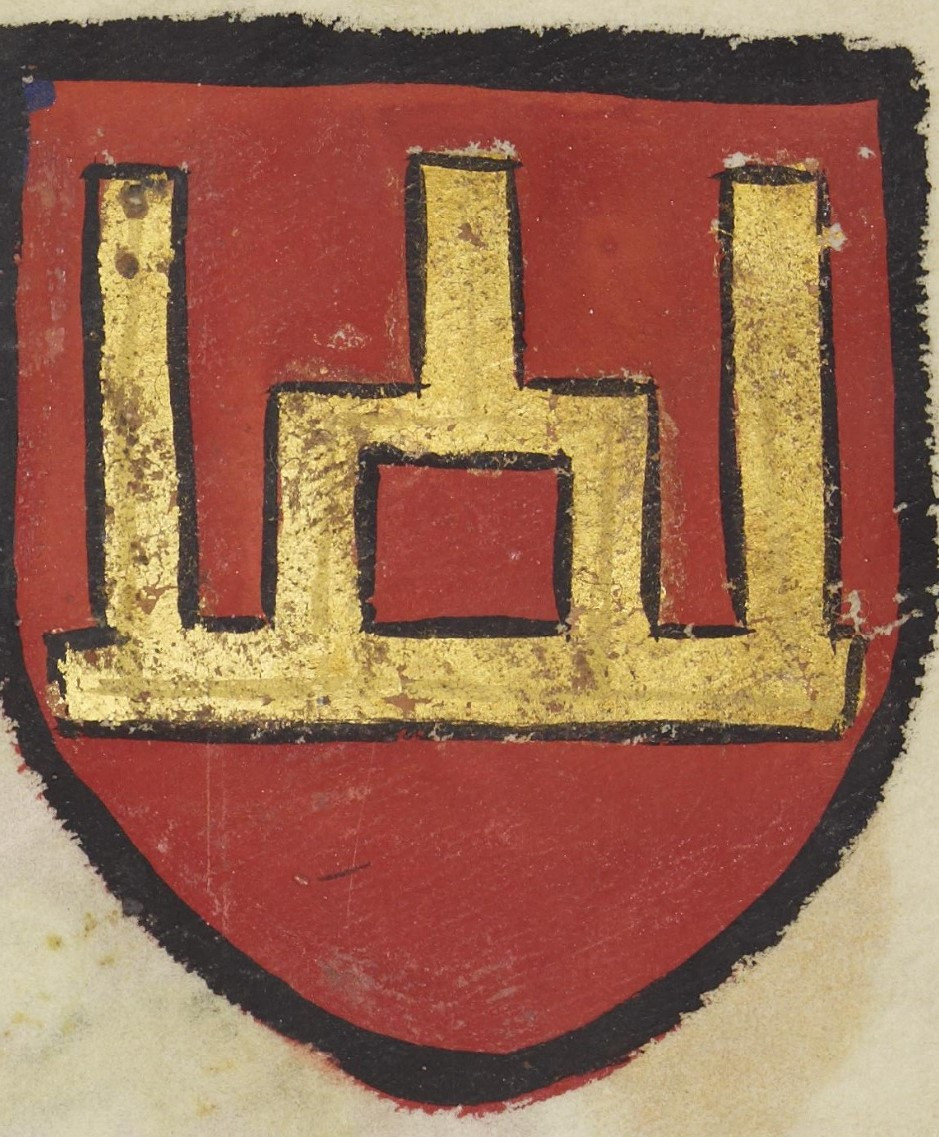
Columns of Gediminids, the symbol of a dynasty that started with Butigeidis ca. 1285 and ended with Sigismund II Augustus in 1572

Traidenis' reign was the longest and most stable regime during the period of unrest. After his death the Orders finalized their conquests: the conquered Baltic tribes did not rebel again and the Orders could now concentrate on Lithuania. In 1274 the Great Prussian Rebellion ended, and the Teutonic Knights proceeded to conquer other Baltic tribes: the Nadruvians and Skalvians in 1274–1277, and the Yotvingians in 1283; the Livonian Order completed its conquest of Semigalia, the last Baltic ally of Lithuania, in 1291.

=== Rise of Gediminids ===
There is considerable uncertainty about the identities of the Grand Dukes of Lithuania between Traidenis' death in 1282 and Vytenis' assumption of power in 1295. This is in part because the two main sources for Lithuanian history in the 13th century, the Hypatian Codex and the Livonian Rhymed Chronicle, end in the early 1290s. In 1285, one chronicle mentions Daumantas as Grand Duke. He attacked the Bishop of Tver and was severely wounded or even killed in the battle.

The Gediminid dynasty began its ascent in Lithuania during this time with the emergence of its first leader, Butigeidis. In 1289, leading about 8,000 troops, he attacked Sambia. In 1289 the Teutonic Knights built a castle in present-day Sovetsk (Tilsit) and their raids intensified. Butigeidis was the first to build strong castles along the Neman River. He died in 1290 or 1292, and his brother Butvydas (also known as Pukuveras) inherited the crown. Butvydas was the father of Vytenis and probably of Gediminas. During his short reign Butvydas tried to defend the duchy against the Teutonic Knights; he also attacked Masovia, an ally of the knights.

== Legacy ==
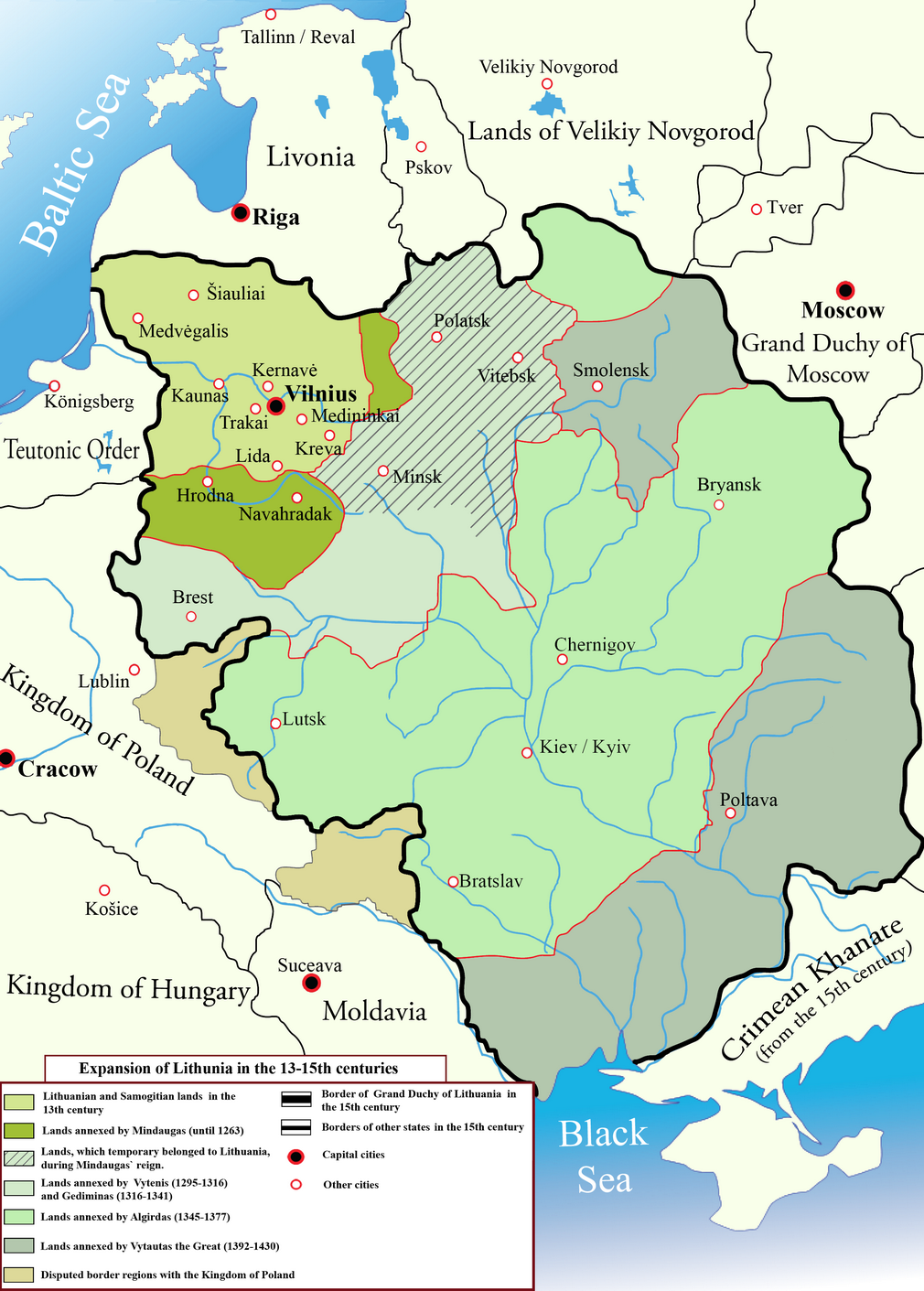
Map of the Grand Duchy of Lithuania during the 13–15th centuries

The state united and ruled by Mindaugas constituted the first Lithuanian state. The state effectively protected Lithuanians and Samogitians from assimilation induced by the Teutonic Knights and the Livonian Order, the destiny of Prussians, Skalvians, Curonians, Selonians and other Baltic tribes. Mindaugas ruled about 100,000 km^{2} (39,000 sq mi) of Lithuanian ethnic territory, an area with an estimated population of 300,000. By about 1430, at its peak during the reign of Vytautas the Great, the Grand Duchy controlled some 930,000 km^{2} (360,000 sq mi) and almost 2.5 million people.

The period from 1219 to 1295 also shaped future conflicts: the pagan Lithuanians were surrounded by the aggressive Roman Catholic Orders to its north and southwest, and by adherents of the Orthodox Church in the east. The Catholic Orders' raids intensified after they overcame the "buffer zone" created by Prussians, Nadruvians, Skalvians, Yotvingians, and Semigalians by 1283. The Lithuanian relationships with the Orthodox Church were more peaceful. The people were allowed to practise their religion; Lithuanian dukes did not hesitate to marry daughters of Orthodox dukes; at least some of the dukes' scribes must have been Orthodox as well. Struggles with the Teutonic Knights and expansion to the east were characteristic of the years from 1295 to 1377. It was inevitable that Lithuania could not endure religious, political, and cultural isolation forever and would have to choose either Roman Catholicism or Eastern Orthodoxy. In 1386, Grand Duke Jogaila elected baptism in the Catholic rite to marry Jadwiga of Poland and become King of Poland; the last pagan state in Europe was converted to Christianity.
