= Ruškaičiai =

The Ruškaičiai were a Lithuanian noble family of the 13th century, during the time of the Lithuanian land confederation as well as the rise and rule of king Mindaugas. The family came from the Upytė region of Lithuania (around the modern-day Nevėžis river). They were first mentioned in the 1219 Lithuania-Volhynia Peace Treaty of the Hypatian Codex, in the third place chronologically, showing that the Ruškaičiai played a fairly important role within the hierarchy. The dukes named in the peace treaty were Kintibutas, Vembutas, Butautas, Vyžeitis and his son Velžys, Kitenis, and Plikienė, the latter being the first woman mentioned in Lithuanian history as well as the wife of a deceased duke named Plikis. The Ruškaičiai family supported Mindaugas during the 1248-1282 civil war; Vaišna Ruškaitis and Sirvydas Ruškaitis were loyal war leaders during Lithuania's war with Daniel of Galicia over Black Ruthenia. Vembutas Ruškaitis was probably Mindaugas's vicegerent in Samogitia.

== See also ==
- History of Lithuania
