= Dausprungas =

Dausprungas (also Dovsprunk in Ruthenian sources, died before 1238) was the older brother of Mindaugas, the first King of Lithuania. Dausprungas is mentioned in the peace treaty with Galicia–Volhynia in 1219 among the 21 early dukes of Lithuania as one of the five elder dukes, the other four being Živinbudas, Daujotas, Mindaugas and Viligaila (Daujotas' brother). Since Dausprungas is the only known brother of Mindaugas, Mindaugas' nephews Edivydas and Tautvilas are presumed to be his sons. If that is true, then Dausprungas is father-in-law of Daniel of Galicia and he was also married to Vykintas' sister. Because it is known that Mindaugas used to kill his relatives to gain power and because Dausprungas is not mentioned in any other sources, some imply that he was killed by Mindaugas, but others rebut since his sons still ruled their lands in 1248.

== See also ==
- House of Mindaugas – family tree of Dausprungas
- Palemonids – legendary version of Dausprungas' life

== Sources ==
- Ivinskis, Zenonas (1937). "Dasprungas". In Vaclovas Biržiška (ed.). Lietuviškoji enciklopedija (in Lithuanian). Vol. VI. Kaunas: Spaudos Fondas. pp. 186–188.
