= Lists of battles of the Mongol invasion of Europe =

These are lists of battles of the Mongol invasion of Europe.

== Lists of battles ==
=== Mongol invasions of Eastern Europe ===
==== Mongol invasion of Volga Bulgaria (1223–1236) ====
- 1223: First Mongol invasion of Volga Bulgaria. Battle of Samara Bend ends with Mongol defeat.
- 1229–1230: Second Mongol invasion of Volga Bulgaria.
- 1236: Third Mongol invasion of Volga Bulgaria; Volga Bulgaria and parts of Cumania were conquered.

==== Mongol invasions of the North Caucasus ====
- 1237–1242 Mongol invasion of Cumania
- 1237–1253: Mongol invasion of Circassia
- 13th century: Mongol invasions of Durdzuketia (modern Chechnya and Ingushetia)

=== Mongol invasions of Central Europe (1240–1288) ===
- 1237–1240: Mongol invasions of Lithuania (first).
- late 1240–1241: First Mongol invasion of Poland (including Bohemia).
- March 1241 – April 1242: First Mongol invasion of Hungary
- 1241: Battle of Legnica and Battle of Mohi. Devastation of parts of Poland and Hungary following Mongol victories. Some Mongol troops reaches the outskirts of Vienna and Udine. Death of Ögedei Khan; Retreat of Mongol-Tatar army.
- spring 1241 – early 1242: Mongol incursions in the Holy Roman Empire (including Austria and northeast Italy)
- 1241–1242: Mongol invasion of Croatia and Dalmatia
- 1258–1259: Mongol invasions of Lithuania (second).
- 1258–1260: Second Mongol invasion of Poland (including Halych-Volhynia and Lithuania).
- 1275, 1279, 1325: Mongol invasions of Lithuania (reprises).
- 1284–1285: Second Mongol invasion of Hungary.
- 1287–1288: Third Mongol invasion of Poland.
- 1337, 1340: Ruthenian-Tatar raids against Poland
- 1363: Battle of Blue Waters. A Lithuanian army defeats the Mongol Army

=== Mongol invasions of Southeastern Europe ===
- 1241–1242: Mongol invasion of Moldavia and Wallachia
- 1241–1242: Mongol invasion of Bulgaria and Serbia
- 1242–1243: Mongol invasion of the Latin Empire
- 1264/1265: Mongol invasion of Byzantine Thrace
- 1271, 1274, 1282 and 1285: Raids against Bulgaria.
- 1291: Serbian conflict with the Nogai Horde.
- 1324 and 1337: Tatar incursions against Byzantine Thrace.

== See also ==
- Genghis Khan
- Destruction under the Mongol Empire
- Timeline of the Golden Horde
- Crimean–Nogai slave raids in Eastern Europe
