= Lithuanians (tribe) =

Medieval East Baltic tribe

- Ancient Lithuanian lands alongside other Baltic territories in the 11th–early 13th centuries

Regions with significant populations
- Eastern Lithuania

Languages
- Old Lithuanian

Religion
- Lithuanian paganism

Related ethnic groups
- Latgalians, Yotvingians, Selonians

The Lithuanians or Old Lithuanians (Latin: Letwini;^{:33} Low German: Lettowen; Old East Slavic: Литъва, Литва; (Note: In Old East Slavic writings, certain ethnonyms, such as Литва (Литъва), were applied for both the location and its people (cf. Голядь 'Galindia', 'Galindians'; Чудь (Чюдь) 'Estonia', 'Estonians').) Old Swedish: lättugha; modern Lithuanian: senlietuviai) were a medieval East Baltic tribe mainly inhabiting present-day Eastern Lithuania in the 5th–13th centuries.^{:182} Following the Northern Crusades, the ancient Lithuanians began gradually assimilating other neighbouring Baltic tribes, becoming the primary progenitor group of modern Lithuanians.

== History ==
=== Origin and trade ===
It is believed that ancient Lithuania initially covered around 80,000 km^{2} and was home to around 300,000 inhabitants, most of them living as farmers. Traditionally historians divide the area into six attested lands – Nalšia, Deltuva, Upytė, Lietuva, Neris and Deremela, (Note: The Tale of Igor's Campaign stands as the sole historical record mentioning Deremela, prompting modern scholars to question its existence.) with Lietuva (Lethowia)^{:33} passing on its name to the entire country. A seventh land lay between the Neris, Merkinė, and Neman rivers, but no records of its name remain. At its greatest extent, early Lithuania stretched from the Neman–Šventoji rivers in the west to the Narach–Svir lakes in the east.^{:182}

Because of the three archaeological cultures in Lithuania, some scholars divide the Lithuanian ethnos into three cultural groups – Samogitians (Western), Aukštaitians (Note: In academic literature, they are referred to as Aukštaitians (a neologism derived from Aukštaičiai) or upland Lithuanians. The translation highland Lithuanians is not applicable.) (Central) and Lithuanians (Eastern). Traditionally, the Samogitian tribe is included within the broader Lithuanian ethnos as suggested by historical accounts, dividing Lithuania into two parts – Austechia (Aukštaitija) and Samogitia (Žemaitija)^{:1} – but their origins are a subject of ongoing debate. Linguist Jūratė Sofija Laučiūtė argues that prior to their assimilation, ancient Samogitians were a different tribe from the Lithuanians, which is evinced by certain linguistic features not explainable by phonetics alone, such as the ending -ou <*-ou of masculine nouns in the genitive form (e.g. Samogitian velkou, Lithuanian vilkui, meaning (dat) 'wolf'). Valdemaras Šimėnas suggests that, culturally and linguistically, ancient Samogitians were closer to Curonians, Semigallians and Selonians than to the Lithuanians. The Samogitians formed a tribal union with the Lithuanians, which was an ongoing process starting in c. 1180s and culminating by the early 13th century. Its centre was in present-day south-eastern Lithuania. Samogitia also maintained its own distinct land confederation, capable of withstanding external military aggression as shown during the Battle of Saulė in 1236, yet over time it became increasingly dependent on Lithuania, as demonstrated by the Lithuanian campaign through its territory into Courland (c. 1244–45) or the Samogitian–Order alliance against the Lithuanians (1248), formed to resist their attempts at asserting control over northern Samogitia, by then the last part of the region not under their direct rule.

Lithuania proper consisted of two archaeological cultural areas – Central and Eastern – with the former never becoming a continuous ethnopolitical unit.^{:30} Though contested, based on the spread of cremation and West Baltic acculturation, it is believed that the Aukštaitians were a consequence of westward Lithuanian migration into a Samogitian heterogeneous cultural zone, driven by Slavic expansion.^{:153} Central Lithuanian culture existed in the 6th–12th centuries, reaching its prosperity in the 9th–11th centuries. Burial practices and ceramics indicate that Central Lithuania was affected by the West Baltic cultures and belonged to the zone of maritime influence. Archaeological research shows that Vikings navigated the Neman River and traded with local populations, while Kaunas emerged as a major economic and political trading centre. Such incursions into the Lithuanian heartlands may have also brought the practice of cremation burials to the region.^{:152} The Lithuanians were familiar with surrounding waterways around the Baltic Sea and the Curonian Lagoon, initially possessing fluvial watercraft.^{:12} By the early 13th century, Lithuanian ships ventured into the Baltic Sea and reached the shores of Gotland where they would trade goods such as amber, honey, beeswax, flax, hemp or ash – this lasted until 1229 when Pope Gregory IX restricted the rights of traders and banned the practice of selling goods to the heathens.^{:28} In the 12th–13th centuries, Eastern Lithuania witnessed notable social and economic development, fostering advancements in trade, artisanship and political stability. In contrast, the western Baltic regions declined, as shown by the substantially greater number of archaeological monetary finds in Eastern Lithuania.

In the 4th–8th centuries, after the loss of Roman commerce and coins, Lithuania and other Baltic lands had no known currency and are believed to have traded in kind. As of the 8th century, silver dirhams were gradually introduced to the region by either neighbouring or Arabic merchants, possibly reaching Eastern Lithuania through the Daugava River and southern Rus'.^{:59} From the 10th century onward, forged and smelted silver alloys of Scandinavian origin were brought to Lithuania and used as currency or jewellery.^{:4} In the mid-12th century, once their production abroad had fallen out of favour, ancient Lithuanians began producing their own currency – long silver ingots with cut marks – commonly known as kapas or ilgasis.^{:105}

=== Society and culture ===
Archaeologist Laurynas Kurila believes that by the 5th century, the Lithuanians began adopting a war-based societal model found in military democracies. The tribal society was governed following the customary law and was based on a hierarchical structure consisting of four divisions – a duke, soldiers, free peasants (laukininkai) and slaves (šeimynykščiai). By the 9th century, a chieftain gradually became known as kunigas. Commencing in the 12th century, each ruler began to govern a particular land through hereditary succession and adopted the title kunigaikštis.

In ancient Lithuanian culture, religious suicide was practised and likely common. The Lithuanians were known to engage in acts of honour suicide by sacrificing themselves to their gods or after defeat in battle. In addition, Lithuanian women would take their own lives following the loss of their husbands. The latter custom was attested by Henry of Latvia, who recorded that 50 Lithuanian wives of defeated warriors chose to hang themselves to reunite with them in the afterlife.^{:51–52} In a letter from Pope Honorius III written in 1218, it is said that the Lithuanians practised human sacrifice of war captives to their gods.

The deceased tribespeople were buried in the ground, and by the 7th–8th centuries, cremation became widespread throughout the area.^{:148} They were positioned with men's heads facing West and women's heads facing East.^{:115} The Lithuanians dedicated separate burial mounds to the riding horses, sometimes half of an entire kurgan.^{:15} The Lithuanians had the custom of purposely breaking weapons as well as jewellery when burning the deceased – this was probably done to send these items to the afterlife. They also produced small axes only used during funeral rites.

=== Weaponry ===
Lithuanian soldiers used stabbing spears with socketed spearheads, throwing spears with hafted spearheads, and shields as early as the 5th century. Both types of spears were in use until the 9th century, while the most recent shields date to the 8th century.^{:39–40} From the late 5th century, the Lithuanians also possessed ornamented battle axes and, by the 10th century, began crafting light, usually adorned, broad-bladed battle axes. The findings in Varliškis and Čiobiškis burial mounds suggest that axes with narrow blades and blunt ends were also used as weapons until the 10th–11th century.^{:14} Both one-edged and two-edged swords are rarely found, as they were probably expensive to produce, and only wealthy chieftains could obtain them.^{:40} Around the 11th–12th century, the first chainmail armour started to appear.^{:38}

=== Warfare ===
==== 11th century ====
The Lithuanians were known as fierce warriors who constantly raided neighbouring lands, predominantly in Northeastern Europe, seeking to capture people, cattle and horses. The Kievan Rus' chronicles attest that Yaroslav the Wise led a campaign against the Lithuanians in the 1040s, after which they allegedly paid tribute. Nonetheless, the exact date, outcome, and long-term implications of said attack remain unclear, as the Russian Primary Chronicle and the Novgorod First Chronicle offer conflicting dates (1040 and 1044, respectively), whereas a Kievan victory is only explicitly mentioned in Khlebnikov’s version of events. Birchbark manuscript 590 mentions a Lithuanian military campaign against Karelia in c. 1060–80. A semi-legendary account from the Bychowiec Chronicle claims they and the Samogitians carried out a joint punitive raid against Vseslav of Polotsk, sacking Braslaw and taking many captives in 1065. In the 11th century, the Lithuanians were recorded crossing the Orsha River and devastating surrounding locations.

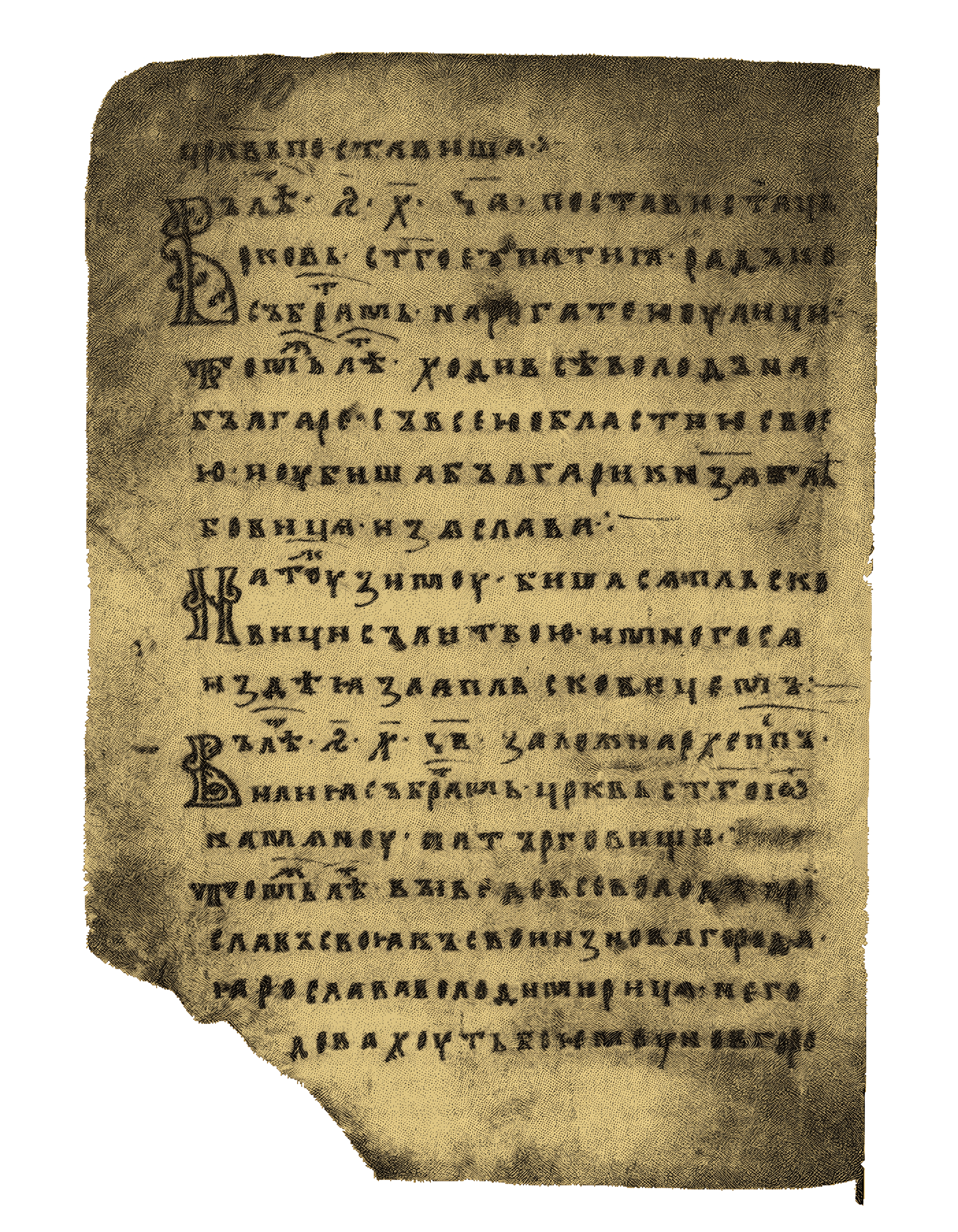
A page from the Novgorod First Chronicle describing the Lithuanian campaign of 1183.

==== 12th century ====
In c. 1131–32, Mstislav I of Kiev launched a campaign against Lithuania, but when the Kievans were heading back, the Lithuanians retaliated by annihilating one of their detachments.^{:153} By 1158, Lithuania was acting as a sovereign early feudal proto-state. From 1159 to 1162, the Lithuanians leveraged political infighting in neighbouring Polotsk by aiding Prince Volodar Glebovich in his bid to depose Prince Rogvolod Vasily. They joined Polotsk as allies in 1180 to lay siege to Drutsk, yet from this decade onwards, their independent military campaigns surged in prominence. In 1183, the Novgorod First Chronicle mentions a Lithuanian attack on Pskov, marking the start of numerous raids against it. A record from The Tale of Igor’s Campaign compares the devastating impact of the Lithuanian incursions to that of the Cumans. Further incursions in 1185–86 led to the Lithuanians taking many Livonian captives, prompting the Livs to seek protection from Bishop Meinhard.^{:166} In 1187, their forces targeted the vicinity of Polotsk, resulting in the death of Iziaslav. In 1188, the Lithuanians made an alliance with the Swedes, who already had a kingdom, against Novgorod. Their plundering continued as they raided Karelia in 1191 as well as the countryside of Velikiye Luki in 1198. Russa, a Novgorodian town south of Lake Ilmen, was likely fortified the following year in response to these raids.

==== 13th century ====
In 1200, the Lithuanians devastated the lands near Lovat, doing "whatever they pleased". In 1201–02, they started a war raid against Semigallia, yet their plans were disrupted by an attack of the Principality of Polotsk on Lithuania itself. In 1203, they allied with the Principality of Jersika and stormed Riga, taking the livestock of its residents.^{:65} In 1205, 2,000 Lithuanians led by Duke Žvelgaitis^{:32} marched into Estonia and returned with "countless captives [possibly more than 1,000 Estonians] and an ineffable number of cattle and horses." However, their victorious return with booty and prisoners of war was marred by an ambush of the allied Semigallian and German forces.^{:51}^{:33} On Christmas Day 1207, they stormed Treiden (Turaida), Livonia, and looted the countryside, including the house of a priest.^{:33} The raiders also took prisoners, most of whom were women and children. In 1208, Semigallians and Germans invaded Lithuania, only to find its villages abandoned. On their way back home, Lithuanian raiders attacked them, defeated them, and took many captives.^{:33–34} In 1209, Henry of Latvia described the Lithuanians as ruthless people whose neighbours lived in constant fear and endured their relentless raids:

At that time, the Lithuanians so dominated over all the tribes living in these [neighbouring] lands, be they Christians or heathens, that few dared to live in their villages, especially the Latgalians who dared the least. Leaving their homes deserted, they always sought hideouts in the dark woods, but even so, they could not escape them because [the Lithuanians], constantly lurking in the forests, would capture and kill them, take others as captives, bring them to their land, and strip them of all their belongings. And Ruthenians fled through the woods and villages from the Lithuanians, even if they were few, as hares flee from a hunter, and the Livs and the Latgalians became food and fodder for the Lithuanians as sheep without a shepherd, trapped among a pack of wolves.^{:174}

The frequency of certain raids in the 1210s is likely related to the connections shared by the Lithuanians and Estonians, who at times might have collaborated with one another – during a Novgorodian invasion of an Estonian vicinity, the Lithuanians invaded Novgorod. In the summer of 1210, they formed an alliance with the Curonians, Estonians, Livs, Polotskians and Semigallians against the Germans. However, only the Lithuanians and Curonians took military action: the former besieged Kukenois (Koknese), and the latter attacked Riga. In 1212, ancient Lithuanians returned to Estonia again and pillaged Sakala.^{:32} The following year, they raided Lennewarden (Lielvārde)^{:183} and burnt down Pskov. In 1219, Ösel (Saaremaa) faced a brutal onslaught by 1,500 Lithuanian raiders who landed in Sõrve, ravaged the island and killed its locals:

Deluded by their bravery / They went through all the land [...] / All paths, and also tracks / Were covered rich in blood [...] / They taught folk how to die / Both men and women / If only they have failed to flee.

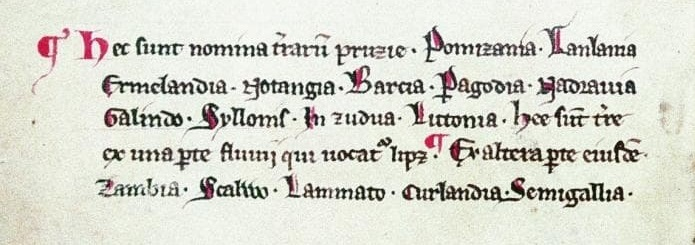
Baltic tribes listed in the Danish Census Book (Liber Census Daniae)

Frequent campaigns against Novgorod by the Lithuanians in 1217, 1218, 1223, 1224, 1226, 1230, and 1234 severely weakened the Novgorodians as they struggled to mount effective defences or swift counter-attacks.^{:11} The increased focus on the Rus’ principalities was also facilitated by making a truce with Riga in 1226, after which 7,000 Lithuanian soldiers sacked Torzhok and Toropets.^{:15} From the 1230s, following the conquest of other neighbouring tribes, the Christian military orders in both the north and southwest began posing an existential threat to the Lithuanians. As of 1231, the Danish Census Book mentions Lithuania (Littonia) and many other Baltic lands paying tribute to the Danes, who ultimately failed to subjugate them. As recounted by Franciscan scholar Bartholomaeus Anglicus in his c. 1240 work On the Properties of Things (De proprietatibus rerum), efforts to subdue the Lithuanians were oftentimes forestalled by their bellicose nature and impassable seasonal mires:

Lithuania of Scythia is a province whose people are called the Lithuanians, a robust and strong, warlike and fierce folk. Furthermore, Lithuania is a region whose soil is fertile, marshy in many places, and greatly wooded, well-watered by rivers and streams, abounding with wild beasts and livestock. It is fortified by groves and wetlands, having few other defences besides rivers, woods, and fens. And so in summer that region can scarcely be captured, save only in winter, when waters and rivers turn to ice.

In late 1244, the Curonians, Samogitians and Lithuanians stormed Amboten Castle (Embūte), which the Livonian Order had taken over the previous year. In c. 1245–47, seeking to avenge his brother, Duke Lengvenis led his men against the Livonian knights in Wenden Castle (Cēsis), defeating them and taking the severed head of Commander Heinrich von Sessendorp as a trophy – the latter was made to be carried by a captive back to Lithuania, where it was then offered to the gods.^{:126–127} The Novgorod Fourth Chronicle mentions that the Lithuanians killed Mikhail Khorobrit during the Battle of Protva in 1248.

In July 1251, after Mindaugas secured a crown from the pope, Lithuania was granted the status of a Catholic kingdom and became the Kingdom of Lithuania. Nonetheless, the period of peace between Lithuania and the Crusader states was short-lived. In 1258–59, despite withstanding a devastating Mongolian incursion, Lithuania was in political turmoil, with its pro-pagan noblemen pushing for a renouncement of their alliance with the Livonian Order and securing favourable relations with the Tatars instead.

In 1260, crusaders from Livonia and Prussia joined forces and launched a large campaign towards Karšuva, Samogitia, but upon learning about a Samogitian–Lithuanian incursion into their lands, they turned north and met them near Libau (Liepāja), resulting in the Battle of Durbė. The Livonian Rhymed Chronicle describes a devastating defeat of the crusaders, amongst them Landmeister Burkhard von Hornhausen and Marshal Heinrich Botel, whereas Erik’s Chronicle recounts how Junker Karl Ulfsson refused to retreat and met his cruel fate at the hands of the Lithuanians.

In 1263, the Lithuanians sacked Pernau (Pärnu) and burned down its newly built Osilian-Maritimian cathedral city, Perona. Unhindered, they marched farther north and attacked Wiek (Läänemaa) after the Livonian knights protecting the land had been sent to Courland. In 1270, the Battle of Karuse on frozen ice near the island of Mohn (Muhu) ensued: after returning from a raid, the Lithuanians were unexpectedly attacked by the Livonian Brothers. However, they emerged victorious against the knights, killing Master Otto von Lutterberg. According to Peter of Dusburg, the Knight Commander of Ragnit Ludwig von Liebenzell sailed to Aukštaitija and "took part in many laudable battles in many campaigns at sea" against the Lithuanians from 1294 to 1300. In 1295, Teutonic Knights sailed the Neman River, pillaging a nearby Lithuanian village and taking captives on the way, but were then attacked by Lithuanian boats. Although the Lithuanians lost 70 warriors, the Crusaders were ultimately defeated, with about 30 casualties, including Friar Dietrich von Esbek. In the same year, the Lithuanians sailed to the Neman island near Ragnit (Neman), preying on horses and cattle. In 1296–97, they stormed German-colonised Culm (Chełmno) and sacked five villages near Golub Castle, capturing or slaughtering many Christians.^{:195}

Throughout the Northern Crusades, most Baltic tribes suffered tremendous casualties in conflicts and revolts against their conquerors. The Lithuanians, who succeeded in establishing a state, gradually assimilated those residing in its territories. The migration of Baltic peoples who resisted German colonisation and sought refuge in Lithuania also contributed to the ongoing ethnogenesis. Historical records attest that after the destruction of Sidabrė Castle in 1290, 10,000 Semigallians fled to Lithuania. Old Prussians met a similar fate, with many seeking sanctuary in southern Lithuania after the unsuccessful Prussian uprisings. Following the demise of Curonian and Prussian tribal societies, which had acted as the primary Baltic cultural centres for 3,000 years, Lithuania emerged as their successor.
