= Daugirutis =

Lithuanian duke (died 1213)

Daugirutis or Dangerutis (Dangeruthe or Daugeruthe) was an early Lithuanian duke who committed suicide in 1213. He is the second (after Žvelgaitis) Lithuanian duke whose name is known from reliable sources. His life is recorded in the Chronicle of Henry of Livonia; even though no other sources mention his name, he is considered to be one of the most influential pre-Mindaugas Lithuanian nobles.

Daugirutis attacked Latvian and Estonian lands many times. His domain or lands he ruled are unknown. His daughter was married to Visvaldis, Duke of Jersika (in the present-day Līvāni municipality). This marriage protected Visvaldis from attacks of Lithuanians, but he had to provide food and shelter for the troops of Daugirutis on their expeditions to plunder the Estonian or Russian lands.

In 1213, Daugirutis traveled to Veliky Novgorod to sign a peace treaty with Mstislav. The chronicles of Novgorod do not mention the treaty. While the purpose of the agreement is not explicitly mentioned, historians assume it was directed against the Livonian Order. On his way back Daugirutis was attacked and captured by the Livonian Order. He was imprisoned in the Cēsis Castle and a large ransom was requested for his release. When his friends arrived to discuss the terms of release, but did not bring enough money for the ransom, Daugirutis killed himself.

That Daugirutis was a powerful man is evidenced by his agreement with Novgorod. If Daugirutis was weak or ruled only small territories there would be no point for Novgorod in negotiating with a petty noble. The Lithuanian raids to Livonia and other lands decreased greatly in number after the deaths of Daugirutis and Steksys. This is considered a period of decline in the unification of the Baltic tribes into the Grand Duchy of Lithuania.

== See also ==
- List of early Lithuanian dukes
- Žvelgaitis
- Steksys
