= Visvaldis =

Prince of Jersika (d. after 1230)

- Prince of Jersika
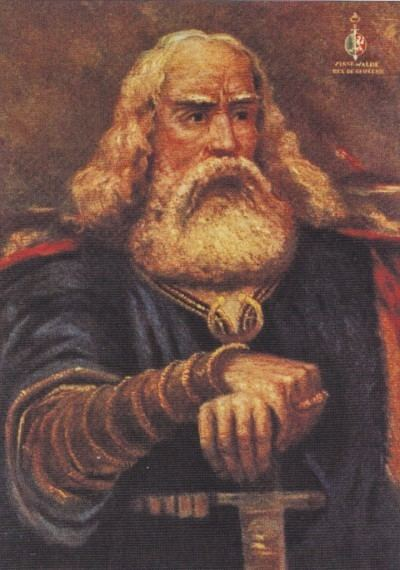
- Painting by Ludolfs Liberts, Riga Castle (1936)
- Reign: after 1230
- Successor: None
- Died: c. 1230–1239; Jersika
- Dynasty: Rurik
- Father: Boris Davidovich (?)
- Religion: Eastern Orthodoxy
- Occupation: Aristocrat

Visvaldis (Note: Latin: Vissewalde rex de Gerzika; Russian: Всеволод; Belarusian: Усевалад) was a Latgalian nobleman and the prince of Jersika in the 13th century. In the Livonian Chronicle of Henry, he is called king (rex).

== Biography ==
Visvaldis's date of birth is unknown. His origins, too, are unclear: some scholars think that he was a son of Barys Davidavič, prince of Polotsk, and a Latgalian mother.

The first written record of him dates from 1203 and tells of how he, together with the Lithuanians attacked the newly established city of Riga. Although he was a vassal of Principality of Polotsk, he was married to a daughter of the Lithuanian duke Daugerutis and thus became also Lithuania's ally. Between 1203 and 1208, Visvaldis, together with the Lithuanians repeatedly raided Livonian lands and tried to gain full control of the River Daugava.

In 1209, Bishop Albert of Riga led German crusaders and the allied Livonian army against the Principality of Jersika. They did not meet significant resistance and plundered Visvaldis's capital, the Jersika hillfort, taking his wife prisoner. Visvaldis, however, managed to escape but he was forced to surrender and became a vassal of Albert of Riga. He was forced to submit his kingdom to Albert as a gift to the Bishopric of Riga, and received only a portion of it as a fiefdom. Visvaldis's feudal charter is the oldest such document surviving in Latvia, and calls him "the king of Jersika" ("Vissewalde, rex de Gercike").

In 1214, Jersika castle was again destroyed by the German knight Meinhard from Koknese because Visvaldis was still supporting the Lithuanians.

In later years, Visvaldis's lands were repeatedly divided among Bishop Albert of Riga and the Livonian Brothers of the Sword.

Visvaldis's date of death is unknown, and is probably between 1230 and 1239. The Chronicle of Henry of Livonia describes Jersika hillfort as abandoned in 1239.
