= Christian (bishop of Lithuania) =

- Bishop of Lithuania
- Church: Roman Catholic Church
- Diocese: Diocese of Lithuania

Orders
- Consecration: 1253 by Albert Suerbeer

Personal details
- Died: c. 1270

Christian (died c. 1270) was a priest and a member of the Livonian branch of the Teutonic Order, active in Lithuania during the reign of Mindaugas, who also served briefly as Bishop of Lithuania.

== Biography ==
=== Consecration ===
Details of Christian’s early life are unknown. He first appears in 1253 at the court of Mindaugas, the Lithuanian king newly crowned by Heidenreich, Bishop of Chełmno, and was present there earlier, certainly during king's baptism.

Earlier, on 17 July 1251, Heidenreich received instructions from Pope Innocent IV to crown Mindaugas and to appoint for him a bishop directly subordinate to the Apostolic See. Heidenreich set out for Lithuania only in the autumn of 1252. The coronation of Mindaugas took place in July 1253, and Christian was present at the ceremony. For reasons unknown, Heidenreich did not consecrate the new bishop. On 24 June 1253, the pope instead addressed a letter to Albert, Archbishop of Riga, instructing him to choose and ordain a bishop for Lithuania, subordinate to the Apostolic See. On 21 August 1253, the pope clearly designated Christian as the new bishop to Albert, according to Mindaugas’ wishes. Albert appointed Christian as bishop but, contrary to the pope’s order, required him to swear an oath to himself, thereby subordinating the new bishopric to Riga.

Mindaugas undertook efforts to have this overlordship abolished. On 3 September 1254, the pope instructed the Bishop of Naumburg to receive from the Lithuanian bishop an oath of fidelity to the pope. On 20 September 1254, in bulls addressed to the Lithuanian bishop and to the bishop of Dorpat, he annulled Christian’s initial oath and removed his bishopric from the jurisdiction of the archbishop of Riga, granting the latter only protective oversight of the Lithuanian bishopric.

It is possible that Heidenreich did not appoint his own candidate because he recognized the consecration of the Dominican Wit as Bishop of Lithuania, performed by Pełka, Archbishop of Gniezno, in 1253. It is possible that Wit accompanied him on his journey to Lithuania. At that time, the affiliation of the Chełmno bishopric to a specific metropolitan see had not yet been fully clarified. Although the bishop of Riga claimed the right of overlordship over Chełmno, Heidenreich still participated in synods of Polish bishops. However, it is more likely that Wit, whose consecration was sponsored by the Masovian duke Siemowit I, limited his authority to the lands taken by Siemowit from the Yotvingians. In any case, Wit soon resigned from the bishopric and died in 1260 with a reputation for holiness.

=== Episcopal ministry ===
In March 1254, Mindaugas endowed the bishopric with numerous grants in Samogitia, a land not yet fully controlled by Mindaugas. In April 1254, Christian granted the Teutonic Order tithes from the estates he had received from the king. In a letter from March 1255, Pope Alexander IV admonished Mindaugas to protect Christian from the pagans. This is the last document confirming Christian’s presence in Lithuania. By 1257, he is already recorded outside its borders. In 1257, Christian appears as an auxiliary bishop of the Archdiocese of Cologne. He is recorded in sources up until his death around 1270.

The reasons for Christian’s departure from Lithuania are unknown. Most likely, neither Mindaugas nor the Teutonic Order were able to provide him with conditions suitable for carrying out his priestly ministry.

== Bibliography ==
- Rowell, Stephen Christopher; Baronas, Darius (2015). The Conversion of Lithuania. From Pagan Barbarians to Late Medieval Christians. Vilnius: Institute of Lithuanian Literature and Folklore. ISBN 978-609-425-152-8.
- Szweda, Adam (2002). "Problem biskupa litewskiego Wita" (PDF). Komunikaty Mazursko-Warmińskie. 3.
- Wiśniewska, Anna (1992). Henryk - Heidenryk. Pierwszy biskup chełmiński. Pelplin.
