= Juozas Kralikauskas =

Juozas Kralikauskas (October 22, 1910 – February 25, 2007 in Vilnius, Lithuania) was a novelist and short story author.

== Biography ==
Kralikauskas graduated from the seminary in Kaunas in 1928. After spending some years teaching, he attended a military academy and Vytautas Magnus University, graduating from the latter with a degree in the humanities in 1940. In 1944 he moved to Ontario, Canada, and worked in the Pickle Lake gold mines. He returned to Lithuania in 1994.

== Work ==
His literary debut was made in 1937 with the short story Septyni kalavijai (Seven Swords). His next work, Urviniai žmonės (Cave People), did not appear until 1954. His literary output from then until his death consisted of historical fiction dramatizing the lives of Mindaugas, Vaišvilkas, Tautvila, Martynas Mažvydas, and other medieval figures. The novels include metaphysical and psychoanalytical elements. They have been translated into Russian, Georgian, Ukrainian, Chinese, and other languages.

He was awarded the Order of the Lithuanian Grand Duke Gediminas Fifth Class in 1999.

== Bibliography ==
- Septyni kalavijai: short stories. - Kaunas, 1937.
- Urviniai žmonės: novel. - Chicago: Lietuviškos knygos klubas, 1954.
- Šviesa lange: novel. - London: Nidos knygų klubas, 1960.
- Titnago ugnis: novel. - Chicago: Lietuviškos knygos klubas, 1962.
- Mindaugo nužudymas: awarded novel. - Chicago: Lietuviškos knygos klubas, 1964.
- Vaišvilkas: novel. - Chicago: Lietuviškos knygos klubas, 1971.
- Tautvila: novel. - Chicago: Lietuviškosios knygos klubas, 1973.
- Martynas Mažvydas Vilniuje : novel. - Chicago: Lietuviškos knygos klubas, 1976.
- Įkaitę Vilniaus akmenys: novel. - Chicago: Lietuviškos knygos klubas, 1979.
- Po ultimatumo: novel. - Chicago: Lietuviškos knygos klubas, 1980.
- Ąžuolai piliakalnyje: devynių istorinių romanų gelmenys ir problemos. - Torontas: Tėviškės Žiburiai, 1984.
- Vėlinės: long short story. - Toronto: [s.n.], 1988.
- Įkaitę Vilniaus mūrai: long short stories. - Vilnius: Vaga, 1991.
- Psichologijos įvadas. - Kaunas: Šviesa, 1993.
- Titnago ugnis: historical novel. - Vilnius: Vyturys, 1993.
- Mindaugas: historical novel. - Kaišiadorys: Kaišiadorių vyskupijos kurijos leidykla, 1995.
- Urviniai: long short story and short stories. - Vilnius: Vaga, 1996.
- Mažvydas: novel. - Vilnius: Lithuanian Writers Union Publishers, 1997.
- Mindaugo kapas: novel. - Vilnius: Tyto alba, 2000.
- Dinastijos žūtis: novel. - Vilnius: Tyto alba, 2002.
