= Wit (bishop) =

Polish bishop

Servant of God Vitus of Poland OP
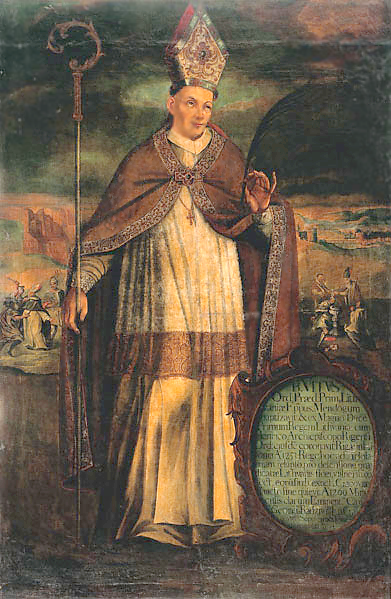
- 17th-century portrait of Vitus
- Born: unknown Kingdom of Poland
- Died: c. 1269

Vitus O.P. (died c. 1269) was a Polish Dominican friar from the Kraków convent and the first bishop in Lithuania (1253–1255). Though venerated as a "blessed" by the Order of Preachers, his cause for beatification is still within preliminary stages.

== Biography ==
Little is known about his origins, early career or his episcopal work. It is likely that he was a student of the first Polish Dominican, Hyacinth of Poland.

Following the conversion to Christianity and coronation of King Mindaugas during the summer of 1253, there was some delay in appointing a bishop for the Kingdom of Lithuania due to political intrigues. In October or November 1253, Pełka, Bishop of Gniezno, consecrated Vitus and tasked him with the conversion of the Lithuanian people. His consecration was sponsored by Duke of Mazovia Siemowit I of Masovia. The real field of activity of Vitus was probably the Yotvingian lands, over which Siemowit extended his authority.

In 1254, the priest Christian, a member of the Livonian Order, was appointed bishop and recognised by King Mindaugas with the grant of lands in Samogitia. Vitus probably had no real contacts with Mindaugas or with Christian. In 1254, Vitus wrote to Pope Innocent IV about the deplorable conditions of Christians in Lithuania and asked for a transfer. On March 1, 1255, Pope Alexander IV granted Vitus' petition.

Pope appointed Vitus as an auxiliary bishop of the Diocese of Wrocław, where he served till about 1260, when he was made auxiliary bishop in the Diocese of Poznań, at least until 1263. Historian Jan Kurczewski believes that Vitus established a Dominican church and monastery in the city of Lyubcha, in present-day Belarus.

There have been suggestions that he died as a martyr.

== Bibliography ==
- Rowell, Stephen Christopher; Baronas, Darius (2015). The Conversion of Lithuania. From Pagan Barbarians to Late Medieval Christians. Vilnius: Institute of Lithuanian Literature and Folklore. ISBN 978-609-425-152-8.
