= Daujotas =

13th-century Lithuanian noble

Daujotas was one of the five elder Lithuanian dukes mentioned in the peace treaty with Galicia–Volhynia in 1219. In the same document Vilikaila is mentioned as brother of Daujotas, which suggests that Daujotas was the older or perhaps more influential brother. The brothers are not mentioned in any other sources. Tomas Baranauskas, a modern Lithuanian historian, believes that Vilikaila and Daujotas might be sons of Stekšys, a Lithuanian duke killed in 1214.
