= Vilikaila =

13th-century Lithuanian duke

Vilikaila or Viligaila was one of the five elder Lithuanian dukes mentioned in the peace treaty with Galicia–Volhynia in 1219. He is mentioned as brother of Daujotas, which leads scholars to believe he was the younger or perhaps less influential brother. The brothers are not mentioned in any other sources. Tomas Baranauskas, a modern Lithuanian historian, believes that Vilikaila and Daujotas might be sons of Stekšys, a Lithuanian duke killed in 1214.

== Sources ==
- Baranauskas, Tomas. "Brandieji viduramžiai: II dalis (1183-1283 m.)". Chronologija (in Lithuanian). Lietuvos.net. Archived from the original on 2006-12-25.
