= Stekšys =

13th-century Lithuanian noble

Stekšys (or Steksė) (other spellings include Stakys, Stejkint, Stekintas, Stegikintas, Stegutas) was a duke of Lithuania, killed in 1214 near Lielvārde during an attack against Livonia. He is one of the earliest mentioned Lithuanian dukes. He succeeded duke Daugirutis, who killed himself while in Livonian captivity in 1213. After these two deaths, Lithuanian raids to the Livonian lands decreased in frequency and historians assume a period of decline in the unification process of the Baltic tribes.

Tomas Baranauskas suggests that Daujotas and Vilikaila, dukes mentioned in a 1219 treaty with Galicia–Volhynia, were Stekšys' sons.
