= Mongol invasions of Lithuania =

- Part of the Mongol invasions of Europe
Date	1237–1275
Location	Lithuania and surrounding regions
Territorial changes	Devastation of Lithuanian territories

Belligerents
Mongol Empire; Golden Horde (after 1259)	Grand Duchy of Lithuania; Lithuanian tribal confederations

Commanders and leaders
Batu Khan; Orda Khan; Talabuga Khan; Nogai Khan	Unknown Lithuanian dukes; Mindaugas (later)

Strength
Unknown (estimated 20,000–40,000 during major raids)	Unknown

Casualties and losses
Unknown	Heavy; multiple settlements destroyed

The Mongol invasions of Lithuania was an event where the Mongol armies invaded the territories of the Kingdom of Lithuania and later, the Grand Duchy of Lithuania, on several occasions in late 13th and early 14th century. The event is not very well documented. In due course, however, the Lithuanians were able to take control of a number of former Mongol territories, expand their influence in Eastern Europe, and contribute to the liberation of neighbouring peoples.

== Lithuanian–Mongol conflict ==
The Lithuanians first made contact with the Mongols around 1237–1240, though for the next decade or two the Mongols did not consider Lithuanian-held territories a priority.

In 1258–59, a joint Mongol-Rus'ian army led by Burundai launched a campaign against the Kingdom of Lithuania ruled by Mindaugas, devastating the country. It was in response to Lithuanian incursions on Mongol-held territories in 1255 and 1258. Although the young state managed to survive this defeat, it likely played a crucial role in determining its further religious orientation as Mindaugas was starting to lose his allies and pro-pagan sentiments reemerged. The threat posed by the Mongols and lack of any meaningful support from the Roman Curia, led to Treniota and his accomplices forcing Mindaugas to renounce his union with the Livonian Order for an alliance with Alexandr Nevsky, who was a docile subject of the Tatars. The temporary shifting of the allegiance of its successor, the Grand Duchy of Lithuania, toward the Mongols, or at least, away from the Christian Europe, was also a short-term victory for the Mongols.

After raiding Lithuania and the Yotvingians, the next year, two tumens (20,000 men), under the leadership of Berke, attacked Poland (in what is known as the Second Mongol invasion of Poland).

In the immediate aftermath of this invasion, Lithuania might have become a tributary and ally to the Horde for several years or decades. A similar fate was likely met by the Lithuanian neighbours, the Yotvingians. Some Lithuanian or Yotvingian warriors likely participated in the Mongol invasion of Poland in 1259, though there are no historical documents to clarify whether they did so with their leaders' permission, or as free mercenaries, or as forced troops. According to Krakowski, the term 'Prussian' mentioned in the historical accounts could also cover some Yotvingian and Lithuanian units. Gregorz Błaszczyk believes that such a position belongs to the sphere of hypotheses.

Nonetheless, the invasion did not have major or lasting consequences for Lithuania, particularly as it was not directly incorporated into the Mongol Empire, nor subject to Mongol darughachi administration.

== Legacy ==
Mongols raided Lithuania again in 1275, 1279, and 1325.

Overall, the Mongols did not make any major effort to conquer Lithuania. In time, the Grand Duchy of Lithuania became a rival to the Golden Horde, taking over some of the former Kievan Rus' territories controlled by the Mongols as the Horde became weakened in the 13th and 14th centuries, though it lacked manpower to threaten Mongol territories outside of northeastern Europe.

== See also ==
- Mongol invasion of Europe
