= List of early Lithuanian dukes =

This is a list of early Lithuanian dukes who reigned before the Lithuanians were united by Mindaugas into a state known as the Grand Duchy of Lithuania. While the Palemonids legend provides genealogy from the 10th century, only a few dukes were mentioned by contemporary historical sources. All of them were mentioned in written sources the 13th century. Data about them is extremely scarce and is usually limited to few brief sentences. The primary sources are the Chronicle of Henry of Livonia and Hypatian Codex.

== List ==
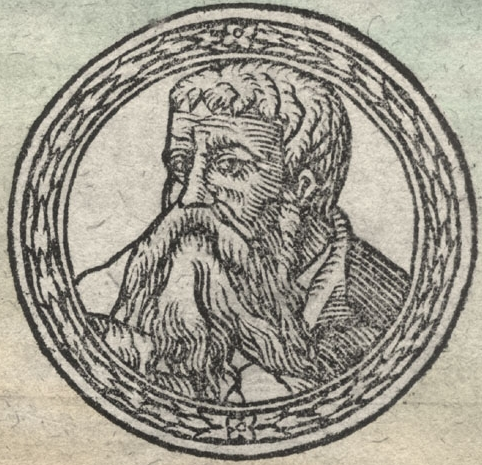
Vykintas, one of the early Samogitian dukes, as depicted by Alexander Guagnini

- Netimeras – referred to as a king in the 1009 Annals of Quedlinburg and baptized by Bruno of Querfurt.
- Žvelgaitis (Svelgates) – earliest known duke. In 1205, he attacked Riga and was killed in the battle, led by ruler of Semigallia, Vester.
- Daugirutis (Dangerutis, Dangeruthe) – Livonians imprisoned this Lithuanian duke in 1213, where he killed himself.
- Stekšys (Stakys, Steksė) – another powerful duke, killed in 1214 near Lielvārde.
- Father of Mindaugas – several sources mention that he was a powerful duke, but do not give his name. 16th century genealogies gave him the name of Ryngold or Ringaudas.
- The following Lithuanian dukes signed a peace treaty with the rulers of Galicia–Volhynia in 1219:
  - Duke elders
    - Živinbudas (presumably the eldest duke)
    - Daujotas
    - Dausprungas
    - Mindaugas (brother of Dausprungas)
    - Vilikaila or Viligaila (brother of Daujotas)
  - Rulers of Samogitia
    - Erdvilas
    - Vykintas
  - Ruškaičiai family
    - Kintibutas
    - Vembutas
    - Butautas
    - Vyžeitis
    - Velžys (son of Vyžeitis)
    - Kitenis
    - Plikienė (wife of Plikys, probably a widow)
  - Bulionys family (three brothers, all of them killed by Mindaugas)
    - Vismantas (his wife was taken by Mindaugas for himself)
    - Gedvilas
    - Sprudeikis
  - Rulers of the duchy of Deltuva
    - Juodikis
    - Buteikis
    - Bikšys
    - Ligeikis

Of the dukes who signed the peace treaty, only four are mentioned in other written sources: Mindaugas, who went on to become the Grand Duke of Lithuania and was crowned as King of Lithuania in 1253, Vykintas, leader of anti-Mindaugas coalition during the civil war in 1248–1251, Bikšys and Ligeikis, both identified as Mindaugas relatives and nobles, mentioned in a document, dated 1260 and sometimes considered a forgery.

== See also ==
- Palemonids – a list of early mythological rulers of Lithuania
- List of Lithuanian rulers
- List of Lithuanian monarchs
