= Betygala =

- Town
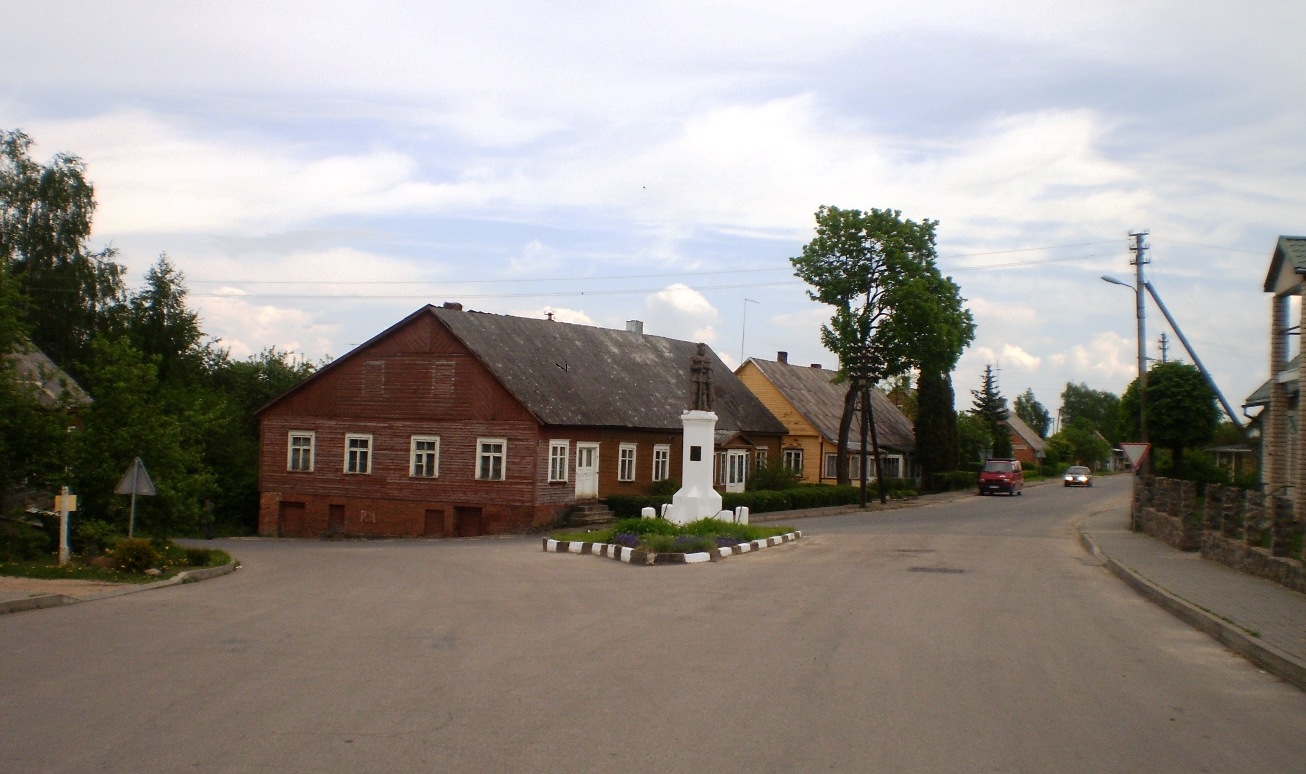
- Monument for Vytautas in the center of Betygala

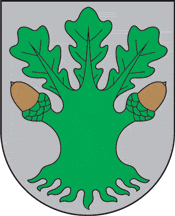
- Coat of arms

- Location in Lithuania
- Coordinates: 55°21′40″N 23°22′0″E
- Country: Lithuania
- Ethnographic region: Samogitia
- County: Kaunas County
- Municipality: Raseiniai district municipality
- Eldership: Betygala eldership
- Capital of: Betygala eldership

Population (2011)
  - Total: 488
- Time zone: UTC+2 (EET)
  - Summer (DST): UTC+3 (EEST)

Betygala is a small town in Kaunas County in central Lithuania. As of 2011 it had a population of 488. In the 13th and 14th centuries the town had a noted Samogitan fortress, attacked by the Teutonic Knights numerous time. One of the first churches in Lithuania was built in the town. Mikalojus Daukša was the parish pastor from 1592 to 1603.
