= Žvelgaitis =

Lithuanian duke (died 1205)

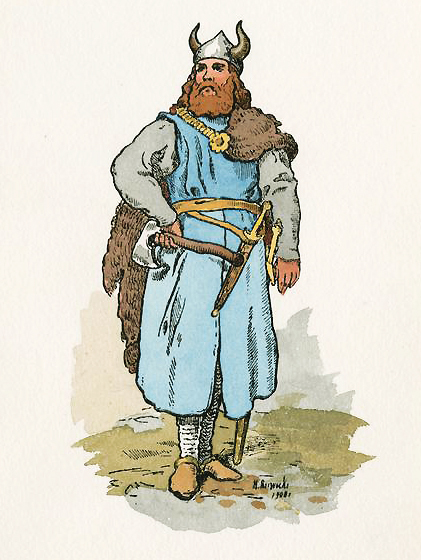
- Artistic impression of Žvelgaitis, 1908
- Reign: ? – February 1205
- Died: 23 February 1205 near Ropaži
- Religion: Baltic religion

Žvelgaitis (Latin: Suelgate; died 1205) was a Lithuanian duke. He is the first Lithuanian duke whose name is known from reliable sources. The account of his campaign and death is given in Livonian Chronicle of Henry by Henry of Latvia, an early thirteenth-century German chronicler of Latvian history, spanning the years 1186-1227. Žvelgaitis is called "rich and powerful," but he was not the supreme duke, as he led the army in the name of another, more powerful duke.

== Campaign ==
In 1205, Žvelgaitis led several thousand horsemen northward, from Lithuania through Riga, on the way to attack and plunder Estonia. Returning from Estonia mid-winter, with booty and Estonian slaves, his troops were caught unaware and attacked while crossing through waist-high snowdrifts near Ropaži. He was attacked by the Livonian and German citizens of Riga, under the leadership of Viestards (Vester), ruler of Semigallians, coordinating the attack from a sleigh. Žvelgaitis was killed by a javelin thrown by German Theodore Schilling. 1,200 Lithuanian soldiers perished; the Estonian slaves were slaughtered as well, in retribution for "past crimes" against the Livonians. In Lithuania, the return of Žvelgaitis was missed, and it is said that as many as fifty wives of the Lithuanian soldiers killed themselves in grief, hoping to be all the sooner at the sides of their slain husbands.

== Archeology ==
There is the Žvelgaitis mound by Žagarė, officially known as the Žagarė I hillfort. A 2010 dig revealed that most likely the fort was built by the Germans, rather than Balts.

== See also ==
- List of early Lithuanian dukes
