= Tomas Baranauskas =

Lithuanian historian

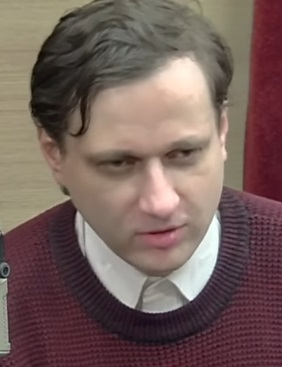
Tomas Baranauskas in 2015, participating in a radio show with Algirdas Ramanauskas at Žinių radijas

Tomas Baranauskas (born 12 September 1973 in Kaunas) is a Lithuanian historian specializing in the history of medieval Lithuania.

Baranauskas spent his youth in Žeimelis and Anykščiai. In 1998, he graduated from the Faculty of History at the Vilnius University. Since September 1996 he works in the Lithuanian Institute of History.

At the end of May 2000, he published The Formation of the Lithuanian State ("Lietuvos valstybės ištakos"). In the book Baranauskas argued that the Grand Duchy of Lithuania formed earlier than generally accepted; i.e. that the state was founded before King Mindaugas. The book received mixed reviews from academics.

Since 22 June 2000 Baranauskas maintains the largest site on the medieval history of Lithuania on the Internet – "Medieval Lithuania". Since March 2003 he also administers the official website of the Lithuanian Institute of History.

Baranauskas coined the term "Litvinism" for the theory and idea existing in Belarus according to which the Grand Duchy of Lithuania and medieval Lithuanians were Belarusian.

== Books ==
- Lietuvos valstybės ištakos, Vilnius, 2000, 317 p. ISBN 5-415-01495-0. - Summary: The Formation of the Lithuanian State
- Vorutos pilis, Vilnius, 2001, 16 p. (together with Gintautas Zabiela) ISBN 9986-23-087-X.
- Lietuvos istorijos kalendorius. 2002, Vilnius, 2001. ISBN 9986-34-086-1.
- Lietuvos istorijos bibliografija. 1998, Vilnius, 2005, 333 p. ISSN 1392-981X.
- Anykščių medinė pilis, Anykščiai, 2005, 16 p.
