= Živinbudas =

13th-century Lithuanian duke

Živinbudas was one of the five senior Lithuanian dukes mentioned in the treaty with Galicia–Volhynia in 1219. The treaty lists a total of 21 dukes, five of them being elder or superior. Since Živinbudas is mentioned first in the list, it is presumed that he was the supreme ruler of Lithuania. He is not mentioned in any other sources and the mention in the treaty is the only bit of information available about him. However, some historians argue he was ancestor of Traidenis, the grand duke of Lithuania from c. 1270 to 1282. This may be due to the influence of the legend of the Palemonids, which was popularized by falsified 16th-century genealogies and connected a mythical Palemon, a prince of Venice who settled in Lithuania in the 10th century, to the Gediminids, an established dynasty.
