= Principality of Jersika =

Latgalian principality (10th century–1239)

Coordinates: 56°16′33.26″N 26°12′7.18″E

Principality of Jersika terra Lettia (Latin) Лотыголa (Russian)
- 1041/1190–1239
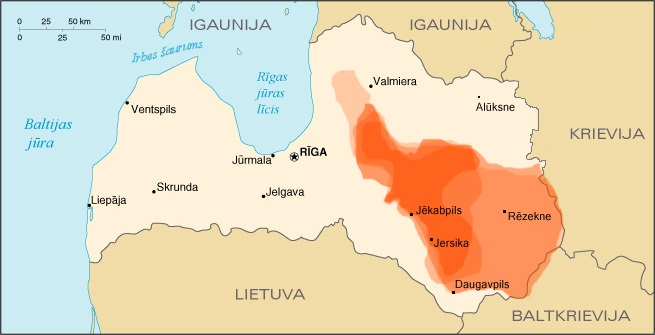
- Principality of Jersika in the 12th–13th centuries
- Capital: Jersika
- Common languages: Latgalian
- Religion: Eastern Orthodoxy, Paganism
- Government: Monarchy
- Prince
  - 13th century: Visvaldis
- History
  - Established: 1041/1190
  - Disestablished: 1239
Preceded by	Succeeded by
Principality of Polotsk	Bishopric of Riga; Livonian Order
- Today part of: Latvia

The Principality of Jersika (Latin: Gerzika, terra Lettia; German: Gerzika, Zargrad; Russian: Герсикское княжество, Ерсикское княжество) was a medieval Latgalian principality in the east of modern-day Latvia, and one of the largest medieval states in Latvia before the Northern Crusades. The capital of Jersika was located on a hill fort 165 kilometres (103 mi) southeast of Riga. In documents dating to the 13th century, the western part of the principality was called Lettia, and the eastern part by the Russian name Lotygola.

== Territory ==
Jersika's occupied territory includes a large territory of modern-day Latgale and Vidzeme. In the North bordering Tālava and Atzele, in the east bordering Polotsk, then in the south bordering Lithuania and Selonia and finally in the west bordering Koknese and Livonian Daugava. According to Arveds Švābe the Principality consisted of five territories which in 1209 lost two called ″Autine″ and ″Cesvaine″ but kept three territories from Lotigola.

=== Capital city ===
The principality's capital city was located on a hill fort in Līvāni Municipality, on the right bank of the Daugava between two small rivers with deep ravines. The hill fort now is 18 m high on the side of the Daugava bank, but on the northern side it is fortified with a 2 m high embankment, counting from the 100 m long and 75 m wide area and on the left bank is the Dignāja mound.

== History ==
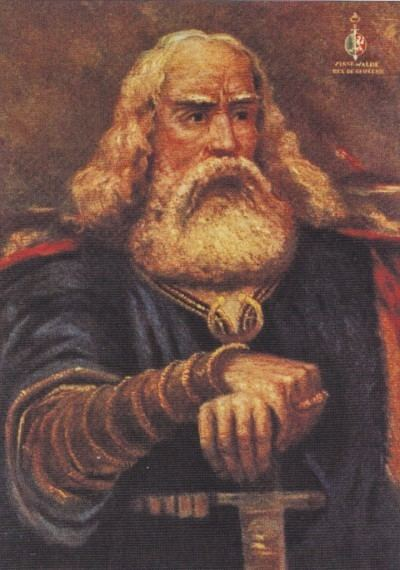
Visvaldis, the prince of the Principality of Jersika

It has been suggested that the Principality of Jersika had emerged in 1041 when the Norwegian king Eymund according to the Eymundar þáttr hrings, became the leader of the Principality of Polotsk and expanded its influence in the Daugava basin. But the existence of the Principality in the 12th century as an old trade route from the Varangians to the Greeks is more certain. In the Livonian Chronicle of Henry, the Principality and its ruler Visvaldis are first mentioned in 1203 with connection with his and the Lithuanians raid under the newly founded city of Riga.

In 1209, Visvaldis, the prince of Jersika, was defeated by the bishop Albert of Riga and the Livonian Brothers of the Sword, and his Lithuanian wife was taken as a prisoner. He was forced to submit his kingdom to Albert as a grant to the Bishopric of Riga and received back only a portion of it as a fief. He lost the lands of Autīne and Cesvaine, but retained Jersika, Mākoņkalns and Naujiene. Visvaldis' feudal charter is the oldest such document surviving in Latvia, and in this charter, Visvaldis is called "the king of Jersika" (Vissewalde, rex de Gercike; in another document also Wiscewolodus rex de Berzika).

In 1211, the part of Jersika controlled by Albert which was known as "Lettia" (terra, quae Lettia dicitur) was divided between the bishopric of Riga and the Livonian Brothers of the Sword. In 1212, Polotsk gave up its tributary rights over Jersika in favor of Bishop Albert. In 1214, Germans attacked the Castle of Jersika and sacked it. The Baltic German Uexküll family claimed that Conrad Uexküll had married the daughter of Visvaldis.

After the death of Visvaldis in 1239, his fief passed to the Livonian Order, but this was repeatedly contested by the rulers of Lithuania and Novgorod, who periodically sought to conquer the territory. Russian chronicles from Novgorod and Pskov often applied the name Lotygola (Russian: Лотыгола) to the region. The Novgorod First Chronicle mentions that, following the Battle on the Ice in 1242, the Germans left the previously conquered territories of Vod, Luga, Pskov and Lotygola (Latgale).

== See also ==
- Bibliography of Russian history
