= Mindaugas =

Ruler of Lithuania from 1236 to 1263

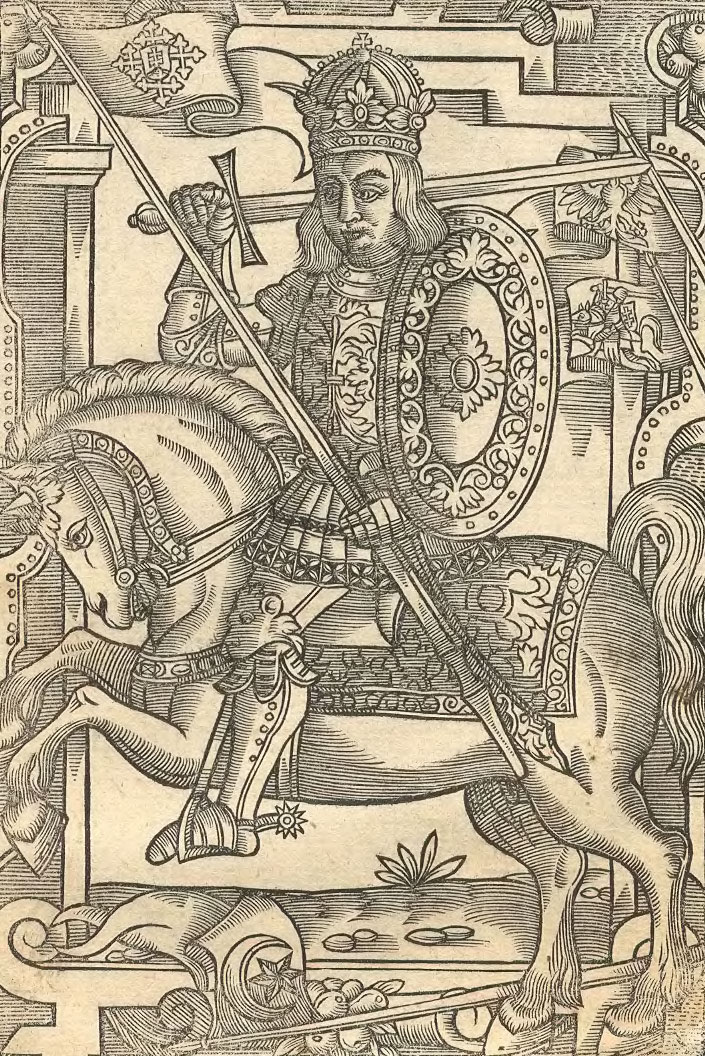
- Mindaugas, as depicted in the chronicles of Alexander Guagnini (1611)

King of Lithuania
- Reign: 17 July 1251 (Note: Baranauskas, Tomas (23 March 2002). "Mindaugo karūnavimo ir Lietuvos karalystės problemos". Voruta (54). Archived from the original on 26 October 2005. "(...) Mindaugas' coronation was a consequence of the establishment of the Kingdom of Lithuania, not a cause. The Kingdom of Lithuania had been officially legalized (...) on July 17, 1251 by a bull of Pope Innocent IV. It was then that the Pope gave permission and an order to crown Mindaugas the King of Lithuania. This was the true international recognition of the Kingdom of Lithuania.")–12 September 1263
- Coronation: 1253
- Predecessor: Himself (as Grand Duke)
- Successor: Treniota (as Grand Duke)

Grand Duke of Lithuania
- Reign: 1236–17 July 1251
- Successor: Himself (as King)
- Born: c. 1203
- Died: 12 September 1263
- Spouse: Unknown first wife Morta; Sister of Morta
- Issue at least 3 more...: Vaišvilkas
- House: House of Mindaugas
- Religion: Lithuanian polytheism (1203–1251; 1261-1263) Roman Catholic (1251–1261)

Mindaugas (Note: in other languages Mindaugas is known as: German: Myndowen, Latin: Mindowe, Old East Slavic: Мендог, romanized: Mendog, Belarusian: Міндоўг, romanized: Mindowh, Polish: Mendog) (c. 1203 – 12 September 1263) was the first known Grand Duke of Lithuania and the only crowned King of Lithuania. Little is known of his origins, early life, or rise to power; he is mentioned in a 1219 treaty as an elder duke, and in 1236 as the leader of all the Lithuanians. The contemporary and modern sources discussing his ascent mention strategic marriages along with banishment or murder of his rivals. He extended his domain into regions southeast of Lithuania proper during the 1230s and 1240s. In 1250 or 1251, during the course of internal power struggles, he was baptized as a Roman Catholic; this action enabled him to establish an alliance with the Livonian Order, a long-standing antagonist of the Lithuanians. By 1245, Mindaugas was already being referred to as "the highest king" in certain documents. During the summer of 1253, he was crowned king, ruling between 300,000 and 400,000 subjects, and was nicknamed as Mindaugas the Sapient by the Livonians.

While Mindaugas's reign as king was marked by many state-building accomplishments, his conflicts with relatives and other dukes continued. The western part of Lithuania – Samogitia – strongly resisted the alliance's rule. His gains in the southeast were challenged by the Tatars. He broke peace with the Livonian Order in 1261, possibly renouncing Christianity, and was assassinated in 1263 by his nephew Treniota and another rival, Duke Daumantas of Pskov. His three immediate successors were assassinated as well. The disorder was not resolved until Traidenis gained the title of grand duke c. 1270.

Although his reputation was unsettled during the following centuries and his descendants were not notable, he gained standing during the 19th and 20th centuries. Mindaugas was the only king of Lithuania; while most of the Lithuanian grand dukes from Jogaila onward also reigned as kings of Poland, the titles remained separate. Now generally considered the founder of the Lithuanian state, he is also now credited with stopping the advance of the Tatars towards the Baltic Sea, establishing international recognition of Lithuania, and turning it towards Western civilization. In the 1990s the historian Edvardas Gudavičius published research supporting an exact coronation date – 6 July 1253. Although disputed, this day is now an official national holiday in Lithuania, Statehood Day.

== Background ==
=== Sources ===
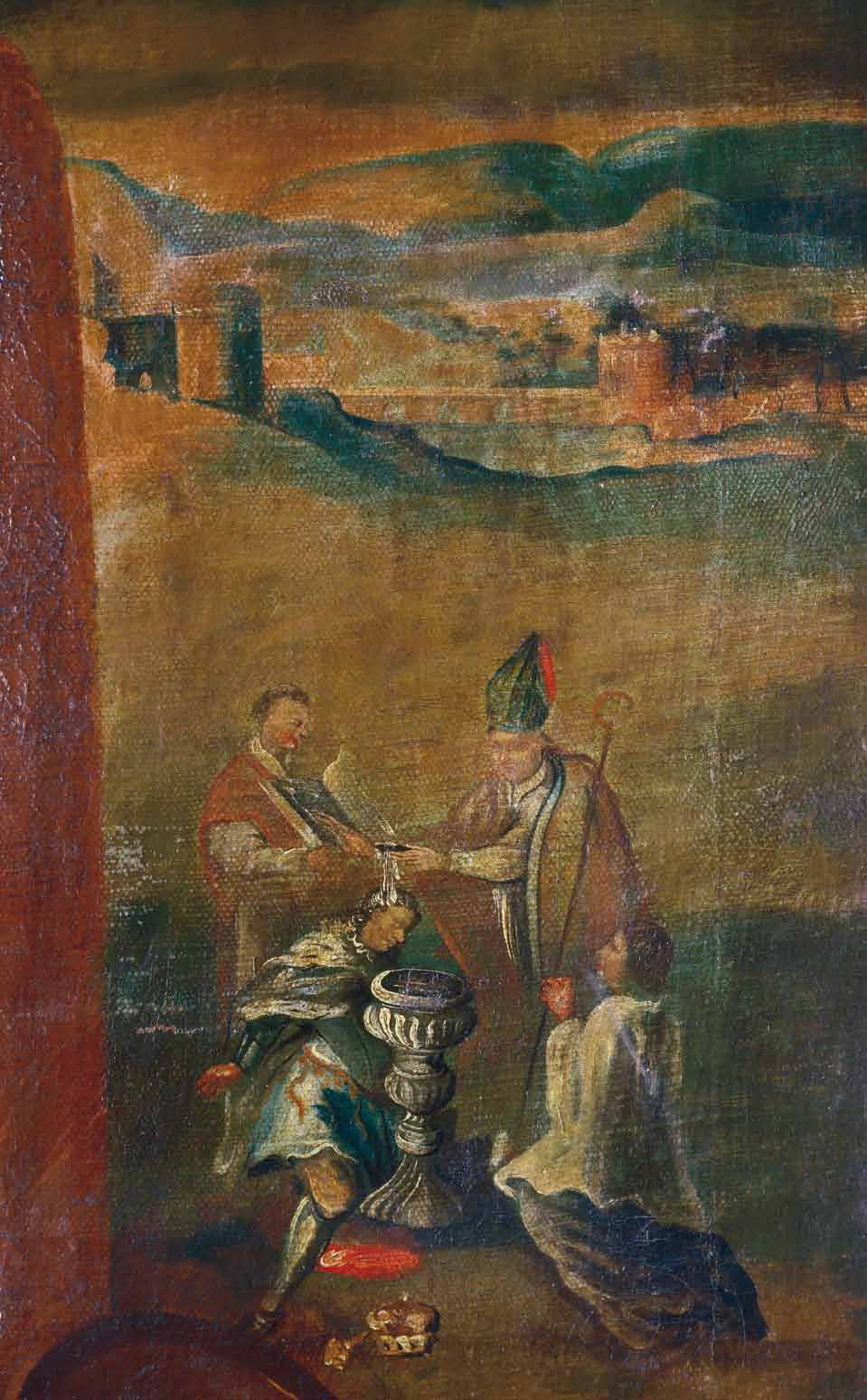
17th-century depiction of the baptism of Mindaugas

Contemporary written sources about Mindaugas are very scarce. Much of what is known about his reign is obtained from the Livonian Rhymed Chronicle and the Hypatian Codex. Both of these chronicles were produced by enemies of Lithuania and thus have anti-Lithuanian bias, particularly the Hypatian Codex. They are also incomplete: both of them lack dates and locations even for the most important events. For example, the Livonian Rhymed Chronicle devotes 125 lines of poetry to Mindaugas's coronation, but fails to mention either the date or the location.

Kronika polska, litewska, żmódzka i wszystkiej Rusi, published by Maciej Stryjkowski in 1582, asserts that in 1240 Mindaugas ascended to his father's throne in Navahrudak. While ruling in Navahrudak and other Rus' castles, he began to eliminate his friends, seduced by the greed for power.

The chronicle Boguchwala i Godyslawa Paska describes Mindaugas as a ruthless king of Prussia, who, in 1260, withdrew from the Christian faith and obliterated the Mazovian city of Płock and Prussia committing a great slaughter among the Christian people. Other important sources are the papal bulls regarding the baptism and coronation of Mindaugas. The Lithuanians did not produce any surviving records themselves, except for a series of acts granting lands to the Livonian Order, but their authenticity is disputed. Due to the lack of sources, some important questions regarding Mindaugas and his reign cannot be answered.

=== Family ===
Because written sources covering the era are scarce, Mindaugas's origins and family tree have not been conclusively established. The Bychowiec Chronicles, dating from the 16th and 17th centuries, have been discredited in this regard, since they assert an ancestry from the Palemonids, a noble family said to have originated within the Roman Empire. His year of birth, sometimes given as c. 1200, is at other times left as a question mark. His father is mentioned in the Livonian Rhymed Chronicle as a powerful duke (ein kunic grôß), but is not named; later chronicles give his name as Ryngold. Dausprungas, mentioned in the text of a 1219 treaty, is presumed to have been his brother, and Dausprungas' sons Tautvilas and Gedvydas his nephews. He is thought to have had two sisters, one married to Vykintas and another to Daniel of Halych. Vykintas and his son Treniota played major roles in later power struggles. Mindaugas had at least two wives, Morta and Morta's sister, whose name is unknown, and possibly an earlier wife; her existence is presumed because two children – a son named Vaišvilkas and an unnamed daughter married to Svarn in 1255 – were already leading independent lives when Morta's children were still young. In addition to Vaišvilkas and his sister, two sons, Ruklys and Rupeikis, are mentioned in written sources. The latter two were assassinated along with Mindaugas. Information on his sons is limited and historians continue to discuss their number. He may have had two other sons whose names were later conflated by scribes into Ruklys and Rupeikis.

=== Name ===
In the 13th century Lithuania had little contact with foreign lands. Lithuanian names sounded obscure and unfamiliar to various chroniclers, who altered them to sound more like names in their native language. Mindaugas's name in historic texts was recorded in various distorted forms: Mindowe, Mendog, Mindog, and Mendolphus in Latin; Mindouwe, Myndow, Myndawe, and Mindaw in German; Mendog, Mondog, Mendoch, and Mindovg in Polish; and Mindovg and Mindog in Russian, among others. Since Russian sources provide the most information about Mindaugas's life, they were judged the most reliable by linguists reconstructing his original Lithuanian name. The most popular Russian rendition was Mindovg, which can quite easily and naturally be reconstructed as Mindaugas or Mindaugis. In 1909 the Lithuanian linguist Kazimieras Būga published a research paper supporting the suffix -as, which has since been widely accepted. Mindaugas is an archaic dithematic Lithuanian name, used before the Christianization of Lithuania, and consists of two components: min and daug. Its etymology may be traced to daug menąs (much wisdom) or daugio minimas (much fame).

== Rise to power ==
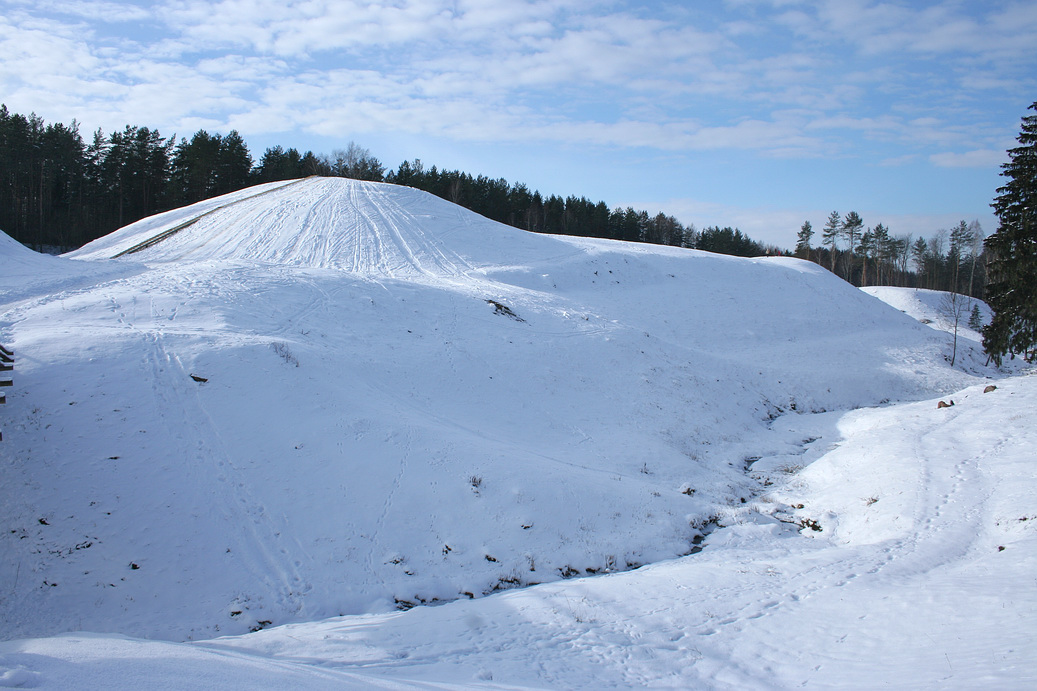
Šeimyniškėliai Hillfort, possibly the site of Voruta Castle, alleged capital of Mindaugas

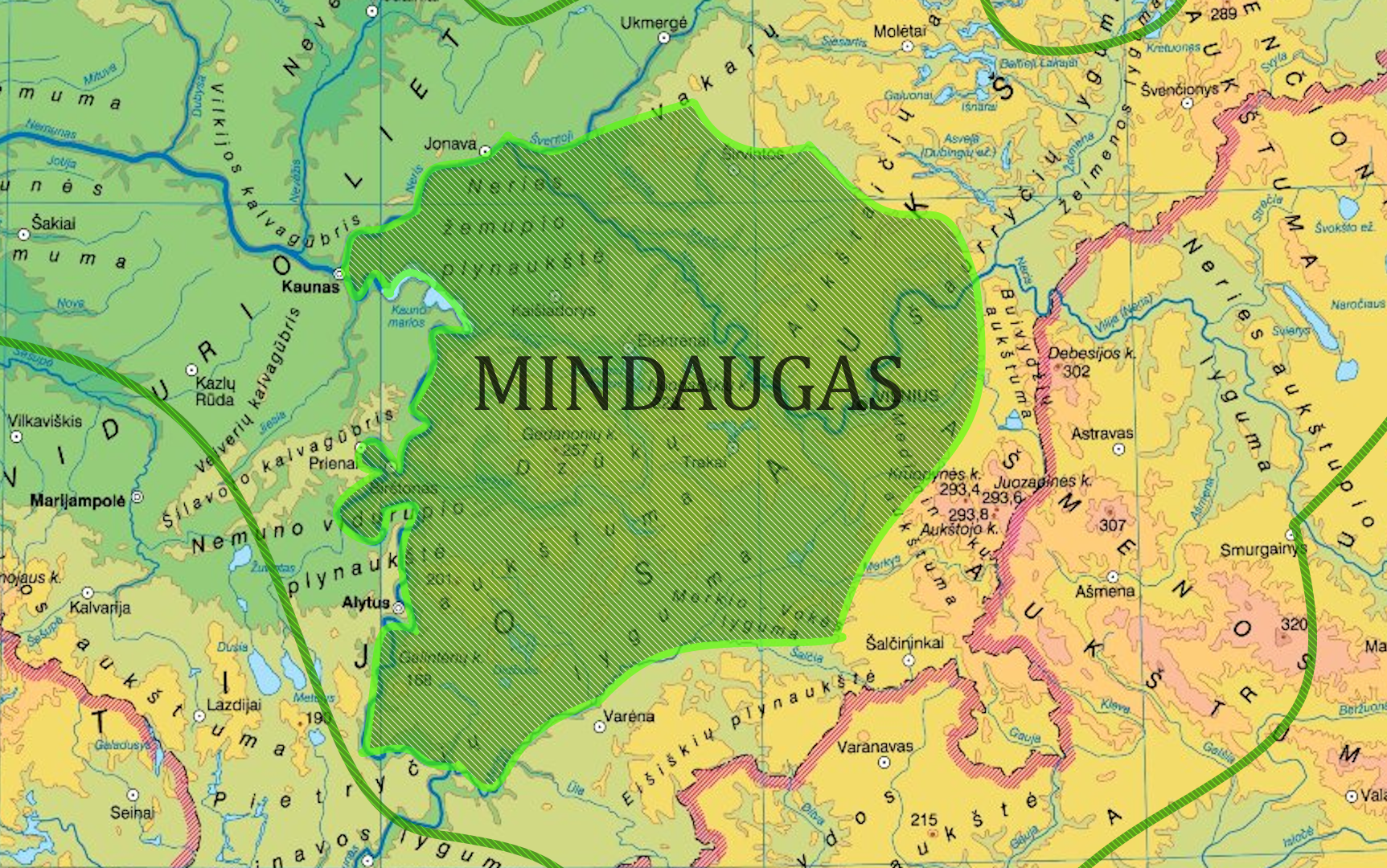
The presumed dominion controlled by Mindaugas during the start of the 13th century

Lithuania was ruled during the early 13th century by a number of dukes and princes presiding over various fiefdoms and tribes. They were loosely bonded by commonalities of religion and tradition, trade, kinship, joint military campaigns, and the presence of captured prisoners from neighboring areas. Western merchants and missionaries began seeking control of the area during the 12th century, establishing the city of Riga in Latvia in 1201. Their efforts in Lithuania were temporarily halted by defeat at the Battle of Saule in 1236, but armed Christian orders continued to pose a threat. The country had also undergone incursions by the Mongol Empire.

A treaty with Galicia–Volhynia, signed in 1219, is usually considered the first conclusive evidence that the Baltic tribes in the area were uniting in response to these threats. The treaty's signatories include twenty Lithuanian dukes and one dowager duchess; it specifies that five of these were elder and thus took precedence over the remaining sixteen. Mindaugas, despite his youth, as well as his brother Dausprungas are listed among the elder dukes, implying that they had inherited their titles. The Livonian Rhymed Chronicle describes him as the ruler of all Lithuania in 1236. His path to this title is not clear. Ruthenian chronicles mention that he murdered or expelled several dukes, including his relatives. Historian S.C. Rowell has described his rise to power as taking place through "the familiar processes of marriage, murder and military conquest." In Rowell's interpretation, Mindaugas recognized the advantage to Christianity in attracting foreign merchants and military support from the Teutonic Order. As a result, in 1251, he was baptized Catholic. The conversion was purely for political gain with Catholic Europe; Mindaugas was known to continue to sacrifice to his old gods after his "conversion." In order to consolidate his power, Mindaugas married into rival families, defeated some in battle, and exiled the rest of his rivals.

During the 1230s and 1240s, Mindaugas strengthened and established his power in various Baltic and Slavic lands. Warfare in the region intensified; he battled German forces in Kurland, while the Mongols destroyed Kiev in 1240 and entered Poland in 1241, defeating two Polish armies and burning Kraków. The Lithuanian victory in the Battle of Saule temporarily stabilized the northern front, but the Christian orders continued to make gains along the Baltic coast, founding the city of Klaipėda (Memel). Mindaugas established his residence in Navahrudak and succeededed in becoming master of the so-called Black Ruthenia on the upper Neman and its affluents with the cities of Hrodna, Vawkavysk, and Slonim, and also of the Principality of Polotsk. In about 1239 he appointed his son Vaišvilkas to govern these areas, then known as Black Ruthenia. In 1248, he sent his nephews Tautvilas and Edivydas, the sons of his brother Dausprungas, along with Vykintas, the Duke of Samogitia, to conquer Smolensk, but they were unsuccessful. His attempts to consolidate his rule in Lithuania met with mixed success; in 1249, an internal war erupted when he sought to seize his nephews' and Vykintas' lands.

== Path to coronation ==
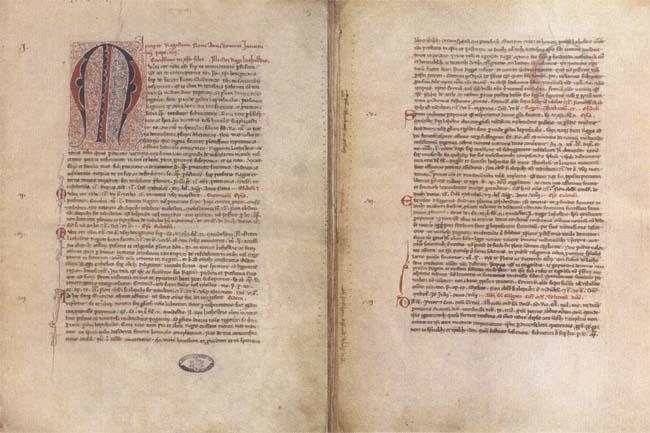
The Papal bull issued by Pope Innocent IV establishing Lithuania's placement under the jurisdiction of the Bishop of Rome, and discussing Mindaugas's baptism and coronation

Tautvilas, Edivydas, and Vykintas formed a powerful coalition in opposition to Mindaugas, along with the Samogitians of western Lithuania, the Livonian Order, Daniel of Galicia (Tautvilas and Edivydas's brother-in-law), and Vasilko of Volhynia. The princes of Galicia and Volhynia managed to gain control over Black Ruthenia, disrupting Vaišvilkas's supremacy. Tautvilas strengthened his position by traveling to Riga and accepting baptism by the Archbishop. In 1250, the Order organized a major raid through the lands of Nalšia into the domains of Mindaugas in Lithuania proper, and a raid into those parts of Samogitia that still supported him. Attacked from the north and south and facing the possibility of unrest elsewhere, Mindaugas was placed in an extremely difficult position, but managed to use the conflicts between the Livonian Order and the Archbishop of Riga to further his own interests. He succeeded in bribing Order Master Andreas von Stierland, who was still angry at Vykintas for the defeat at the Battle of Saule in 1236, by sending him "many gifts". In 1250 or 1251, Mindaugas agreed to receive baptism and relinquish control over some lands in western Lithuania, in return for Pope Innocent IV recognizing him as king. The pope welcomed a Christian Lithuania as a bulwark against Mongol threats; in turn, Mindaugas sought papal intervention in the ongoing Lithuanian conflicts with the Christian orders. On 17 July 1251, the pope signed two crucial papal bulls. One ordered the Bishop of Kulm (Chełmno) to crown Mindaugas as King of Lithuania, appoint a bishop for Lithuania, and build a cathedral. The other bull specified that the new bishop was to be directly subordinate to the Holy See, rather than to the Archbishop of Riga. The precise date of Mindaugas's baptism is not known. His wife, two sons, and members of his court were baptized; Pope Innocent wrote later that a multitude of Mindaugas's subjects also received Christianity.

The process of coronation and the establishment of Christian institutions took two years. Internal conflicts persisted; during the spring or summer of 1251, Tautvilas and his remaining allies attacked Mindaugas's warriors and the Livonian Order's crossbowmen in Voruta Castle. The attack failed, and Tautvilas's forces retreated to defend themselves in Tviremet Castle (presumed to be Tverai in Samogitia). Vykintas died in 1251 or 1252, and Tautvilas was forced to rejoin Daniel of Galicia.

== The Kingdom of Lithuania ==
Mindaugas's acts granting territories to the Livonian Order
Date	Territory
July 1253	Portions of Samogitia (half of Raseiniai, Betygala, Ariogala, and Laukuva – the other half went to Bishop Christian in March 1254), half of Dainava and Nadruva
October 1255	Selonia
1257	Karšuva, Nadruva, portions of Samogitia
7 August 1259	Portions of Dainava, all of Skalva and Samogitia
June 1260	All of Lithuania (if Mindaugas died without an heir)
7 August 1261	All of Selonia

Mindaugas and his wife Morta were crowned during the summer of 1253. Bishop Henry Heidenreich of Kulm presided over the ecclesiastical ceremonies and Master of the Livonian Order Andreas von Stirland conferred the crown. 6 July is now celebrated as Statehood Day (Lithuanian: Valstybės diena); it is an official holiday in modern Lithuania. The exact date of the coronation is not known; the scholarship of historian Edvardas Gudavičius, who promulgated this precise date, is sometimes challenged. The coronation ceremony supposedly took place in Navahrudak in the presence of many dignitaries, such as Bishop Heidenreich of Kulm, Livonian Master Andreas von Stierland and his brothers Andreas, Johannes the cupbearer, Sittherus the steward, and Theoderic of Hassendorp; from the Preaching Brothers (Dominicans), Brother Sinderamus; from the Minor Brothers (Franciscans), Brother Adolfus and his companions, and many others.

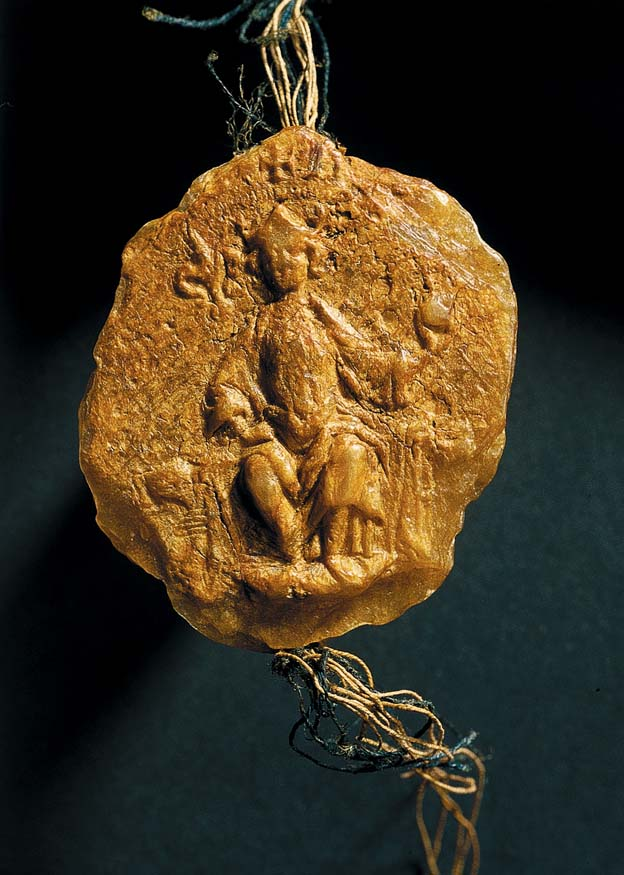
The Seal of Mindaugas, attached to the Act of October 1255, could be a medieval forgery by the Teutonic Knights

Relative peace and stability prevailed for about eight years. Mindaugas used this opportunity to concentrate on the expansion to the east, and to establish and organize state institutions. He strengthened his influence in Black Ruthenia, in Polatsk, a major center of commerce in the Daugava River basin, and in Pinsk. He also negotiated a peace with Galicia–Volhynia, and married his daughter to Svarn, the son of Daniel of Galicia, who would later become Grand Duke of Lithuania. Lithuanian relationships with western Europe and the Holy See were reinforced. In 1255, Mindaugas received permission from Pope Alexander IV to crown his son as King of Lithuania. A noble court, an administrative system, and a diplomatic service were initiated. Silver long coins, an index of statehood, were issued. He sponsored the construction of a cathedral in Vilnius, possibly on the site of today's Vilnius Cathedral.

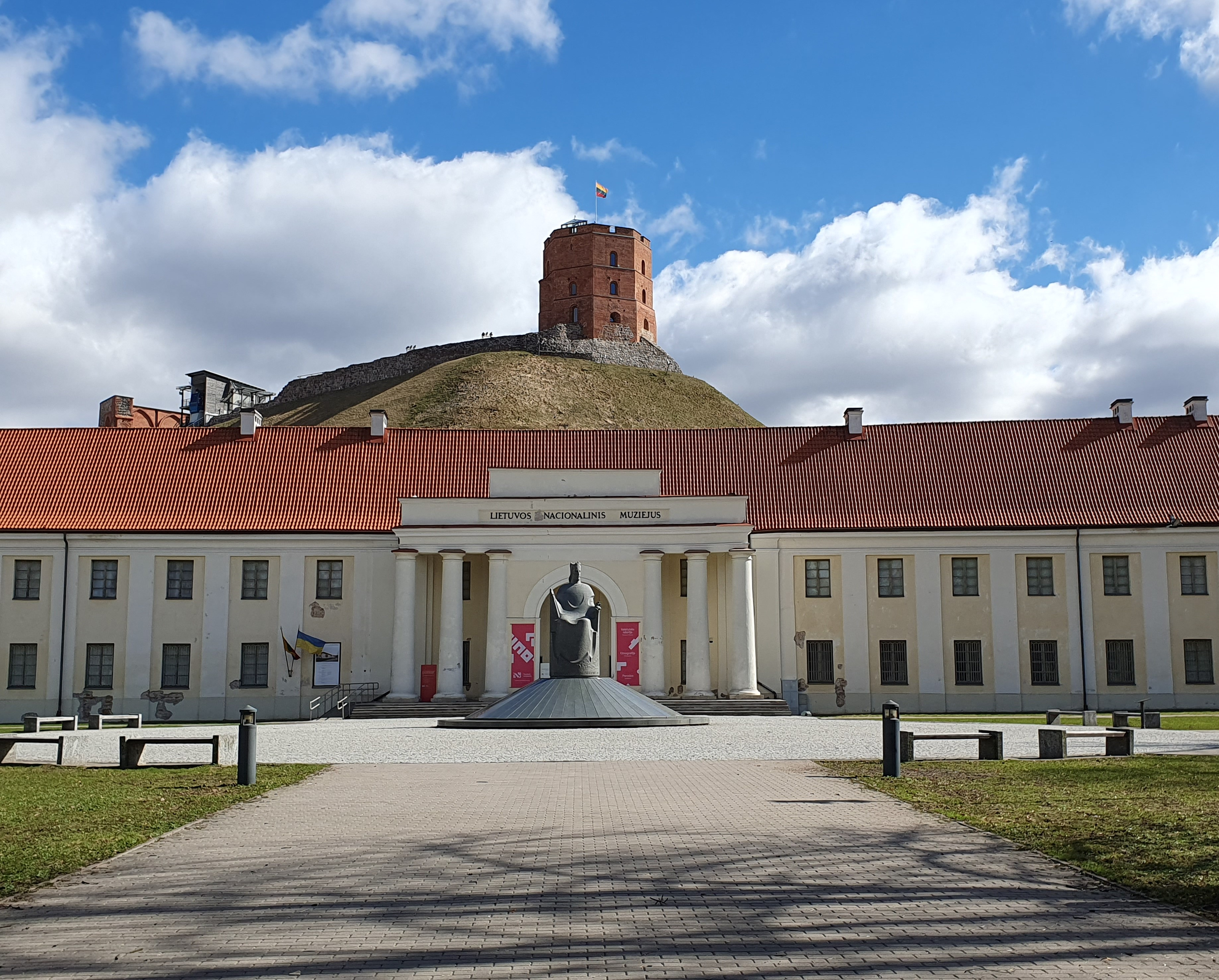
King Mindaugas Monument in front of the National Museum of Lithuania and Gediminas' Tower in Vilnius

Immediately after his coronation, Mindaugas transferred some lands to the Livonian Order – portions of Samogitia, Nadruva, and Dainava – although his control over these western lands was tenuous. There has been much discussion among historians as to whether in later years (1255–1261) Mindaugas gave even more lands to the order. The deeds might have been falsified by the order; the case for this scenario is bolstered by the fact that some of the documents mention lands that were not actually under the control of Mindaugas and by various irregularities in the treaty witnesses and seals.

Mindaugas and his antagonist Daniel reached a reconciliation in 1255; the Black Ruthenian lands were transferred to Roman, Daniel's son. Afterwards Mindaugas's son Vaišvilkas received baptism as a member of the Orthodox faith, becoming a monk and later founding a convent and monastery. Tautvilas's antagonism was temporarily resolved when he recognized Mindaugas's superiority and received Polatsk as a fiefdom. A direct confrontation with the Mongols occurred in 1258 or 1259, when Berke Khan sent his general Burundai to challenge Lithuanian rule, ordering Daniel and other regional princes to participate. The Novgorod Chronicle describes the following action as a defeat of the Lithuanians, but it has also been seen as a net gain for Mindaugas.

A single sentence in the Hypatian Chronicle mentions Mindaugas defending himself in Voruta against his nephews and Duke Vykintas; two other sources mention "his castle". The location of Voruta is not specified, and this has led to considerable speculation, along with archeological research, concerning the seat of his court. At least fourteen locations have been proposed, including Kernavė and Vilnius. The ongoing formal archeological digs at Kernavė began in 1979 after a portion of the site named "Mindaugas Throne hill-fort" collapsed. The town now hosts a major celebration on Statehood Day.

== Assassination and aftermath ==
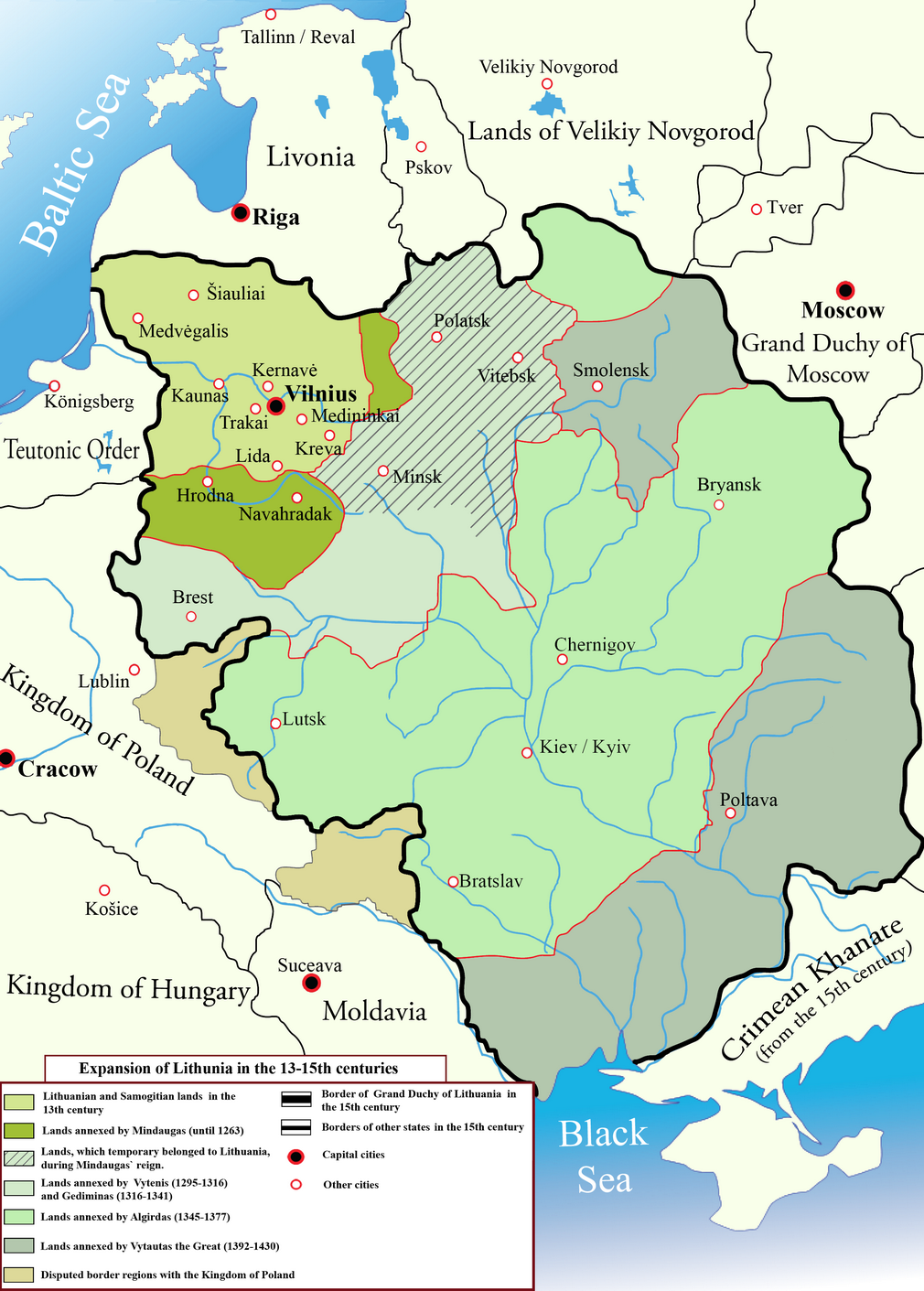
Expansion of the Grand Duchy of Lithuania between the 13th and 15th centuries

The Livonian Order used their alliance with Mindaugas to gain control over Samogitian lands. In 1252 he approved the Order's construction of Klaipeda Castle. Their governance, however, was seen as oppressive. Local merchants could only conduct transactions via Order-approved intermediaries; inheritance laws were changed; and the choices among marriage partners and residencies were restricted. Several pitched battles ensued. In 1259 the Order lost the Battle of Skuodas, and in 1260 it lost the Battle of Durbe. The first defeat encouraged a rebellion by the Semigalians, and the defeat at Durbe spurred the Prussians into the Great Prussian Rebellion, which lasted for 14 years. Encouraged by these developments and by his nephew Treniota, Mindaugas broke peace with the Order. The gains he had expected from Christianization had proven to be minor.

Mindaugas may have reverted to paganism afterwards. His motivation for conversion is often described by modern historians as merely strategic. The case for his apostasy rests largely on two near-contemporary sources: a 1324 assertion by Pope John XXII that Mindaugas had returned to error, and the Galician–Volhynian Chronicle. The chronicler writes that Mindaugas continued to practice paganism, making sacrifices to his gods, burning corpses, and conducting pagan rites in public. Historians have pointed to the possibility of bias in this account, since Mindaugas had been at war with Volhynia. Pope Clement IV, on the other hand, wrote in 1268 of "Mindaugas of happy memory" (clare memorie Mindota), expressing regret at his murder.

In any event, the Lithuanians were not prepared to accept Christianity, and Mindaugas's baptism had little impact on further developments. The majority of the population and the nobility remained pagan; his subjects were not required to convert. The cathedral he had built in Vilnius was superseded by a pagan temple, and all the diplomatic achievements made after his coronation were lost, although the practice of Christianity and intermarriage were well tolerated.

Regional conflicts with the Order escalated. Alexander Nevsky of Novgorod, Tautvilas, and Tautvilas's son Constantine agreed to form a coalition in opposition to Mindaugas, but their plans were unsuccessful. Treniota emerged as the leader of the Samogitian resistance; he led an army to Cēsis (now in Latvia), reaching the Estonian coast, and battled Masovia (now in Poland). His goal was to encourage all the conquered Baltic tribes to rise up against the Christian orders and unite under Lithuanian leadership. His personal influence grew while Mindaugas was concentrating on the conquest of Ruthenian lands, dispatching a large army to Bryansk. Treniota and Mindaugas began to pursue different priorities. The Rhymed Chronicle mentions Mindaugas's displeasure at the fact that Treniota did not create any alliances in Latvia or Estonia; he may have come to prefer diplomacy. In the midst of these events his wife Morta died, and Mindaugas took her sister as his new wife. The only problem was that the sister was already married to Daumantas. In retaliation, Daumantas and Treniota assassinated Mindaugas and two of his sons in fall 1263. According to a late medieval tradition, the assassination took place in Aglona. He was buried along with his horses, in accordance with ancestral tradition. After Mindaugas's death, Lithuania lapsed into internal disorder. Three of his successors – Treniota, his son-in-law Svarn, and his son Vaišvilkas – were assassinated during the next seven years. Stability did not return until the reign of Traidenis, designated Grand Duke c. 1270.

== Legacy ==
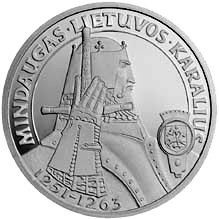
Litas Commemorative coin dedicated to King Mindaugas, with the inscription Mindaugas King of Lithuania

Mindaugas held a dubious position in Lithuanian historiography until the Lithuanian national revival of the 19th century. While pagan sympathizers held him in disregard for betraying his religion, Christians saw his support as lukewarm. He received only passing references from Grand Duke Gediminas and was not mentioned at all by Vytautas the Great. His known family relations end with his children; no historic records note any connections between his descendants and the Gediminids dynasty that ruled Lithuania and Poland until 1572. A 17th-century rector of Vilnius University held him responsible for the troubles then being experienced by the Polish–Lithuanian Commonwealth ("the seed of internal discord among the Lithuanians had been sown".) A 20th-century historian charged him with the "destruction of the organization of the Lithuanian state". The first academic study of his life by a Lithuanian scholar (Jonas Totoraitis' Die Litauer unter dem König Mindowe bis zum Jahre 1263) was not published until 1905. In the 1990s historian Edvardas Gudavičius published his findings pinpointing a coronation date, which became a national holiday. The 750th anniversary of his coronation was marked in 2003 by the dedication of the Mindaugas Bridge in Vilnius, numerous festivals and concerts, and visits from other heads of state. In Belarus, there is the legendary Mindaugas's Hill in Navahrudak, mentioned by Adam Mickiewicz in his 1828 poem Konrad Wallenrod. A memorial stone on the Mindaugas's hill was installed in 1993 and a metal sculpture of Mindaugas in 2014.

Mindaugas is the primary subject of the 1829 drama Mindowe, by Juliusz Słowacki, one of the Three Bards. He has been portrayed in several 20th-century literary works: the Latvian author Mārtiņš Zīverts' tragedy Vara (Power, 1944), Justinas Marcinkevičius' drama-poem Mindaugas (1968), Romualdas Granauskas' Jaučio aukojimas (The Offering of the Bull, 1975), and Juozas Kralikauskas' Mindaugas (1995). Coronation of Mindaugas and creation of the Grand Duchy is the main topic of the 2002 Belarusian novel Alhierd's Lance by Volha Ipatava dedicated to the 750th anniversary of the coronation.

== See also ==
- History of Lithuania (1219–1295)
- List of rulers of Lithuania
- Early dukes of Lithuania

== Notes ==
Mindaugas House of Mindaugas Born: c. 1203 Died: 1263
New title Mindaugas's consolidation of power	Ruler of Lithuania; Grand Duke: 1236–1251, King: 1251–1263; 1236–1263	Succeeded by Treniota as Grand Duke
