= Hagen (Samtgemeinde) =

- Samtgemeinde
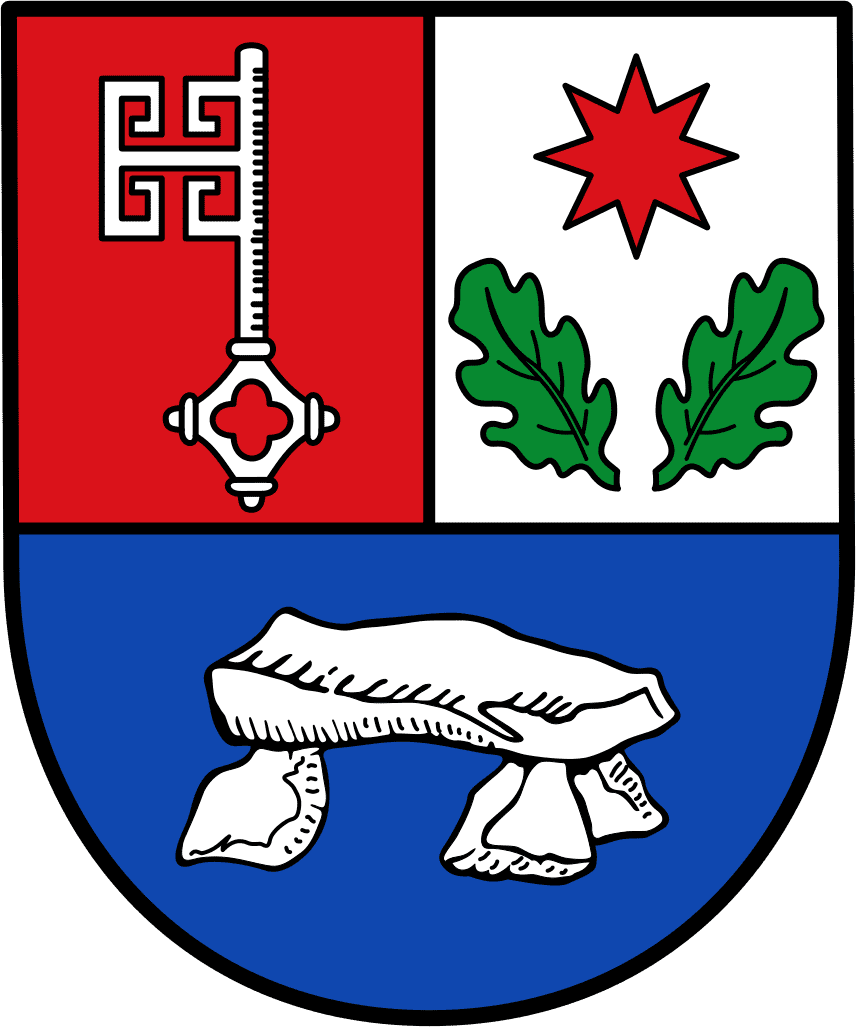
- Coat of arms

- Location of Hagen within Cuxhaven district
- Interactive map of Hagen
- Location within Germany Location within Lower Saxony
- Coordinates: 53°22′N 8°39′E
- Country: Germany
- State: Lower Saxony
- District: Cuxhaven
- Founded: 1970-01-01
- Disbanded: 2014-01-01
- Subdivisions: 6

Area
  - Total: 197.32 km^{2} (76.19 sq mi)

Population (2012-12-31)
  - Total: 10,991
  - Density: 55.701/km^{2} (144.27/sq mi)
- Time zone: UTC+01:00 (CET)
  - Summer (DST): UTC+02:00 (CEST)
- Website: www.hagen-cux.de

Hagen is a former Samtgemeinde ("collective municipality") in the district of Cuxhaven, in Lower Saxony, Germany. Its seat was in Hagen im Bremischen. It was disbanded on 1 January 2014.

The Samtgemeinde Hagen consisted of the following municipalities:

1. Bramstedt
2. Driftsethe
3. Hagen im Bremischen
4. Sandstedt
5. Uthlede
6. Wulsbüttel
