= Toll (fee) =

Fee charged for use of a road

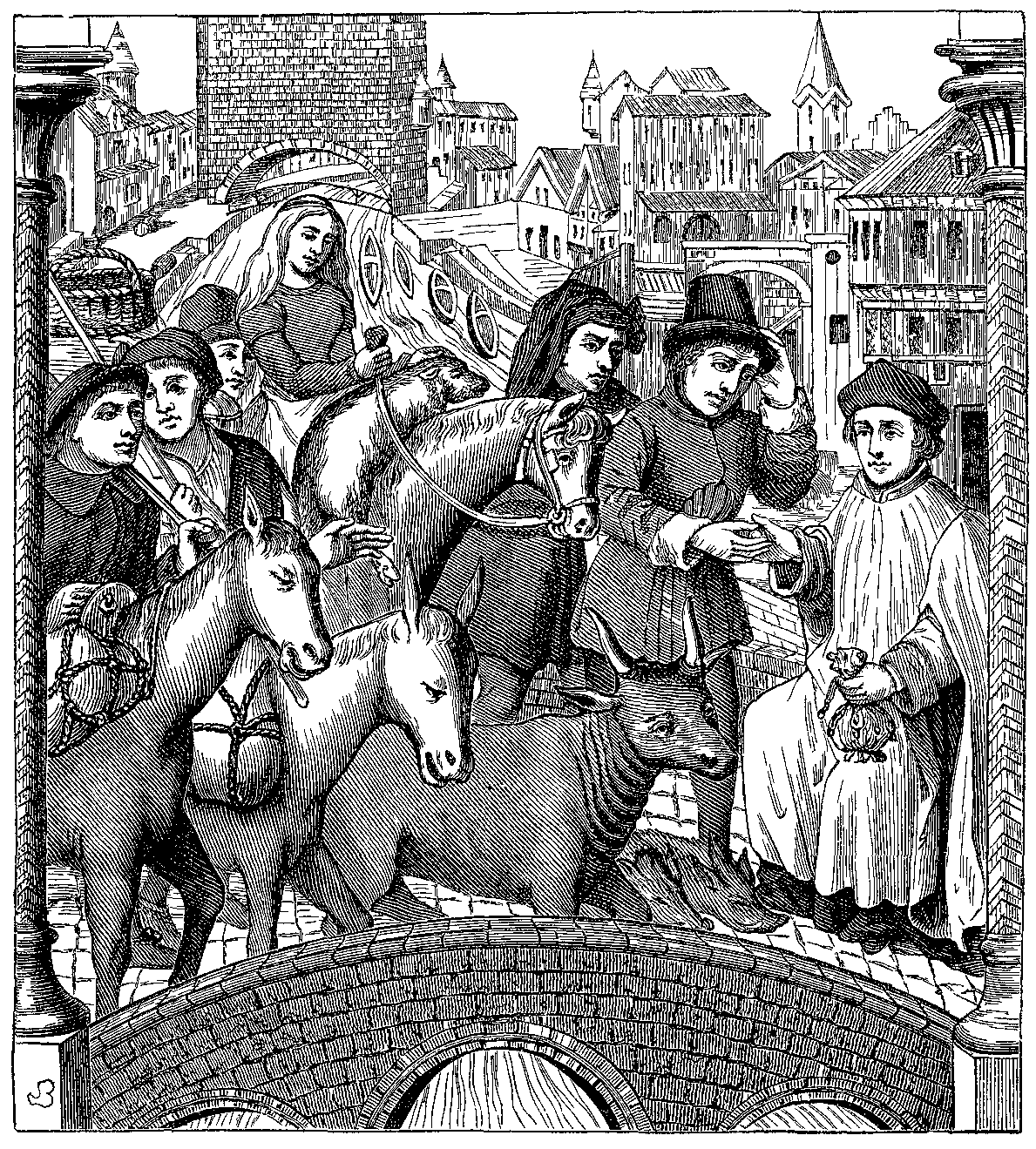
15th century illustration of a toll payment being made to cross a bridge

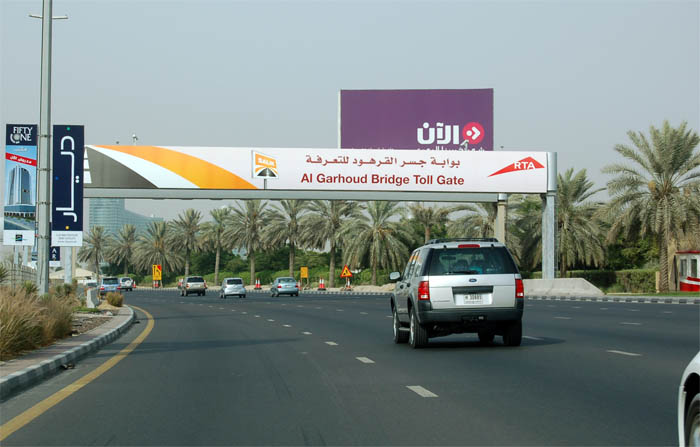
Tolls in the UAE

A toll is a fee charged for the use of a road or waterway.

== History ==
Tolls usually had to be paid at strategic locations such as bridges (sometimes called a bridge toll) or gates. In Europe, the road toll goes back to the practice of the Germanic tribes, who charged fees to travellers if they wanted to cross over mountain passages. From that time, road tolls became commonplace in medieval times, especially in the Holy Roman Empire. The Empire had a "passage system" whereby a number of toll stations would be established on a route where small tolls were collected. Examples were the Ochsenweg in Schleswig-Holstein which had toll stations at Königsau and Rendsburg, Neumünster, Bramstedt and Ulzburg, as well as the Gabler Road with the Karlsfried Castle as its toll station. Another form of road tax was Liniengeld, which had to be paid when entering the city of Vienna from the beginning of the 18th century.

A special form of road toll was the Pflasterzoll, which had to be paid to fund the initial cobbling of a road and its subsequent upkeep.

== Electronic collection ==
Electronic toll collection is a wireless system to automatically collect the usage fee or toll charged to vehicles using toll roads, HOV lanes, toll bridges, and toll tunnels. It is a faster alternative to toll booths, where vehicles must stop and the driver manually pays the toll with cash or a card. In most systems, vehicles using the system are equipped with an automated radio transponder device. When the vehicle passes a roadside toll reader device, a radio signal from the reader triggers the transponder, which transmits back an identifying number which registers the vehicle's use of the road, and an electronic payment system charges the user the toll. A major advantage is the driver does not have to stop, reducing traffic delays. Electronic tolling is cheaper than a staffed toll booth, reducing transaction costs for government or private road owners. The ease of varying the amount of the toll makes it easy to implement road congestion pricing, including for high-occupancy lanes, toll lanes that bypass congestion, and city-wide congestion charges. The payment system usually requires users to sign up in advance and load money into a declining-balance account, which is debited each time they pass a toll point.

== Bibliography ==
- Button, Kenneth J. (2010). Transport Economics 3rd Edition. Edward Elgar Publishing, Cheltenham, UK. ISBN 978-1-84064-191-2. (See Chapter 9: Optimizing Traffic Congestion)
- Santos, Georgina, ed. (2004). Road Pricing, Volume 9: Theory and Evidence (Research in Transportation Economics). JAI Press. ISBN 978-0762309689.
- Schade, Jens; Schlag, Bernhard, eds. (2003). Acceptability of Transport Pricing Strategies. Emerald Group Publishing, Bingley, West Yorkshire. ISBN 978-0080441993.
- Small, Kenneth A.; Verhoef, Erik T. (2007). The Economics of Urban Transportation. Routledge, New York. ISBN 978-0-415-28515-5. (See Chapter 4: Pricing)
- Smeed, R.J. (1964). Road pricing: the economic and technical possibilities. HMSO.
- Verhoef, Erik T.; Bliemer, Michiel; Steg, Linda; Van Wee, Bert, eds. (2008). Pricing in Road Transport: A Multi-Disciplinary Perspective. Edward Elgar Publishing, Cheltenham, UK. ISBN 978-1845428600.
- Walters, A. A. (1968). The Economics of Road User Charges. World Bank Staff Occasional Papers Number Five, Washington, D.C. ISBN 978-0-8018-0653-7.

== See also ==
- Shadow toll, payments made by government to the private sector operator of a road based on the number of vehicles using the road
- Toll castle, a castle guarding a customs post, in the Middle Ages and the Early Modern Era
- Toll point, a place on a canal where a fee was collected
