= Imanta (disambiguation) =

Imanta is a neighbourhood in Riga, Latvia.

Imanta may also refer to:

- The female version of the Latvian masculine given name Imants
- Imanta Station, a railway station in the Riga neighbourhood
- Latvian minehunter Imanta, a naval vessel built in 1984

== See also ==
- Imana (disambiguation)
- Emin Minaret, whose Hanyu Pinyin transcription is É'mǐn Tǎ
