= Road toll (historical) =

The road toll was a historical fee charged to travellers and merchants in return for permission to use the roads and waterways of the country or state concerned. It was reinforced in the Holy Roman Empire by the law of Straßenzwang which meant that traders in certain goods had to use specified roads. In return, they were usually guaranteed safe passage under the right of escort or Geleitrecht. The road toll was widespread especially in medieval times, and, in addition to the payments from the staple rights, was an important source of income.

== History ==
Road tolls usually had to be paid at strategic locations such as bridges (sometimes called a bridge toll) or gates. In Europe, the road toll goes back to the practice of the Germanic tribes, who charged fees to travellers if they wanted to cross over mountain passages. From that time, road tolls became commonplace in medieval times, especially in the Holy Roman Empire. The Empire had a "passage system" whereby a number of toll stations would be established on a route where small tolls were collected. Examples were the Ochsenweg in Schleswig-Holstein which had toll stations at Königsau and Rendsburg, Neumünster, Bramstedt and Ulzburg, as well as the Gabler Road with the Karlsfried Castle as its toll station. Another form of road tax was Liniengeld, which had to be paid when entering the city of Vienna from the beginning of the 18th century.

A special form of road toll was the Pflasterzoll, which had to be paid to fund the initial cobbling of a road and its subsequent upkeep.

== River toll ==
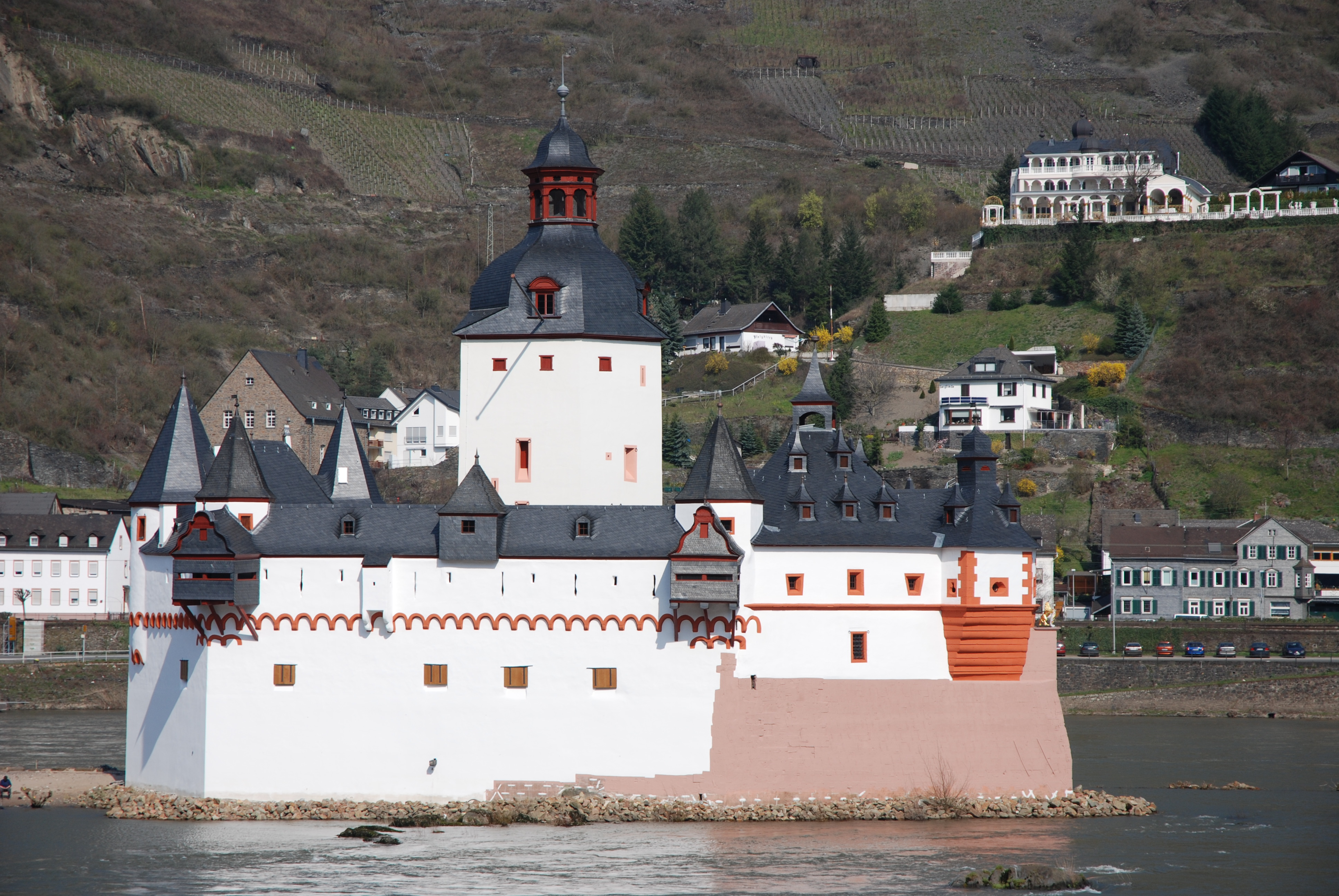
Pfalzgrafenstein Castle in the Rhine near Kaub

Another form of toll on medieval travel was the river toll that was raised for the use of a waterway. Outside the towns themselves, toll stations were established in some cases at special locations; for example, Loevestein Castle in the Netherlands was built at a strategic point on the confluence of two rivers. Ships and boats had to pay a river toll here in order to proceed down the river.

The Kingdom of Denmark had Kronborg Castle built from the receipts of the Sound Toll, a toll on ships for using the Sound of Denmark.

In a document at the imperial castle of Cochem dated 17 March 1130, which Count Palatine William of Ballenstedt had made out, mention was made of the usual river toll charged on the Moselle at one of its toll stations. The building also had the status of a toll castle. By contrast, the castle of Pfalzgrafenstein Castle in the Rhine near Kaub was exclusively used to collect river tolls. Another well known toll site on the Rhine was the imperial palace of Kaiserswerth built in 1174, while the toll station at Stolzenfels Castle was also well positioned between Koblenz and Frankfurt.

=== In mythology ===
In Greek mythology the ferryman, Charon, charged the dead a river toll of one obolus for transporting them over the Acheron (also called the Lethe or Styx) so that they were able to enter the Underworld or Hades. This was called Charon’s obul. Coins were placed either in the mouth or on the eyes of the dead. This practice gave the mourning relatives peace of mind knowing their loved ones would be able to cross safely into the afterlife.

== Extortion ==
In the Middle Ages, road tolls were occasionally demanded from towns, monasteries, castles and villages by roaming armed bands; in return for which they would waive their use of force. This was especially true of the Normans and Vikings, but also of large bands of robbers. This type of payment was also referred to as Danegeld (payment to Danish warriors). In England, it is estimated that 30,000 pounds of silver were paid in the 9th century as Danegeld.

== See also ==
- Robber baron (feudalism)
- Toll road
