= Gürtel =

Gürtel may refer to:

- Gürtel, Vienna, a ring road in Vienna, Austria
- Gürtel case, a political corruption case of Spain
