= Berthold of Hanover =

German bishop (fl. 12th century)

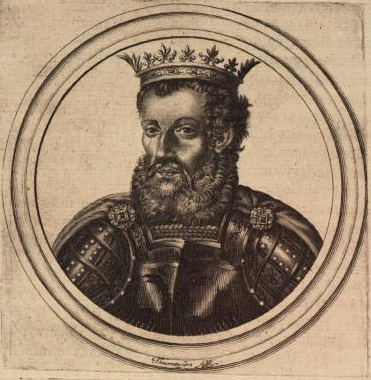
Berthold of Hanover, was a German Cistercian and Bishop of Livonia

Berthold of Hanover (died 24 July 1198) was a German Cistercian and Bishop of Livonia, who met his death in a crusade against the pagan Livonians.

== Life ==
He was abbot of the Cistercian Loccum Abbey in Hanover. At the death of Saint Meinhard, the first Bishop of Livonia (c. 1196), Hartwig of Uthlede, Archbishop of Bremen, to whose province belonged the newly converted countries along the eastern shores of the Baltic Sea, appointed Abbot Berthold successor. Damberger asserts that when Meinhard came to Bremen in 1186 to obtain help with his mission in Livonia, Berthold joined the band of missionaries who accompanied him there.

The Livonian pagans were fanatically opposed to Christianity. Berthold's predecessor, assisted by merchants from Bremen and Lübeck and a few converts, had built fortifications along the River Düna, where Christians held their religious services and could protect themselves. Following in the footsteps of his predecessor, Berthold tried to gain confidence and good will by kindness. At first the pagans appeared to become less hostile, but soon their old hatred revived. When Berthold attempted to bless the Christian cemetery at Holm, they decided either to burn the bishop together with his church at Holm or to drown him in the Düna. The Christians fled to their strongholds at Üxküll and Holm, while the bishop escaped in a ship to Lübeck.

Pope Celestine III, shortly before his death, was preparing to send a fleet of crusaders to protect the Christians of the Baltic Provinces, and his successor, Pope Innocent III, continued the work. Berthold gained the financial assistance of Archbishop Hartwig and many merchants of Bremen and Lübeck. In a short time a large fleet was ready for departure, well equipped and loaded with crusaders and many German peasants who were to settle permanently in Livonia. It put to sea at Lübeck and crossed the Baltic, entering the River Düna from what is now called the Gulf of Riga. Near the mouth of the Düna the German peasants landed with the purpose of making their homes in the vicinity, and laid the foundations of the city Riga. Berthold, accompanied by the crusaders, sailed up the river as far as Holm, where the Livonians had gathered with the intention of attacking the fleet.

Having failed to come to a peaceful agreement with them, Berthold and his companions sailed some distance down the river, with the Livonians in pursuit. The pagans agreed to a truce, to gain time, but they attacked the Christians who ventured outside their fortifications, and hostilities were resumed. The crusaders were victorious, but Berthold's horse became intractable and galloped into the midst of the fleeing Livonians. A pagan by the name of Ymaut (wrongly read as Ymant) thrust his lance into Berthold's back, inflicting a wound that caused speedy death.

The bishop's body was buried by the crusaders at Üxküll, and was later transferred to Riga by Albert of Riga, whom Archbishop Hartwig of Bremen had appointed Berthold's successor. After the death of Berthold some of the conquered pagans asked to be baptized. The final conversion of Livonia was effected by Bishop Albert, who was assisted in by the newly founded Order of the Brothers of the Sword, which in 1237 was affiliated with the Teutonic Order.

== See also ==
- Chronicle of Henry of Livonia

Catholic Church titles
Preceded by Meinhard	Bishop of Livonia; 1196–1198	Succeeded by Albert
