= Saint Meinhard =

German Augustinian canon regular and the first Bishop of Livonia

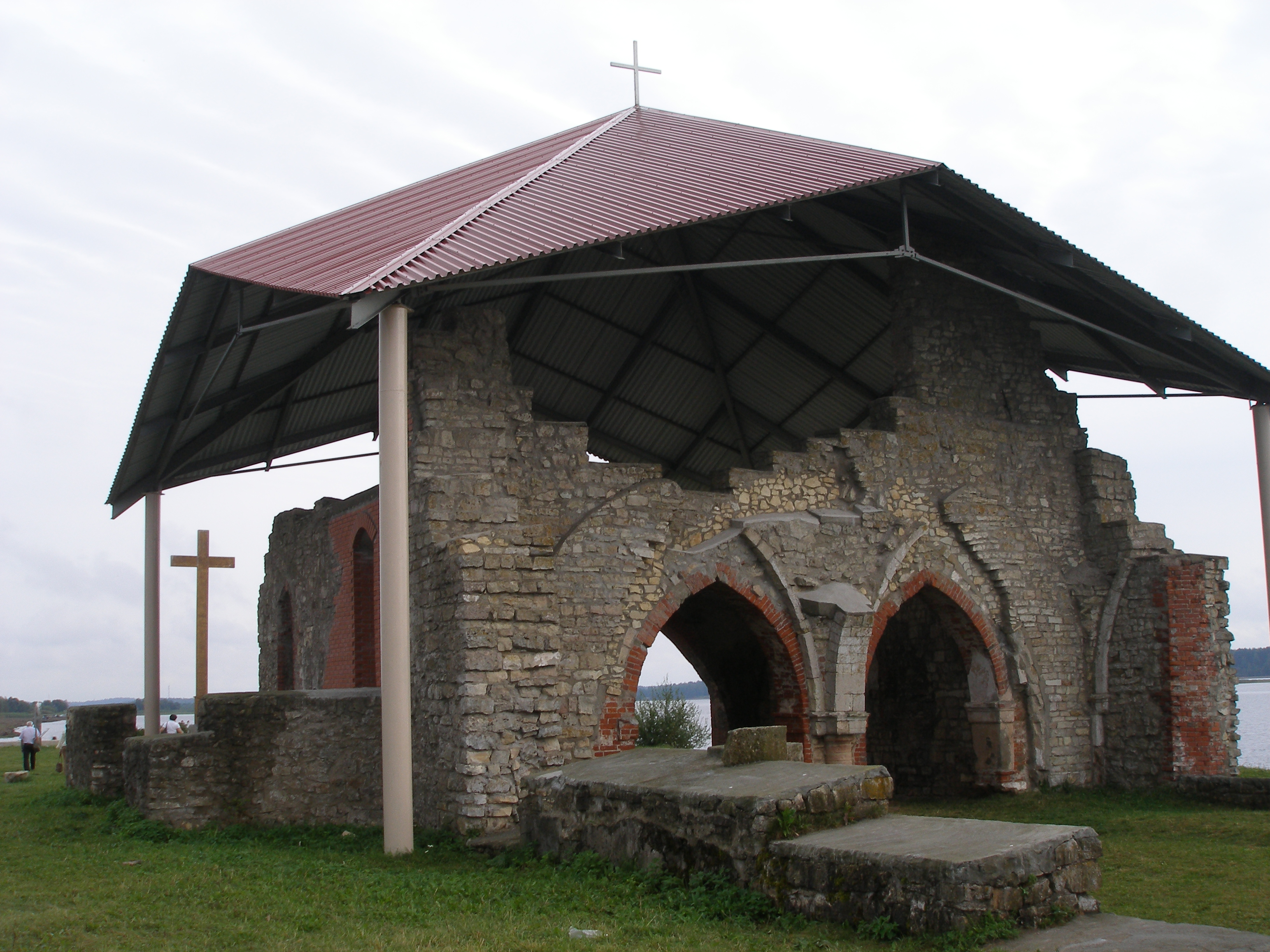
- Remains of the church built by Saint Meinhard in present-day Latvia

Apostle of the Church in Latvia and Livonia
- Born: 1134 or 1136
- Died: 1196
- Venerated in: Catholic Church
- Feast: 14 August

Saint Meinhard (1134 or 1136 – August 14 or October 11, 1196) was a German Augustinian canon regular and the first bishop of Livonia. His life was described in the Livonian Chronicle of Henry. His body rests in the now-Lutheran Riga Cathedral, as his remains were moved to Riga in 1226. He is venerated as the apostle of the Church in Latvia (Livonia in the Middle Ages).

== Life ==
As a canon at the Segeberg Abbey in Holstein, Meinhard was possibly inspired by Vicelinus missionary work among the Slavs. Meinhard traveled with Lübeck merchants, probably trading costly furs, to Livonia on a Catholic mission in the 1170s or early 1180s to convert pagan Semigallians, Latgalians, and Livonians into Christianity. He settled on the Daugava River at Ikšķile (German: Üxküll) southeast of where today is Riga. In 1184, he built a stone church, dedicated to Our Lady.

Following an attack by the Lithuanians, Meinhard brought stonemasons from Gotland to build a fortress to defend against future attacks from raiders from Lithuania looking to carry off slaves. These were the first known stone buildings among the Baltic tribes. Remains of the church survive to this day. With the construction of the Riga Hydroelectric Power Plant in the 1970s, an artificial island was erected to prevent water from flooding the ruins. For conservation the ruins were covered with metal in 2002.

Another stone castle was built in Salaspils (German: Holm) as a gift to newly converted pagans. But the inhabitants rebelled and attacked Meinhard attempting to drive him out of Livonia.

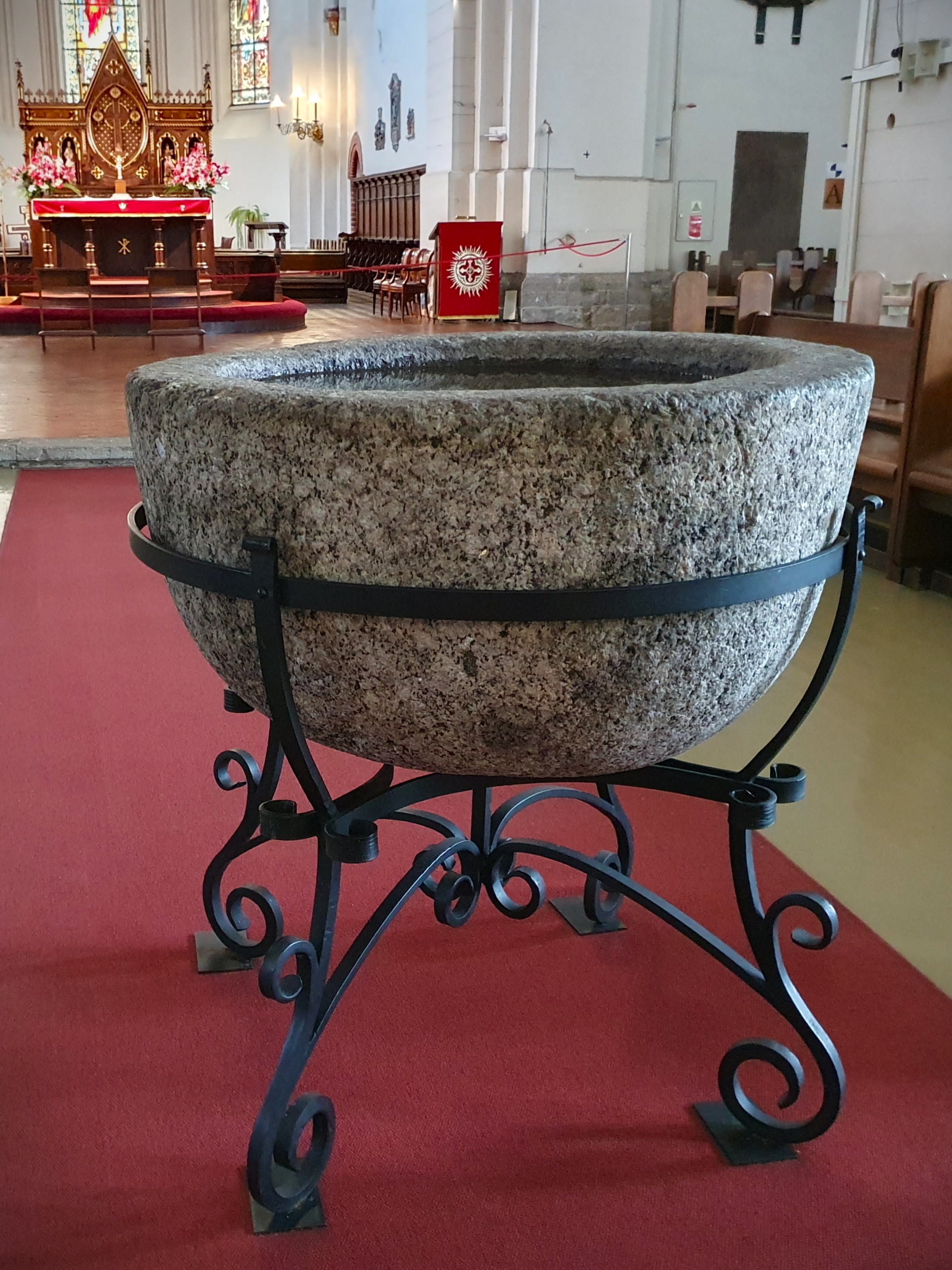
Baptismal font of Saint Meinhard (Riga, 2023)

When he briefly returned to Germany in 1186, Meinhard was consecrated as Bishop of Üxküll (present-day Ikšķile, Latvia) by Hartwig of Uthlede, Archbishop of Bremen. The new bishopric was confirmed by Pope Clement III in September 1188. In 1190, Clement III allowed any monk to join Meinhard's mission. New Pope Celestine III showed more enthusiastic support for the mission in his letter in April 1193, authorizing active missionary recruitment, making exceptions to rules governing monks' food and clothing, and granting indulgences to those who joined the mission. Among the recruits was Theodorich from Loccum Abbey, who started a mission in Turaida (German: Treyden). Meinhard initially converted the pagans by peaceful means, but faced with resistance and apostasy, he turned to the idea of a crusade.

Meinhard was succeeded by Berthold of Hanover and Albert of Riga, who began the Livonian Crusade and established the Livonian Brothers of the Sword, a crusading military order, in Riga.

On 8 September 1993, then Pope John Paul II during a visit to the Baltic states solemnly proclaimed that he would formally restore the veneration of Saint Meinhard on 14 August each year, in a papal act considered equivalent to canonization.

Catholic Church titles
Preceded by none	Bishop of Livonia; 1186–1196	Succeeded by Berthold
