= Liniengeld =

Road tell to enter Vienna, Austria

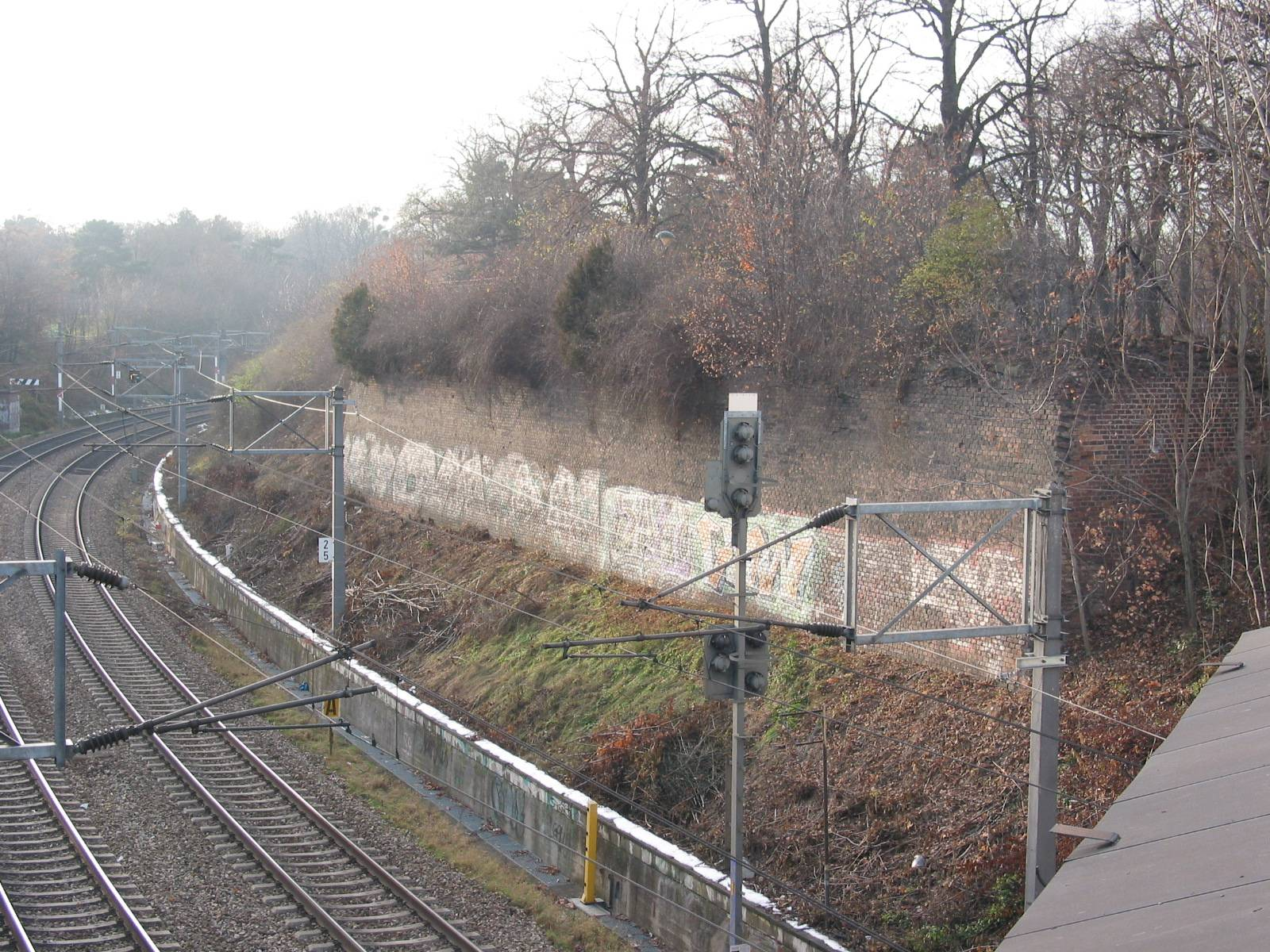
One of the last remaining sections of the Linienwall by the Vienna S-Bahn near Landstraßer Gürtel

The Liniengeld was a historic road toll that had to be paid on entering the city of Vienna in Austria from the 18th century.

== Term ==
The Linienwall ("line(s) rampart") was built in the early 18th century as a simple fortification line around the outskirts of Vienna to protect the city from invading Turks and other raiders. On crossing the "line" (Linien) a toll, the Liniengeld had to be paid for each horse and wagon. This fee was charged each time someone entered the city which led to merchants and chamberlains, for example, both inside and outside the city boundaries, protesting that they had to pay the toll several times a day.

The historian, Leopold von Ranke, described the Liniengeld in his magazine, Historisch-politische Zeitschrift, as a "very important" source of income for the city of Vienna.

== Literature ==
- Johann Georg Krünitz, Oeconomische Encyclopädie (in German), vol. Band 79, pp. 325 f.
- Leopold von Ranke (1833–1836), Historisch-politische Zeitschrift (in German), vol. Band 2, Berlin: Verlag Duncker & Humblot, p. 703
- Friedrich Nicolai (1796), Beschreibung einer Reise durch Deutschland und die Schweiz im Jahre 1781 (in German), vol. Band 11, Berlin und Stettin, p. 88
