= Wedel =

- Town
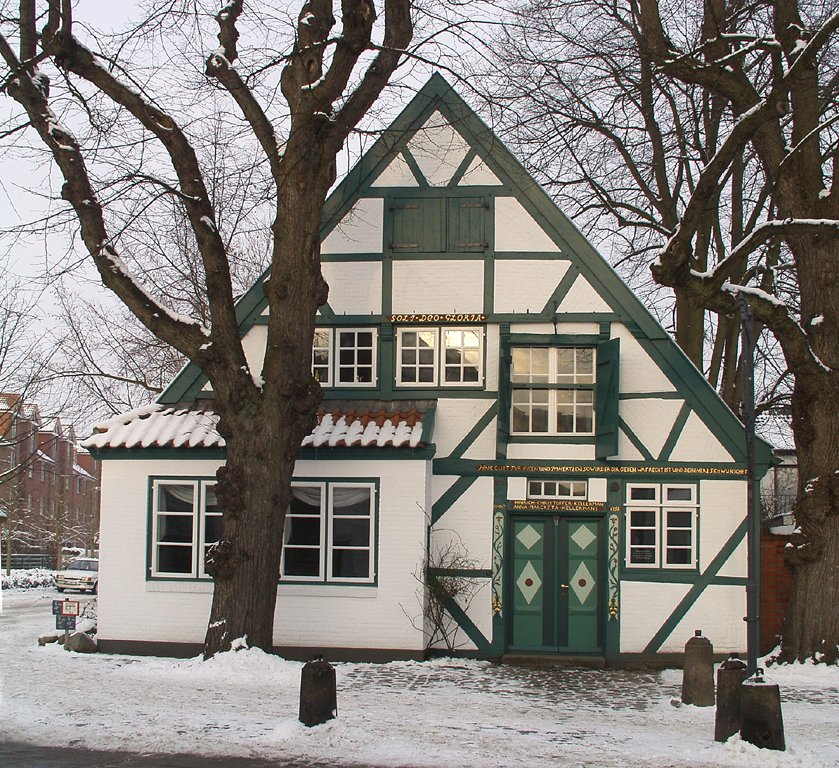
- Reepschlägerhaus

- Flag Coat of arms

- Location of Wedel within Pinneberg district
- Interactive map of Wedel
- Location within Germany Location within Schleswig-Holstein
- Coordinates: 53°35′N 9°42′E
- Country: Germany
- State: Schleswig-Holstein
- District: Pinneberg

Government
  - Mayor: Niels Schmidt (Ind.)

Area
  - Total: 33.81 km^{2} (13.05 sq mi)
- Elevation: 8 m (26 ft)

Population (2025-12-31)
  - Total: 34,939
  - Density: 1,033/km^{2} (2,676/sq mi)
- Time zone: UTC+01:00 (CET)
  - Summer (DST): UTC+02:00 (CEST)
- Postal codes: 22880
- Dialling codes: 04103
- Vehicle registration: PI
- Website: www.wedel.de

Wedel (German pronunciation: [ˈveːdl̩]) is a town in the district of Pinneberg, in Schleswig-Holstein, in northern Germany. It is situated on the right bank of the Elbe, approximately 20 kilometres (12 mi) south of Elmshorn, and 17 kilometres (11 mi) west of Hamburg.

== History ==
=== Foundation and Middle Ages ===
The first known mention of Wedel in a text is in a 1212 document naming the "brothers from Wedel" as witnesses. However, the mention is not definitive and it remains unclear whether a place of this name already existed elsewhere. Artifacts of pre- and early historical periods found here bear witness to early settlement at the site.

The name means "bank of water", identifying a place where a body of water must be crossed, in this case the "Wedeler Aue", a small brook which formed an obstacle on an important local trade route. The first clear and definitive reference to Wedel is in documents of the Count of Schauenburg, a member of the Lower Saxon aristocracy that ruled the area well into the 17th century. The castle of the Schauenburgs, built in 1311 and known as the Hatzburg, was located in Holm which is today a small village close to Wedel. That same year Adolf VI, Count of Schauenburg and Holstein-Pinneberg signed a peace treaty in which he promised the rulers of the city of Hamburg that there would be no harm coming from the Hatzburg. As the years went by the importance of the castle decreased and it fell into decay. The Schauenburgs moved later that century to the nearby city of Pinneberg. The castle itself stood until the beginning of the 18th century. Documents available from the first half of the 14th century make mention of a mill and church in Wedel.

=== Ox trade ===
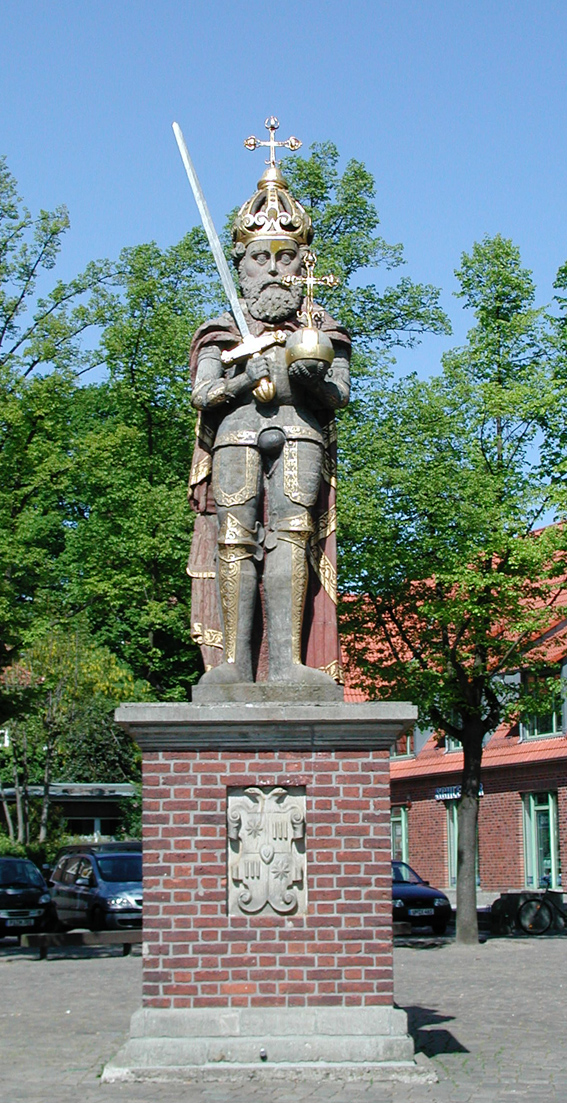
Roland statue

The ox market in Wedel developed into one of the most important marketplaces for cattle in northern Germany. Cattle dealers drove large trucks from all over Jutland to sell their livestock (especially oxen) here and their trade route became known as the Oxen Way. Early armies took advantage of the easy route carved by the merchants, and so it came to also be known as the Army Way.

The Roland statue of Wedel is a well known local monument which stands in the town marketplace. The figure of Roland became popular in many parts of Germany as a symbol of the growing independence of cities from the nobility. In Wedel, Roland symbolized justice in the market and it was traditional to hold sales negotiations or settle disputes under his watchful eye. The first Roland erected here around 1450 was probably a simple wooden statue. The Roland standing in the town today is believed to have been raised in 1558 after being commissioned by Count Otto IV of Schauenburg and Holstein-Pinneberg and is made of Bückeburg sandstone.

The principal trading area of the ox market was located just before the crossing of the River Elbe. The livestock were sold to buyers arriving from the west, as well as to dealers from Flanders. Up to 30,000 head of cattle would be traded in a springtime market that lasted several weeks. Wedel saw considerable conflict throughout the 17th century and the decline of the oxen trade began with the outbreak of the Thirty Years' War (1618–1648). The region was devastated by war and life was made difficult for the inhabitants of the region due to constant assault from outside. Detailed descriptions of the wartorn period are found in the writings of the poet, clergyman, and theologian Johann von Rist who was born in 1607 in Ottensen, today a suburb of Hamburg.

The well-educated theologian became pastor of the local church in 1635. In Wedel he found a place to resume his studies and to continue his contacts with prominent poets and scholars of the time. He wrote numerous works on common and religious themes, including poetry, plays, sermons, and essays about society and literature. Many of these were critical works that opposed the wars. Working with other prominent German poets of the time he helped create the Elbschwanenorden, a group that worked to maintain the integrity of the German language. On his passing in 1667 he left a significant literary legacy.

=== From Danish rule to Germany ===
The last Schauenburger, Count Ernst, died in 1622 leaving rule of the region to the Danish King Christian IV. The 17th and 18th centuries here were marked by epidemics, devastating fires, and warfare. The plague struck the area several times and Wedel was razed by fire more than once.

In 1848, the large German population of Schleswig-Holstein, including Wedel, rebelled against Danish rule with the objective of joining the emerging German federation. In 1864, Prussian and Austrian troops invaded the region ending over two centuries of Danish rule.

The community flourished seeing the selection of a mayor, the establishment of schools, industrialization and the renewal of trade. The Johann Diedrich Moeller Company optics company (today Möller-Wedel International) was formed in 1864 and developed a specialization in ophthalmology and surgical microscopes. Trade in beer and Branntwein (distillates of wine) also flourished, and a tree nursery was established. In 1875, the town council requested the status of city for Wedel, which had a population of 1,669.

Industrialization continued in the region with the construction of a short-lived gunpowder factory in neighboring Schulau in 1877 that exploded and burned a year later. The construction of a rail link in 1883 contributed to the development of a sugar processing factory and the German Vacuum Company. The population grew steadily and a community of immigrant workers, primarily from Poland, developed. The young city grew culturally as well with the establishment of a public library and museum after the turn of the century.

=== Into the 20th century ===
By 1909 Wedel and Schulau had grown into one another and Schulau was amalgamated into Wedel. Development continued with the construction of a power plant and in 1930 a hospital was built. Like the rest of the country, the city was hard hit by the Depression. Several large firms collapsed: the sugar processor let go nearly 400 workers and overall unemployment was high with over 20 percent of the population living on public support.

This impacted the political life in Wedel. From 1929 the number of political meetings rose significantly. With public marches and mass meetings in particular the extreme parties determined the political scenery in the town. It came often to violent incidents. Then the Nazis took power in Wedel as they did over the entire Germany. Important administrative posts were occupied by the Nazis. The labor parties SPD and the KPD in Wedel, quite strongly represented before the Nazis came, were forbidden and went temporarily into the resistance. Many of their members were arrested and spent years in concentration camps.

In the 1930s the most important structural change of the townscape was the new building of the city hall in the Bahnhofstrasse, the housing developments at the Vosshagen, the Nordschleswig settlement and the Milich Settlement.

In 1939 Wedel honored its third honorary citizen. After the first honorary citizen, a mayor of many years and the second one a publicly engaged physician for the poor this honor was given to Rudolf Hoeckner a painter well known even outside the realms of Wedel.

At the same time people of Wedel wanted to attach a plaque to the birth house of another famous Wedel Burger. But to honor Ernst Barlach was not desired at this time because of the Nazi regime.

=== World War II ===
In March 1943 a Royal Air Force bomber attack nearly reduced the town to ruins as nearly 70% of homes in Wedel were damaged or destroyed.

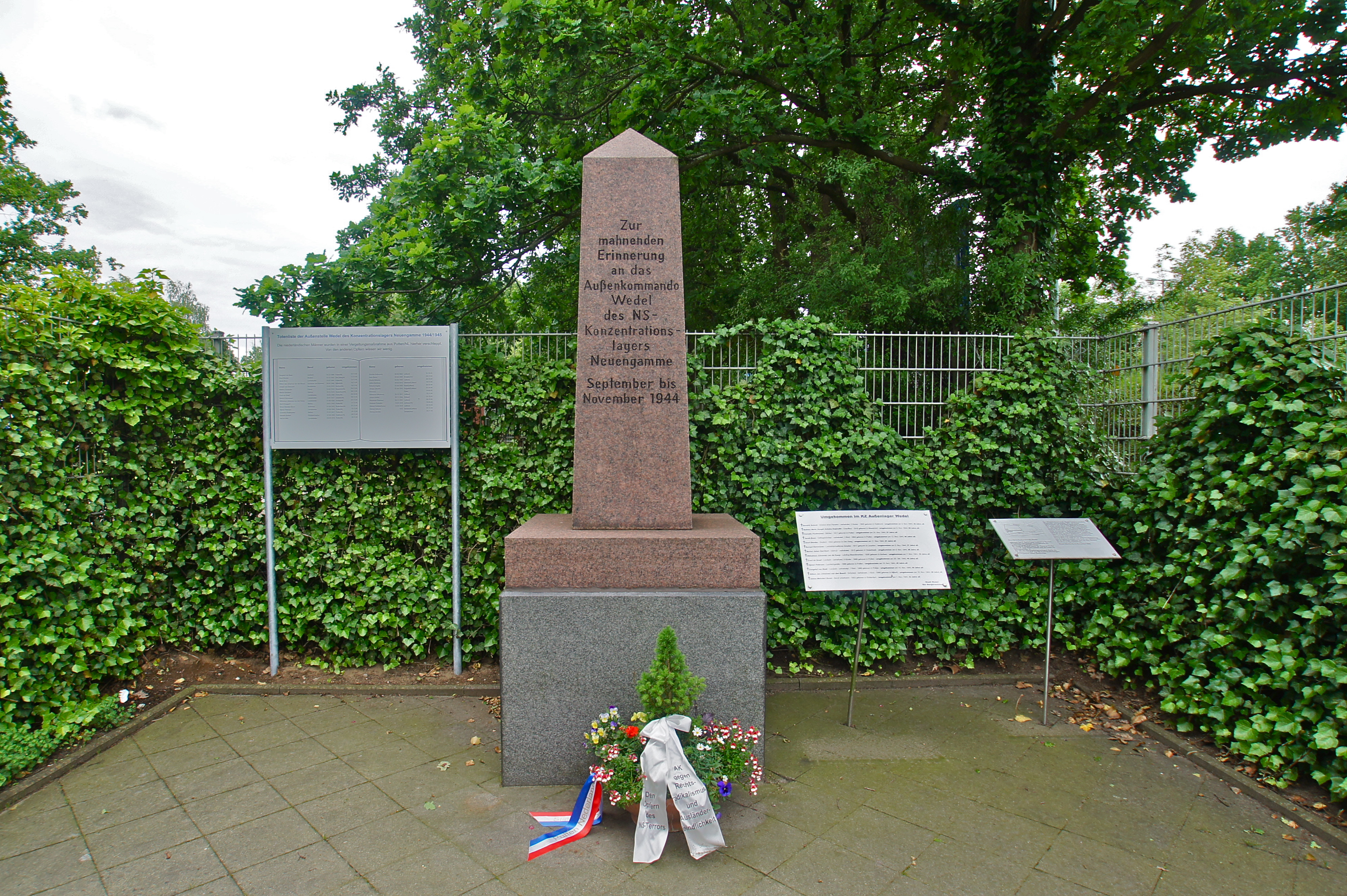
Memorial at the site of the local subcamp of the Neuengamme concentration camp

A subcamp of the Neuengamme concentration camp (No. 1541 Wedel) was located near the town. Between 13 September 1944 and 27 September 1944, five hundred Hungarian and Czech Jewish women were held there and forced to clear land and farm work. The women were later deported to the Hamburg-Eidelstedt camp. A few weeks later, on 17 October 1944, the subcamp of Neuengamme was reopened and 500 men, mostly Polish, Dutch and Soviet prisoners were used to dig anti-tank obstacles. This group included men from the town of Putten, Netherlands. On 20 November 1944, the SS closed the camp and deported the men to the camp at Meppen-Versen. During 5 weeks in this camp, 27 men died, including 10 of those from Putten.

=== Post War ===
A severe housing shortage developed as refugees streamed west out of former German territories following the war, adding to the problem caused by the bombing. A 1947 census showed that Wedel had 7,902 native inhabitants and more than 6,500 refugees.

Large-scale housing construction programs were undertaken by the city, including the construction of barrack settlements, to help integrate the refugees and other homeless. Under the plan each person was allowed 4.9 m^{2} (53 ft^{2}) of living space.

In 1954 the largest and most ambitious reconstruction project in the country was started. The building of the garden city of Elbhochufer on a 40 hectares (99 acres) area. By 1962 almost 1,200 rental flats and apartmentst and over 500 row homes were created. The city grew quickly and began to attract new business.

The well known attraction in Wedel is the Wedel-Schulau Willkomm-Höft or Welcome Point, established in 1952 to greet incoming ships. The Hamburg Yachting Club was established in the city in 1960–61 .

In 1962 and again in 1976, large tidal bores reached Wedel. As protection, dikes were built in 1978 that turned the surrounding marshes into beautiful hiking paths.

== Infrastructure ==
Today Wedel is a city with around 34,000 inhabitants and includes a rich cultural life.

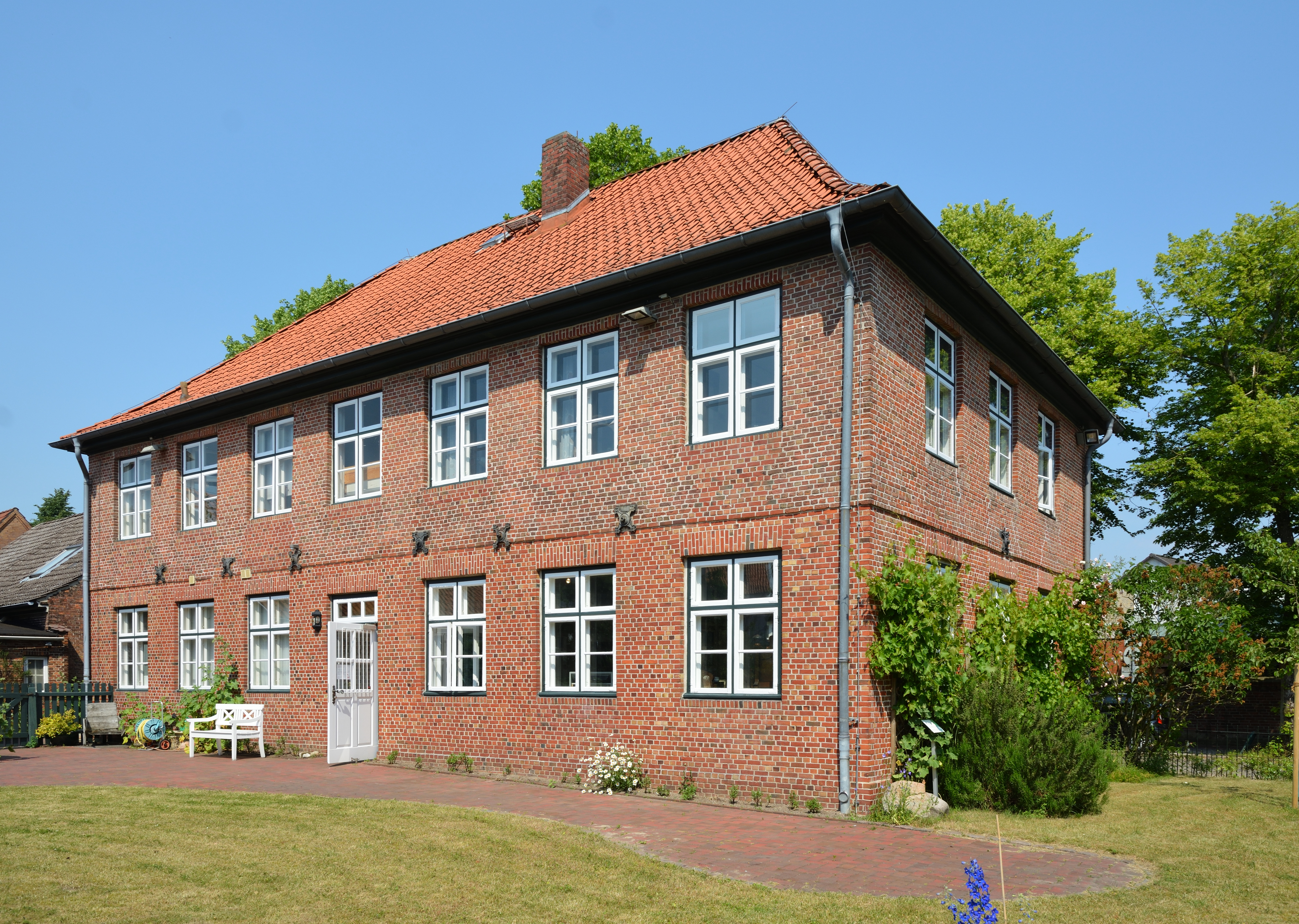
Municipal Museum

Wedel has two museums, the Ernst Barlach birth house and the city museum. In addition an amateur theatre and a theatre-ship to see art, shows, cabaret and concerts. Besides there are all school forms including the private University of Applied Sciences Wedel (FH Wedel) and the Physikalisch-Technische Lehranstalt Wedel (PTL Wedel) a private full-time vocational school. Besides these higher education institutions, there are 3 secondary schools: Johann-Rist-Gymnasium (JRG), Gebrüder-Humboldt-Schule (GHS), and Ernst-Barlach-Gemeinschaftsschule (EBG). There are also three primary schools: Altstadtschule, Moorwegschule, and Albert-Schweitzer-Schule.

It has an equipped public library, an Adult Education Center and a school of music.

Wedel is one end of the historic Hærvejen which leads 480 kilometres (300 mi) northwards to Viborg (in Denmark). Today this international path is a well-known long-distance cycling route (a small part of Euro-Velo Route 3 and walking path.

== Sport ==
Sport plays a very active role in Wedel. All different kinds of sport are played on the numerous outside sports fields and at the indoor gymnasiums. The dike and walkways in the marshlands along the Elbe are used by numerous inline skaters and cyclists. Wedel has multiple sports clubs, including Wedeler TSV and SC Cosmos Wedel for soccer, TC Wedel and TC Aue Wedel for Tennis, and SG Elbe Wedel for swimming.

Important runs and competitions in these disciplines started some years ago.

One of the town's main clubs is SC Rist Wedel. The men's basketball team plays in the ProB. The women's team plays in the 2. Damen-Basketball-Bundesliga.

== Transport ==
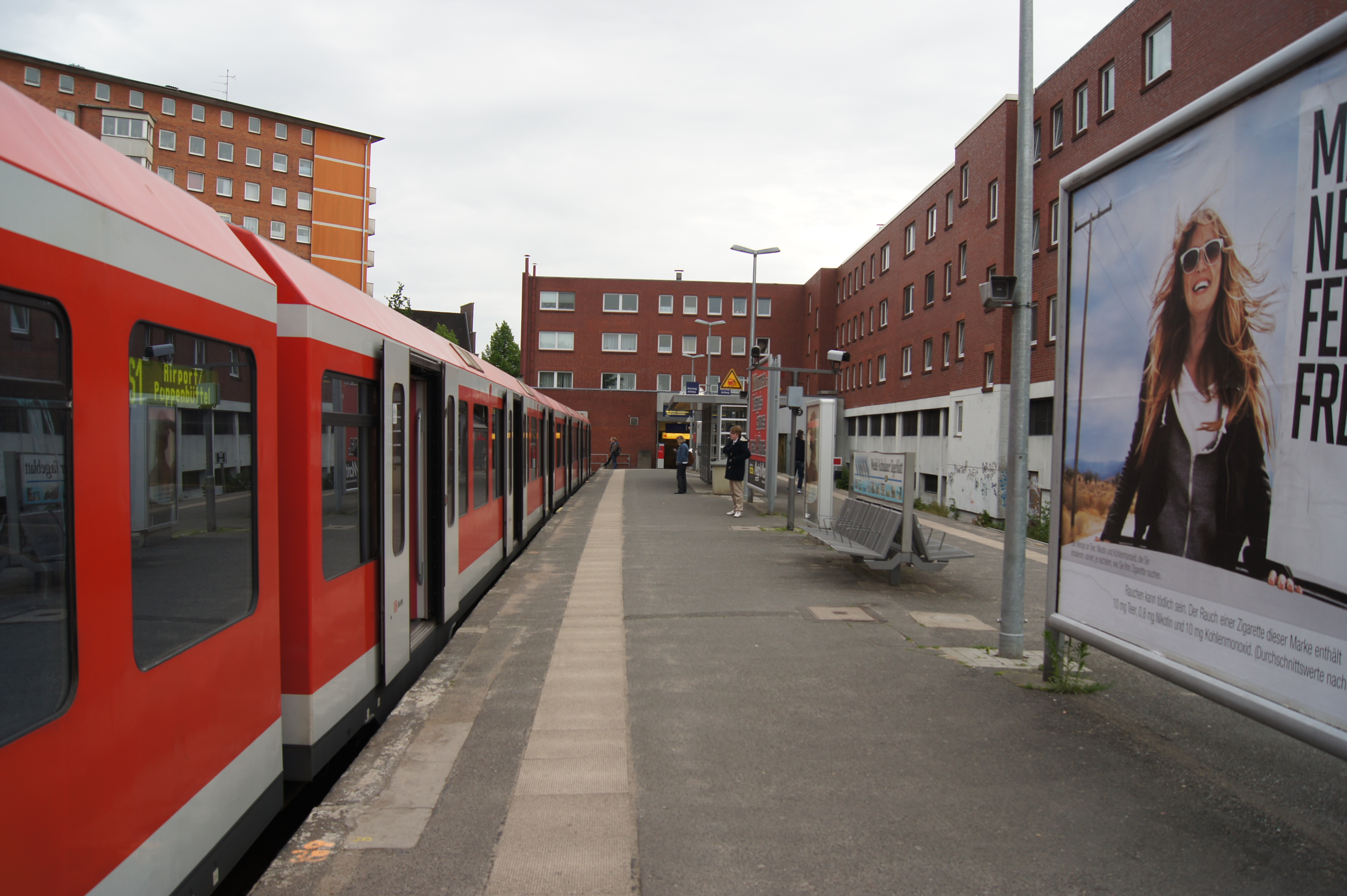
Wedel station

Wedel railway station connects the town with the rapid transit trains of the Hamburg S-Bahn toward Hamburg.

== Utilities ==
- Wedel Power Station

== Twin towns – sister cities ==
Wedel is twinned with:

- Caudry, France (1985)
- Makete District, Tanzania (1982)
- Wolgast, Germany (1989)

== Population ==
Year	1910	1925	1933	1939	1998	1999	2000	2001	2002	2003	2004	2005	2013
Number	5,938	6,168	7,661	8,308	31,850	31,783	32,060	32,221	32,354	32,164	32,014	32,177	32,289

== Notable people ==
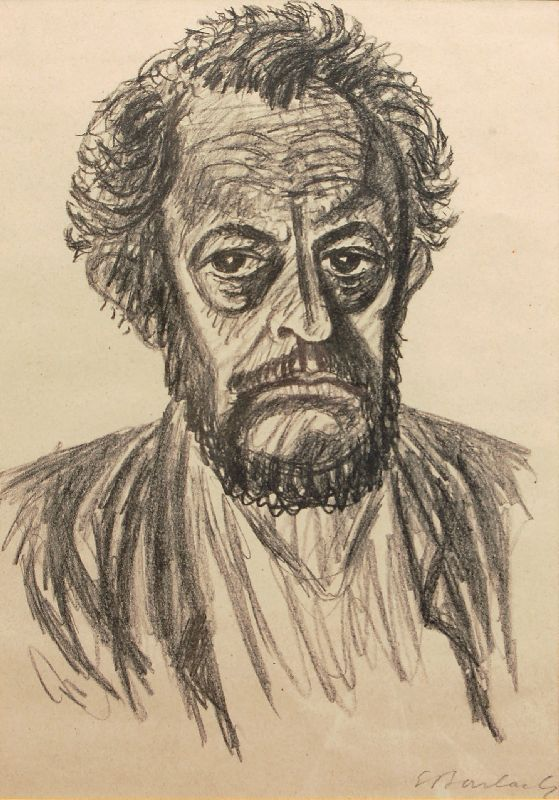
Ernst Barlach, 1928

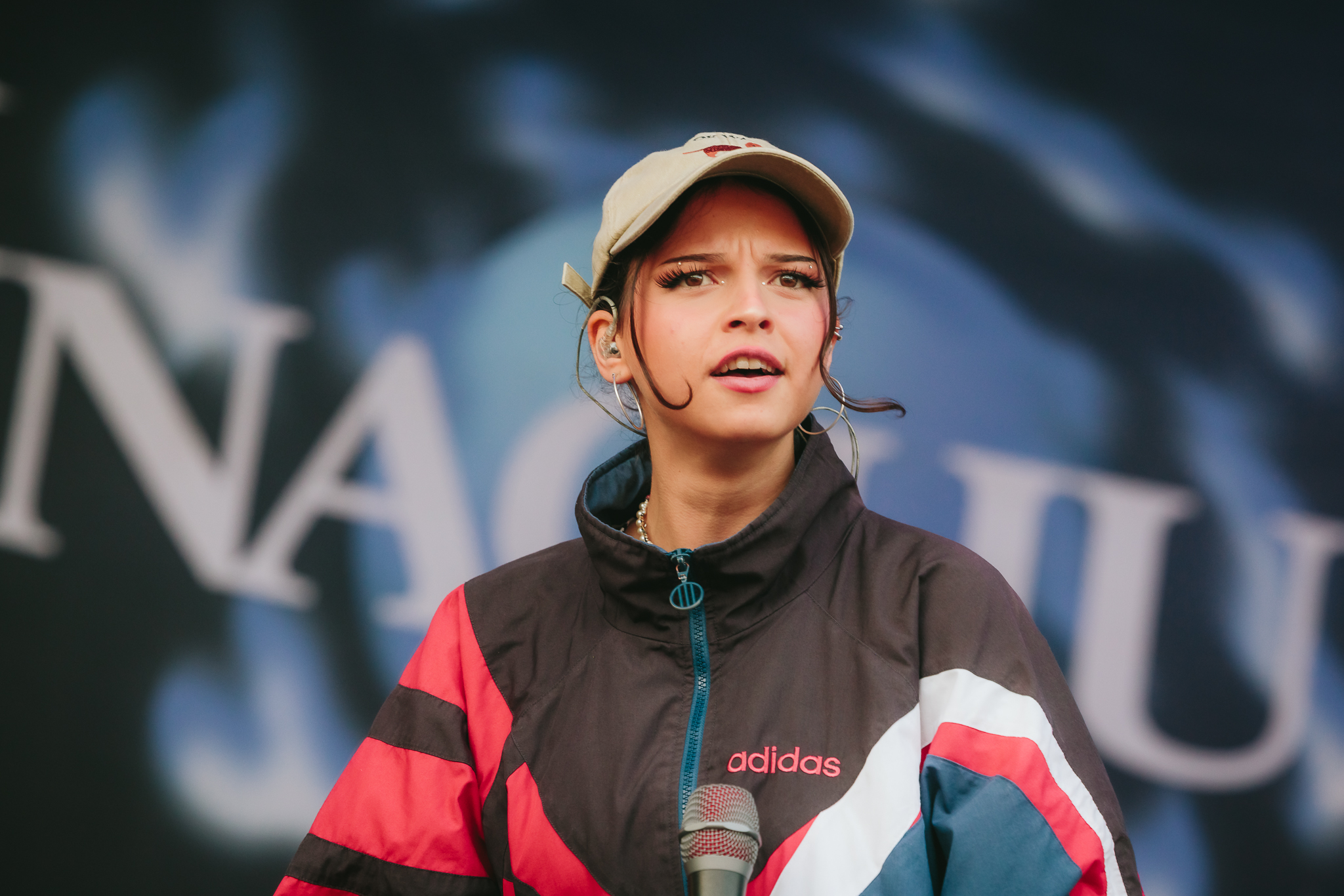
Nina Chuba, 2022

- Johann Rist (1607–1667), pastor, writer and composer
- Hermann Molkenbuhr, (DE Wiki) (1851–1927), politician
- Rudolf Höckner (1864–1942), painter
- Ernst Barlach (1870–1938), painter, sculptor and writer
- Hellmuth Walter (1900–1980), engineer and inventor
- Eduard Schüller, (DE Wiki) (1904–1976), engineer, died in Wedel
- Hansjörg Martin, (DE Wiki) (1920–1999), novelist.;ived in Wedel from 1963
- Arnim Dahl (1922–1998), stuntman, died in Wedel
- Ole West, (DE Wiki) (born 1953), painter
- Mathias Rust (born 1968), pilot who landed in Moscow on Red Square
- Dennis Grabosch (born 1978), actor
- Oceana Mahlmann (born 1982), singer.
- Nina Chuba (born 1998), singer and actress

=== Sport ===
- Thomas Seeliger (born 1966), footballer
- Philip Albrecht (born 1979), footballer
- Lennard Kämna (born 1996), road racing cyclist
