= Boat Gauging House, Tipton =

Building in Sandwell, West Midlands, England

Boat Gauging House
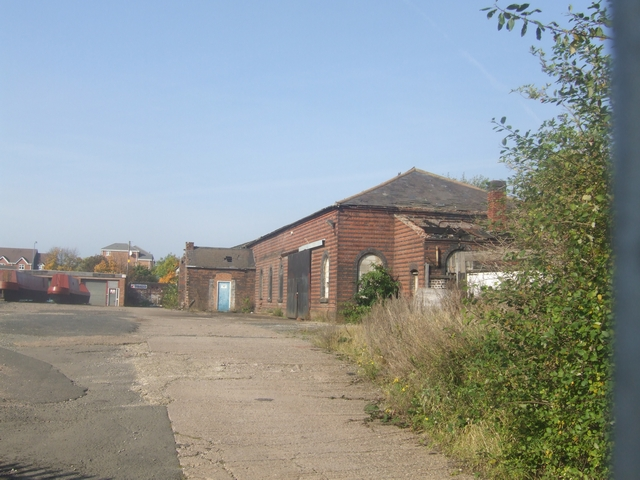

General information
- Status: Grade II listed
- Location: Tipton, West Midlands grid reference SO 951 926, United Kingdom
- Coordinates: 52°31′54.1″N 2°4′23.6″W
- Completed: 1873

The Boat Gauging House is a building in Tipton, West Midlands, England. It is situated by the Main Line of the Birmingham Canal Navigations and was used to calibrate new canal boats to later ascertain the weight of cargo carried. It is a Grade II listed building.

== Background ==
Canal companies charged boats for using the canals; fees, based on cargo weight, were collected at toll points. To assess the weight of cargo, boats were initially calibrated. The "wet" method was done during the building of the boat; the Birmingham Canal Navigations (BCN) used the "dry" method, in which a new or refitted boat was loaded from empty with ton weights. The resulting freeboard, or "dry inches", as the boat sat lower in the water, was each time noted. Gauging plates were then fixed to the boat.

== Description and history ==
The BCN built gauging houses (or gauging stations) at Smethwick in 1872, and at Tipton in 1873. The Tipton gauging house could accommodate boats up to the coal-carrying "Hampton" boats, eighty feet long. It was in use until gauging and toll collection were abandoned in 1959.

The building is next to the Factory Locks at Tipton. It is built of red and blue bricks laid in English bond, and has a hipped roof. The interior originally had two docks (since filled in) running west–east, lock gates inside the western doorways, and internal cranes.
