= Fachhochschule Wedel University of Applied Sciences =

German non-profit university of applied sciences

Coordinates: 53.5784°N 9.7285°E

- Type: Private
- Established: 1969
- Rector: Eike Harms
- Administrative staff: 125 (2019)
- Students: 1350 (2018-19)
- Location: Wedel, Schleswig-Holstein, Germany
- Website: www.fh-wedel.de

The Fachhochschule Wedel University of Applied Sciences gGmbH is one of the few private but non-profit universities of applied sciences in Germany. It is state-recognized and offers thirteen bachelor's and nine master's degrees in the fields of computer science, technology and economics. It is located on the western outskirts of Hamburg in Schleswig-Holstein and is financed through tuition fees, a state grant and third-party funding. The FH Wedel University of Applied Sciences is a family company and has been run by the third generation of the founder's grandson, Eike Harms, since it was founded in 1969 (as of November 2018). There are currently around 1,350 students enrolled at the university.

== History ==
The FH Wedel University of Applied Sciences has been a family business for three generations: founded in 1969 by Helmut Harms, his son Dirk Harms took over the management of the university in 1977. In 2010, Eike Harms, the founder's grandson, became university president and is still in charge of the university today (as of January 2026).

The history of the university goes back to 1969. At that time, the Physics and Technical School (PTL) Wedel became the FH Wedel University of Applied Sciences Wedel and laid the foundation for the education of students at university level. The educational establishment was retained and still functions as a partner institution today.

The first course at the FH Wedel University of Applied Sciences was Computer Engineering, followed in 1979 by the course in Business Informatics. Over the years, not only have new buildings been built and a non-profit company as a private sponsor and a development association founded, but also study abroad and dual studies have been introduced and a number of new courses have been launched:

- 1991: Degree in Industrial Engineering
- 1997: Diploma course in Media InformaticsComputer Science
- 2000: Master's degree in Computer Science
- 2003: Bachelor's and master's degree in Business Administration
- 2011: Bachelor's and master's degree in E-commerce
- 2014: Bachelor's degree in Computer Games Technology and master's degree in IT Security
- 2015: Bachelor's and master's degree in IT Engineering
- 2016: Bachelor courses in IT Management, Consulting & Auditing and Smart Technology

== Courses ==
Degree programs leading to a Bachelor of Science (B. Sc.):

- Business Administration
- Computer Games Technology
- Data Science & Artificial Intelligence
- E-Commerce
- Computer Science
- IT Engineering
- IT Management, Consulting & Auditing
- Media Computer Science
- Smart Technology
- Computer Engineering
- Business Informatics
- Industrial Engineering

Degree programs leading to a Master of Science (M. Sc.):

- Business Administration
- Business Informatics / IT Management
- Data Science & Artificial Intelligence
- E-Commerce
- Computer Science
- IT Engineering
- IT Security
- Industrial Engineering

All courses can also be studied in the dual study model. As a university of applied sciences, teaching and research at the FH Wedel University of Applied Sciences is more application-oriented than at a university. Students put their knowledge into practice through exercises, projects or activities as working students.

The contacts to the economy are close and there are numerous partnerships with companies where students can complete internships, write theses or find employment. In addition, company representatives are involved in teaching through lectures and projects.

Together with several companies, the FH Wedel University of Applied Sciences offers particularly good and committed students scholarships. Here it cooperates with the Grohe-Treuhandstiftung, OTTO, NovaTec, Hapag-Lloyd, BIT-SERV and msg nexinsure ag.

== Partner universities ==
The university has been offering a semester abroad since 1996. At the beginning it relied on cooperations with universities overseas. Later, with the Erasmus program, other European countries were included. The university now cooperates with around 30 partner universities worldwide.
