= Hartwig of Uthlede =

German nobleman and Prince-Archbishop of Bremen

Hartwig II von Uthlede
- Prince-Archbishop of Bremen
- Church: Roman Catholic Church
- See: Archdiocese of Bremen
- In office: 1184/5–1207
- Predecessor: Siegfried
- Successor: Burghard

Personal details
- Born: unknown Uthlede
- Died: 3 November 1207

Hartwig of Uthlede (died 3 November 1207) was a German nobleman who – as Hartwig II – Prince-Archbishop of Bremen (1185–1190 and de facto again 1192–1207) and one of the originators of the Livonian Crusade.

== Biography ==
Coming from a family of the Bremian Ministerialis at Uthlede, he was a canon of Bremen Cathedral and a clerk of Duke Henry the Lion of Saxony, House of Guelph, before becoming prince-archbishop in 1185. When the Bremian cathedral chapter elected him for prince-archbishop, due to the competitive politics within Kingdom of Germany at the time, this was regarded a Guelphic triumph.

A canon named Meinhard, originally from the Augustinian monastery at Segeberg (in Hartwig's diocese), was active at Üxküll among the pagan Livonians, apparently attempting to gain converts through preaching. In 1186, one year into Hartwig's episcopate, the prince-archbishop intervened and gave him the status of a bishop, in effect seizing control of missionary efforts there. The historian Eric Christiansen judged this to be part of Hartwig's attempt to resurrect his see's former glory, when it "had exercised authority over the entire Northern world". Papal records of 1188 indicate that the bishopric which had been established "in Russia" by Meinhard was recognised by the papacy as subordinate to the prince-archbishopric of Bremen. In Livonia, despite a further decade of activity, Bishop Meinhard had made little progress and died in 1196.

In 1186 Hartwig and his bailiff in Bremen confirmed the Gelnhausen Privilege, by which Frederick I Barbarossa granted the city of Bremen considerable privileges. The city was recognised as political entity of its own law. Property within the municipal boundaries could not be subjected to feudal overlordship, this was true also for serfs acquiring property, if they managed to live in the city for a year and a day, after which they were to be regarded as free persons. Property was to be freely inherited without feudal claims to reversion (allodification of real estate). This privilege laid the foundation for Bremen's later status of imperial immediacy.

Hartwig prepared the subjection of the trans-Elbian free peasants republic of Ditmarsh, religiously belonging to the Archdiocese of Bremen but rejecting Bremian secular princely overlordship. He persuaded Adolphus III of Schauenburg, Count of Holstein, to waive his claim to Ditmarsh in return for regular dues levied from them to be subjected Ditmarsians. In 1187 and 1188 Hartwig and his ally Maurice I, Count of Oldenburg heading their troops invaded Ditmarsh. The free peasants promised to pay him dues, only to mock about him, once he and his soldiers had left. The Ditmarsians gained support by Valdemar, steward of the Duchy of Schleswig and Bishop of Schleswig. Hartwig, owing dues to Adolphus III and the soldiers' pay to Maurice I, was trapped. He had to cede the dues of three years, levied from Bremian ministerialis families, to Maurice I and Adolphus III. Hartwig now tried to impose an extra tax of 200 Bremian Marks onto the burghers of the city of Bremen, but the city refused and gained support by emperor Frederick I, whom the city helped with fully equipped cogs and remittances of funds in the Third Crusade to the Holy Land. Between April and June 1189 the dispute between the city and the prince-archbishop escalated to uproar so that Hartwig had to leave the city.

While Frederick I, together with King Richard I of England and – among others – Adolphus III, left for the Third Crusade, Frederick's defeated rival, Henry the Lion, Richard's brother-in-law, promised to stay calm in English exile. But instead Henry returned in September 1189 and Hartwig warmly welcomed him in Stade and ceded him the Bremian County of Stade with the pertaining revenues. Henry the Lion invaded the County of Holstein, whose absent ruler Adolphus III, a former vassal of Henry, he blamed for felony. Meanwhile, Frederick I's son Henry VI, holding the imperial stake, and his troops seized most of Henry the Lion's allodially owned Guelphic possessions around the city of Brunswick, but not the city itself. Arriving at Bremen in 1190, Henry VI withdrew Hartwig's princely competences (regalia) and forced him to England and then Lüneburg in exile, returning after a few years. Henry VI and Henry the Lion reached a peace settlement. Adolphus III regained Holstein, an imperial fief, and took the County of Stade, a Bremian fief. Henry VI granted the city of Bremen all prince-episcopal revenues levied in the city, such as fines payable to the prince-archiepiscopal bailiff in Bremen, tolls and the seigniorages of the mint.

In 1192 the Bremian Chapter didn't wait any longer for a papal dismissal of Hartwig and unauthorisedly elected Bishop Valdemar as its new prince-archbishop – encouraged by Henry VI. Valdemar welcomed his election, hoping his new position could be helpful in his dispute with Duke Valdemar of Schleswig and his elder brother Canute VI of Denmark. Before entering the prince-archbishopric he won the support of Ditmarsh. Duke Valdemar and Canute VI realised the threat Prince-Archbishop Valdemar presented and caught him in 1193, keeping him in captivity until 1206.

In 1193 Henry the Lion's son Henry the Younger married a cousin of Henry VI and in March 1194 the two Henrys were reconciled. Thus Hartwig could consider to regain the Bremian see. In July 1194 Ulrich, Prince-Bishop of Minden, and Rudolph I, Prince-Bishop of Verden negotiated with the Bremian Chapter an agreement under which conditions Hartwig could return to the see. Hartwig obliged himself not to pledge or enfeoff the revenues from his prince-archiepiscopal estates, any reverted Bremian vassal fief (like Ditmarsh or the County of Stade) or the tax revenues levied in the cities of Bremen and Stade without the consent of the Chapter.

The burghers of Bremen refused to pay Hartwig the prince-archiepiscopal revenues, arguing Henry VI would first have to re-enfeoff Hartwig with his princely power. Also Adolphus III refused to provide dues from the Bremian County of Stade. Hartwig therefore excommunicated Adolphus III and imposed the interdict upon the city of Bremen and the entire Bremian diocese.

In October 1195 at the Diet in Gelnhausen Adolphus III and Hartwig reached an agreement, which Henry VI confirmed. Adolphus III would further administer the County of Stade and keep a third of all its revenues for himself. In the same year Hartwig had convinced Pope Celestine III to confer the same spiritual benefits gained by Levantine crusaders also to Catholics visiting the valley of the Western Dvina.

In 1196 Hartwig appointed the Cistercian Berthold, abbot of Loccum, to fill the vacancy at Üxküll. In 1197 Hartwig – together with Henry VI, Adolphus III and many others – headed for the Crusade to the Holy Land, which ended prematurely when Henry VI died of malaria. In 1198, Pope Innocent III repeated Celestine's privileges, while an expedition to Livonia was being prepared. Prince-Archbishop Hartwig recruited an army of Saxon crusaders which were sent to Livonia under Bishop Berthold of Hanover in 1198. The Saxon army met a Livonian army and defeated it, but the bishop was killed during the battle.

Not being discouraged, Hartwig appointed another canon of Bremen, his nephew Albert von Buxhövden, as the new Bishop of Üxküll. Together they recruited another large army of Saxon knights, eventually sending an expedition of 500 armed "pilgrims" in 13 naval vessels. Bishop Albert's campaigns were more successful, removing his see to a new site at Riga and founding a viable crusader state. Prince-Archbishop Hartwig died on 3 November 1207, while this was ongoing. Hartwig was buried in the old St. Angar's church (German: Ev. Kirche St. Ansgarii) in Bremen.

== Notes ==
Hartwig of Uthlede Born: unknown Died: 3 November 1207 in Bremen
Regnal titles
Catholic Church titles
Vacant Title last held by Siegfried, Count of Anhalt; 1180–1184; 1184–1185 rule by the Chapter	Prince-Archbishop of Bremen as Hartwig II; 1185–1190 and again 1194–1207 (He was dismissed in 1190, with the Chapter ruling, which elected in 1192 Valdemar of Denmark, who – held in Danish captivity – couldn't ascend, then Hartwig captured de facto reign again in 1194)	Succeeded by Burchard of Stumpenhausen
