= Sandstedt =

- Ortsteil of Hagen im Bremischen
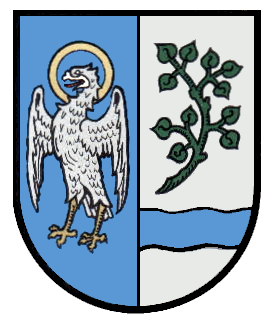
- Coat of arms
- Interactive map of Sandstedt
- Location within Germany Location within Lower Saxony
- Coordinates: 53°21′35″N 08°31′28″E
- Country: Germany
- State: Lower Saxony
- District: Cuxhaven
- Municipality: Hagen im Bremischen

Area
  - Total: 56.22 km^{2} (21.71 sq mi)
- Elevation: 2 m (6.6 ft)

Population (2012-12-31)
  - Total: 1,556
  - Density: 27.68/km^{2} (71.68/sq mi)
- Time zone: UTC+01:00 (CET)
  - Summer (DST): UTC+02:00 (CEST)
- Postal codes: 27628
- Dialling codes: 04296, 04702
- Vehicle registration: CUX
- Website: www.hagen-cux.de

Sandstedt is a village and a former municipality in the district of Cuxhaven, in Lower Saxony, Germany. Since 1 January 2014, it is part of the municipality Hagen im Bremischen.
