= Philip Albrecht =

German footballer

Personal information
- Date of birth: 21 November 1979 (age 46)
- Place of birth: Wedel, West Germany
- Height: 1.85 m (6 ft 1 in)
- Position: Forward

Youth career
- Wedeler TSV
- Hamburger SV

Senior career*
Years	Team	Apps	(Gls)
–2000	VfL Pinneberg		
2000–2002	FC St. Pauli II		
2002–2006	FC St. Pauli	17	(1)
- * Club domestic league appearances and goals

Philip Albrecht (born 21 November 1979) is a German former professional footballer who played as a forward.

== Career ==
Albrecht began his career with Wedeler TSV before joining the youth team of Hamburger SV. He then signed a contract with VfL Pinneberg. In 2000, he was scouted by FC St. Pauli and spent one season with them in the Bundesliga. He retired in 2006.
