= Toll point =

Place on a canal where a fee was collected as boats carrying cargo passed

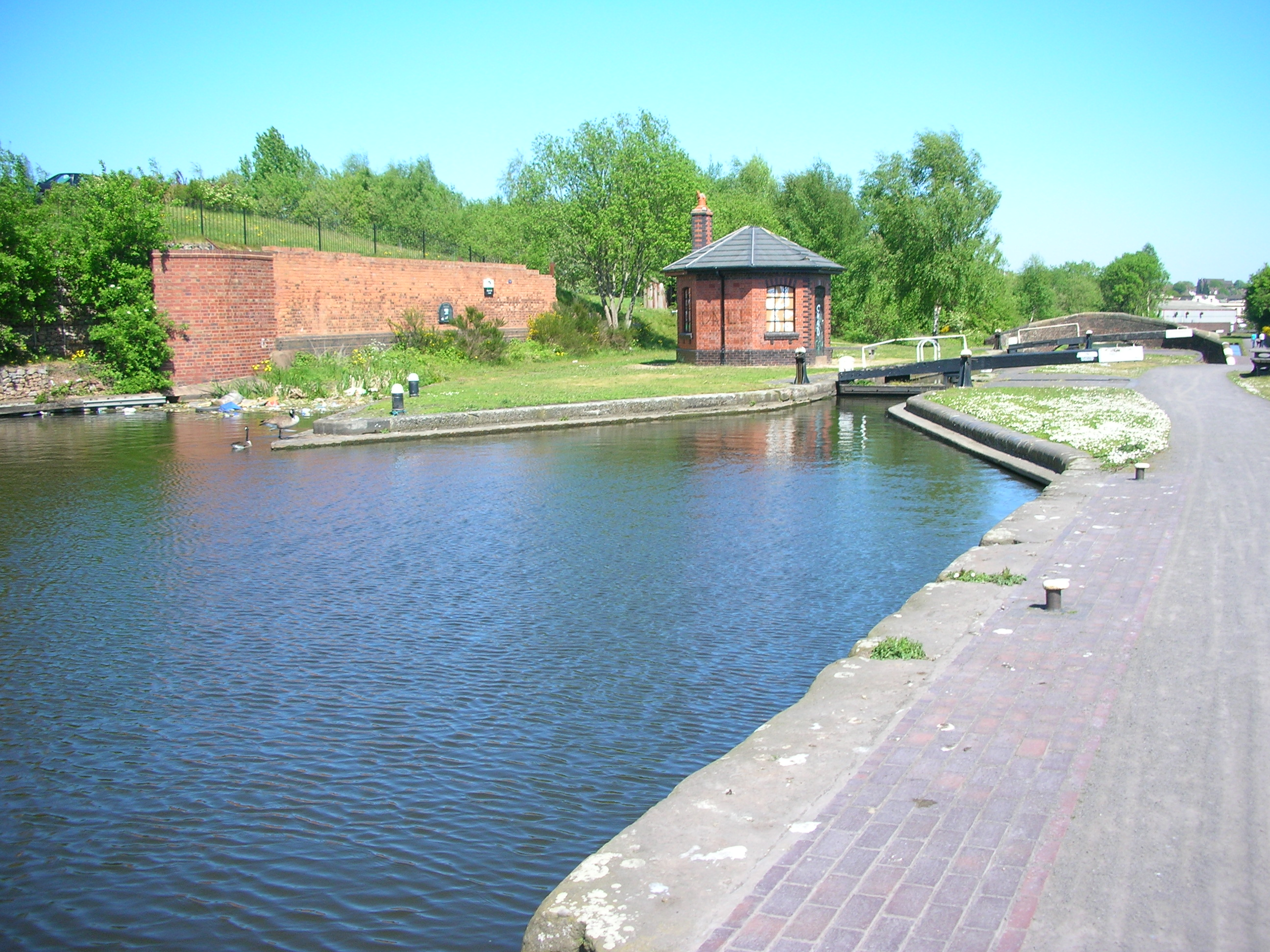
Octagonal BCN toll house at Smethwick top lock

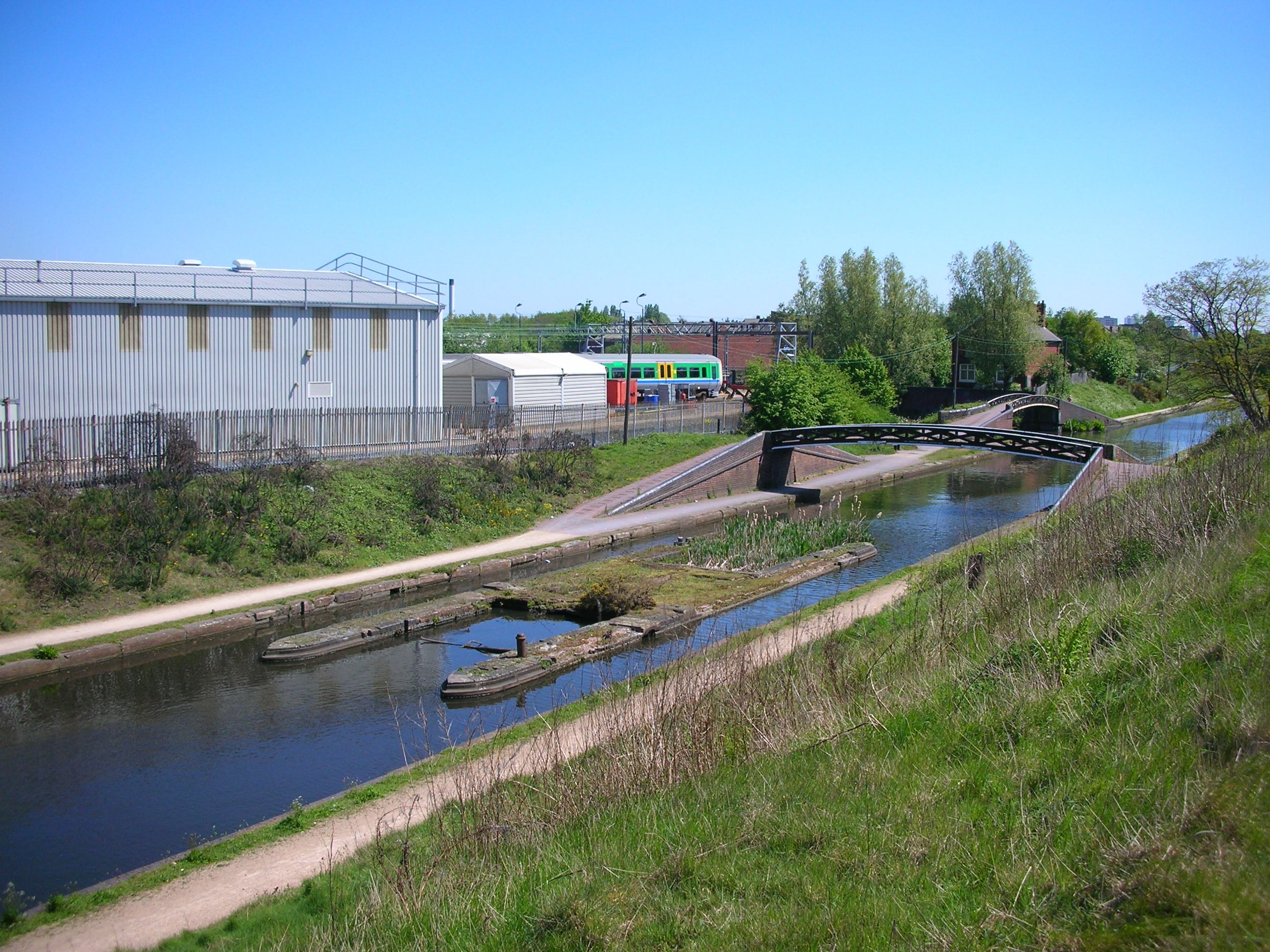
Derelict toll island at Winson Green Junction on the BCN Main Line at today's Smethwick - Birmingham boundary

In the United Kingdom a toll point or toll island is a place on a canal where a fee was collected as boats carrying cargo passed. These were sited at strategic points such as the stop lock at the transition from one canal company to another where water transfer was a concern, or at busy locks where water usage and pumping costs were an issue.

Generally this was at a lock or an artificially constricted part of the canal so that the boat had to pass within inches of the toll point unable to evade the toll. On canals where the fee was based on cargo weight it also put the boat in a convenient place to read the gauging mark height from the water line. On busy canals which were built with a towpath on either side such as the Birmingham Canal Navigations BCN New Main Line the toll house may have been built on an island between two constricted channels so that one toll point could collect from boats travelling in each direction. The BCN retains several of these islands, for example at Winson Green Junction.

== Waterway toll fee ==
The maximum tolls were set by the river navigation and canal Acts. Some early Acts allowed fees to be set by local commissioners or Quarter Sessions, but from 1720 fees could only be reassessed by Parliament.

Fees were set in pence per mile, or part. Sometimes empty boats were exempt, or free if returning loaded, or if water was running over the weirs. Fees depended on the type of cargo. Coal, stone and lime were the cheapest, then iron ore, then finished goods, with perishables and packets being the most expensive. Tolls might be refunded for long distance trips to encourage expansion of trade - "drawbacks" - particularly applied to the coal trade.

Some exceptions were made to placate local land owners. The delivery of straw, manure or road building materials, as well as coal for the poor (5,000 tons per year on the Derby Canal), or contribution to county rates may have freed the carrier of toll fees.

In the 1790s toll fees were greatly reduced by Parliament to encourage canal use. In practice, competition kept tolls below the maximum, particularly after the arrival of the railways.

Special tolls existed for use of boat lifts, inclined planes and tunnels, but companies were not allowed to charge different tolls for special customers or over different parts of the line until 1845 (the Canal Tolls Act).

Another type of toll was the compensation toll, charged on a new canal joining an existing waterway, perhaps 5d. on all goods.

Fees were paid by the boatman or by account. Fraud was common: under declaration of the cargo (proved by gauging or by dry weighing of the boat), hiding valuable goods under cheaper cargo, or by bribery.

Tolls lasted until nationalisation in 1948 but are still paid by commercial carriers on commercial waterways. Pleasure boats pay British Waterways an annual licence fee based on the length of the craft.

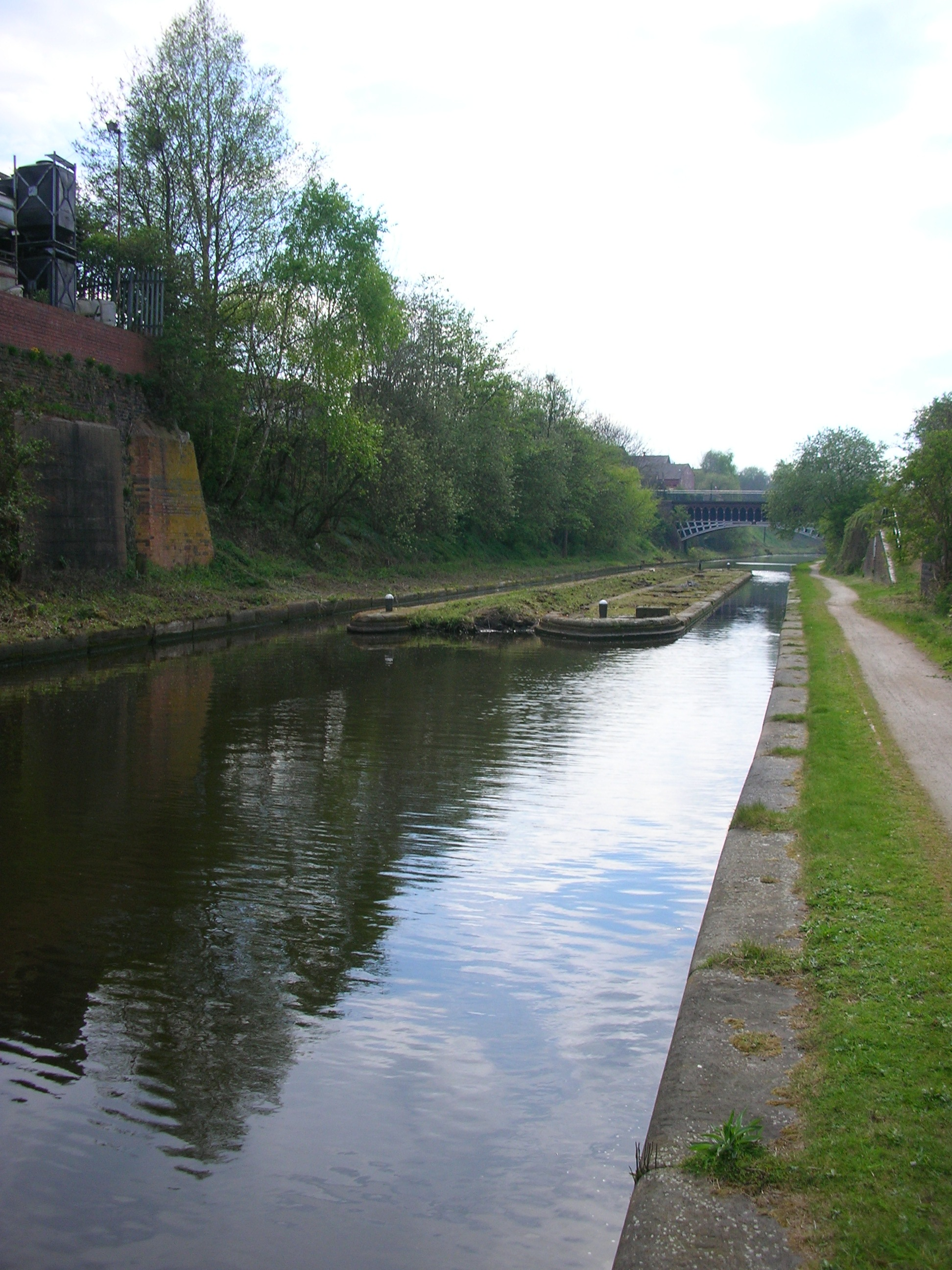
Derelict gauging station island at Engine Arm Aqueduct, Smethwick on the BCN

== Gauging point ==
Canals were set up as commercial enterprises. The fee for using the canals was dependent on the type of cargo and its weight. Each boat had to have four (or, for some canal companies - Swansea, Glamorganshire, Oxford, six) gauging plates fitted to the hull at the "corners" of the boat - bow and stern at each side - indicating a measurement point and a boat serial number.

The boat was calibrated by measuring the height of the gunwales above water level at each corner with the boat unladen and then measured again when known weights had been loaded into the boat from an overhead gantry. These measurements were logged in toll-keeper's tables and copies sent to every toll office within the boat's trading range. At toll offices if a toll collector suspected an incorrect waybill (declared cargo) the height of the four corners of the boat were checked with a gauging stick and averaged to allow for uneven cargo loading. That boat's entry in the gauging table was used to determine the cargo weight. The toll fee was worked out from the weight and cargo type.

== Gauging station ==
The fitting and calibration of gauging plates was done at a gauging station or indexing station. On the Birmingham Canal Navigations (BCN) Main Line the Smethwick Gauging Station near the Engine Arm Aqueduct was on an island, with a covered gantry in a centre channel where boats were loaded with weights, plated and calibrated. The channels either side allowed two-way traffic and possibly the collection of tolls. The buildings and equipment were demolished in the 1940s. Another BCN indexing station at Tipton survives. Here iron weights were loaded, four tons at a time. Other canal companies had stations at Etruria on the Trent and Mersey Canal and Northwich on the Weaver.

The gauging plates originally had scales showing the tonnage marked on them but around 1810 the method of using tables was implemented, often supplemented by a visible scale for quick checking. Boats were re-indexed every ten years as their wooden infrastructure became waterlogged and they ran lower in the water.

== See also ==
- Canals of the United Kingdom
- History of the British canal system
