= Imana (disambiguation) =

IMANA may refer to:

- Imana, a deity in African mythology
- The Islamic Medical Association of North America, headquartered in Lombard, Illinois
- CS Imana, a football club in Matadi, Democratic Republic of Congo
