= Uthlede =

Ortsteil in Lower Saxony, Germany

- Ortsteil of Hagen im Bremischen
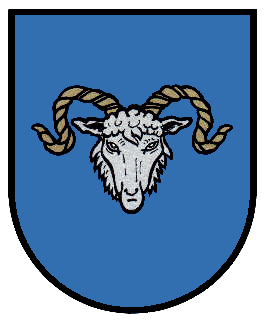
- Coat of arms
- Interactive map of Uthlede
- Location within Germany Location within Lower Saxony
- Coordinates: 53°19′N 08°35′E
- Country: Germany
- State: Lower Saxony
- District: Cuxhaven
- Municipality: Hagen im Bremischen

Area
  - Total: 15.46 km^{2} (5.97 sq mi)
- Elevation: 10 m (33 ft)

Population (2012-12-31)
  - Total: 1,014
  - Density: 65.59/km^{2} (169.9/sq mi)
- Time zone: UTC+01:00 (CET)
  - Summer (DST): UTC+02:00 (CEST)
- Postal codes: 27628
- Dialling codes: 04296
- Vehicle registration: CUX
- Website: www.uthlede.de

Uthlede is a village and a former municipality in the district of Cuxhaven, in Lower Saxony, Germany. Since 1 January 2014, it is part of the municipality Hagen im Bremischen.

Uthlede belonged to the Prince-Archbishopric of Bremen, established in 1180 AD. In 1648 the Prince-Archbishopric was transformed into the Duchy of Bremen, which was first ruled in personal union by the Swedish Crown - interrupted by a Danish occupation (1712–1715) - and from 1715 on by the Hanoverian Crown. The Kingdom of Hanover incorporated the Duchy in a real union and the Ducal territory, including Uthlede, became part of the new Stade Region, established in 1823.
