= Imants =

Male given name

- Gender: Male
- Name day: 1 July

Origin
- Region of origin: Latvia

Other names
- Related names: Imanta

Imants is a Latvian masculine given name, from the Livonian language: im meaning "miracle" added to and meaning "gift". The name is borne by more than 6,250 men in Latvia. Its nameday is celebrated on 1 July.

The name is one of the relatively few surviving Latvian names of indigenous origin from among the great number revived or introduced during the Latvian National Awakening of the late 19th and early 20th centuries.

According to the Latvian calendar, the name day for Imants is July 1.

A female variant, "Imanta" was included in a 1915 calendar and first recorded in 1921. Variations of it, such as "Ima", "Imandra", "Imanda", and "Imulis" were also later in the 20th century, though the last two were only recorded once. The associated name day is August 19.

== Individuals ==
The name Imants may refer to the following:

- Imants Barušs, Canadian professor of psychology
- Imants Bleidelis (born 1975), Latvian footballer
- Imants Bodnieks (born 1941), Latvian racing cyclist
- Imants Freibergs (1934–2026), Latvian computer scientist, First Gentleman of Latvia (1999–2007)
- Imants Kalniņš (born 1941), Latvian composer
- Imants Kokars (1921–2011), Latvian music pedagogue and conductor
- Imants Lancmanis (born 1941), Latvian art historian
- Imants Lešinskis (1931–1985), KGB agent
- Imants Lieģis (born 1955), Latvian ambassador
- Imants Ozers (born 1960), artist
- Imants Priede (born 1948), British-Latvian zoologist, author and academic
- Imants Sudmalis (1916–1944), Latvian communist and Soviet partisan
- Imants Tillers (born 1950), Australian artist
- Imants Zemzaris (born 1951), Latvian composer
- Imants Ziedonis (1933–2013), Latvian poet

== Sources ==
- Pilsonības un Migrācijas Lietu Parvalde (PMLP): Office of Citizenship and Migration Affairs personal name database (in Latvian)
