= Hærvejen =

Ancient trackway in Denmark and Schleswig-Holstein, Germany

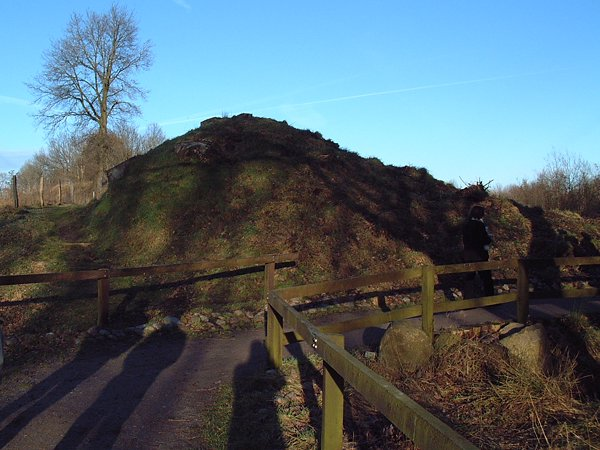
Hærvejen crossing the Dannevirke

Hærvejen (Danish, literally: the army road, German: Ochsenweg, literally: oxen way, Low German: Ossenpadd, literally: oxen path), sometimes referred to in English as the Ox Road, is the name given to an ancient trackway in Denmark and Schleswig-Holstein. The route runs from Viborg via Flensburg to Hamburg, the territory of which it entered at Ochsenzoll ("oxen toll", "toll" in the meaning of "customs") and where it connected with other roads. It has been known by several other names throughout history, most importantly "the Cattle Road" (Studevejen) and "the Oxen Road" or "Ox Road" (Oksevejen / Ochsenweg).

== History ==
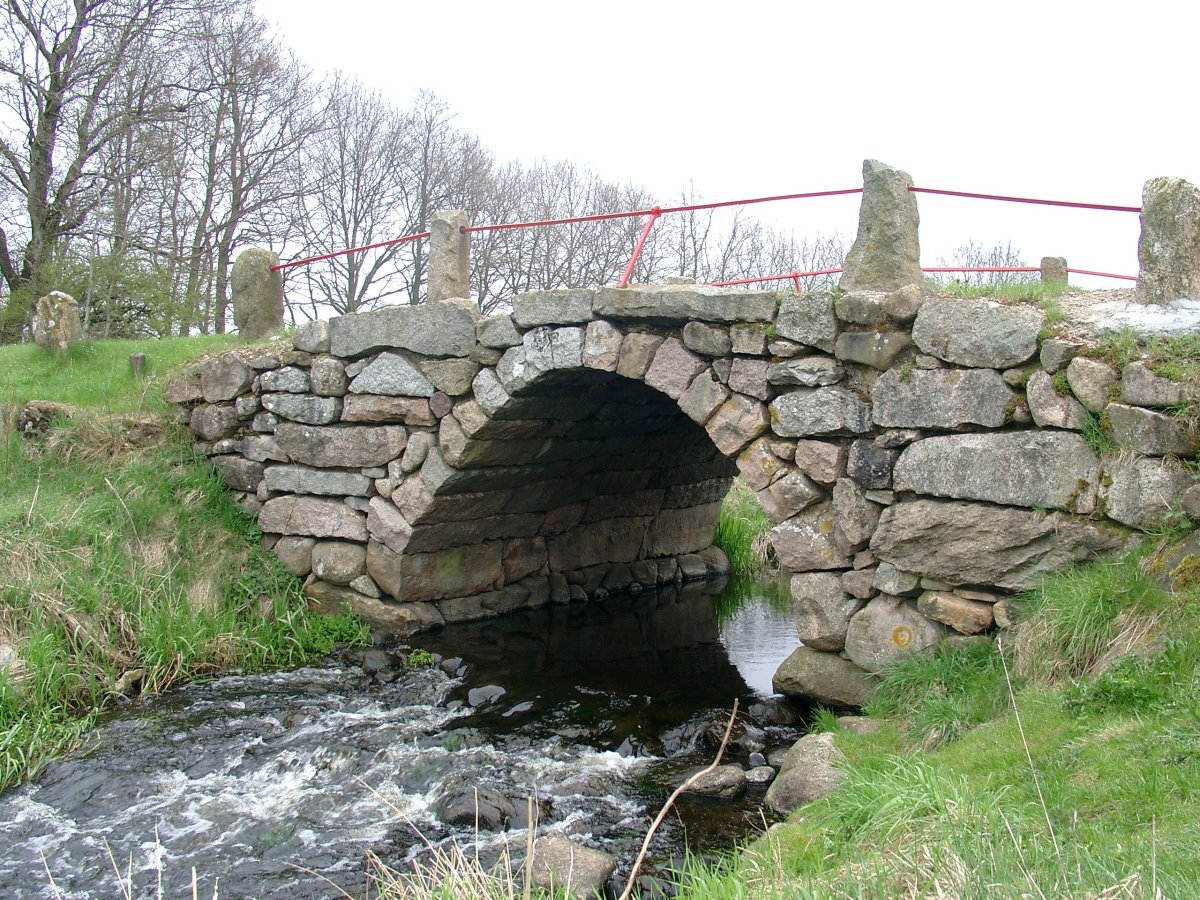
Povl's Bridge from 1744

The road runs more or less along the watershed of the Jutland Peninsula, known as the Jyske Højderyg (Jutland Ridge), similar to the ridgeways in England. By using this route one could avoid rivers, or ford them close to their origins where they were still shallow. As time went by this route was improved with paved fords, embankments and bridges. Concentrations of mounds, defensive ditches, settlements and other historic landmarks can be found along the road. While sections of it can be traced as far back as 4000 BC, newer road construction has erased many traces. Some of them show a width of up to 100 metres (330 ft). The use of the road declined during the Viking age, as transportation by ship became more convenient. New cities were constructed along the coast instead of the road.

Two of Denmark's oldest settlements, Viborg and Jelling are situated along the road.

In the southern, narrow part of the Jutish peninsula the trackway followed the edge of western marshes and eastern moraine country. Near Haderslev, Åbenrå, Flensburg, and Schleswig, it branched into western bypasses on the hills and accesses to the towns, each of them localized at the inner end of a long, narrow bay. One of the southern ends of the Ochsenweg has given its name to a suburb of Hamburg: Ochsenzoll is the locality of the ancient custom post.

Part of the tracks westerly bypassed Hamburg towards Wedel bei Hamburg or Blankenese, where a ferry passing the Elbe connected to Cranz (then Prince-Archbishopric of Bremen). An easterly bypass headed for Zollenspieker Ferry (a Hamburg-Lübeckian condominium between 1420 and 1868), passing the same river towards Hoopte in the then Principality of Lunenburg. From south of the Elbe the cattle tracks continued up to Westphalia.

== Use ==
The road was primarily a trade road. The most important commodity was livestock (especially the eponymous oxen), but also amber, hides, honey and fur went south. Annually up to 50,000 head of cattle came along the oxen road prior to the Industrial Age. Metal, glass and weapons went north. In spite of the most familiar Danish name, it was seldom used for military invasions, neither northwards, nor southwards. Nevertheless, many defensive constructions can be found straddling the road up through Jutland.

== Today ==
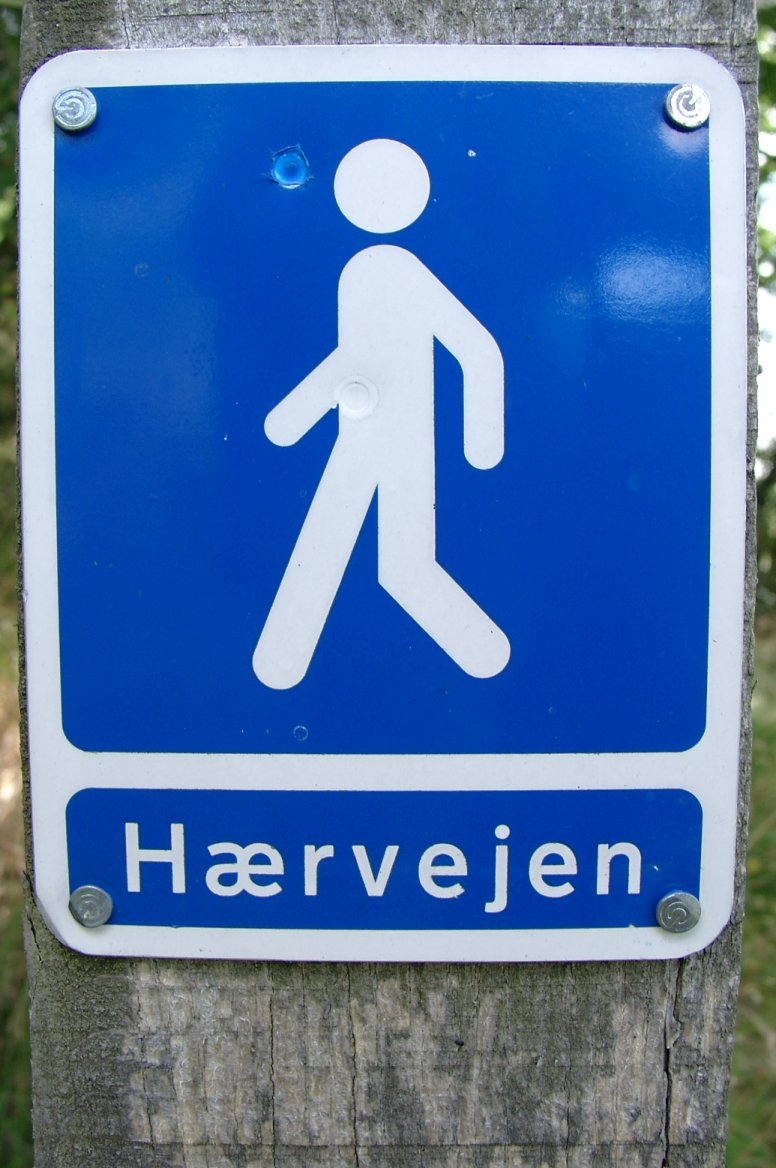
A sign for the modern Danish Hærvejen walking route

Today modern highways follow the route of the old road. At a few places it is still possible to see the old tracks, embankments, sheep pens and fords. Parts of it have been converted into a long-distance walking route. A popular walk known as Hærvejsmarchen takes place each year. An international cycle route has been marked from the Elbe to Viborg.
