= Bramstedt =

- Ortsteil of Hagen im Bremischen
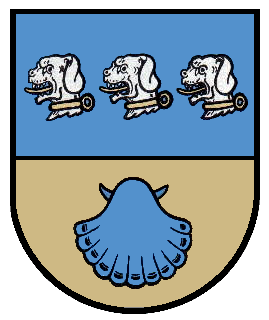
- Coat of arms

- Bramstedt in Hagen
- Interactive map of Bramstedt
- Location within Germany Location within Lower Saxony
- Coordinates: 53°22′00″N 08°41′37″E
- Country: Germany
- State: Lower Saxony
- District: Cuxhaven
- Municipality: Hagen im Bremischen

Area
  - Total: 44.85 km^{2} (17.32 sq mi)
- Elevation: 10 m (33 ft)

Population (2012-12-31)
  - Total: 1,892
  - Density: 42.19/km^{2} (109.3/sq mi)
- Time zone: UTC+01:00 (CET)
  - Summer (DST): UTC+02:00 (CEST)
- Postal codes: 27628
- Dialling codes: 04746, 04748, 04793
- Website: www.hagen-cux.de

Bramstedt is a village and a former municipality in the district of Cuxhaven, in Lower Saxony, Germany. Since 1 January 2014, it is part of the municipality Hagen im Bremischen.

Bramstedt belonged to the Prince-Archbishopric of Bremen. In 1648, the Prince-Archbishopric was transformed into the Duchy of Bremen, which was first ruled in personal union by the Swedish and from 1715 on by the Hanoverian Crown. In 1823, the Duchy was abolished and its territory became part of the Stade Region.
