= Gürtel, Vienna =

Main thoroughfare in Vienna

Coordinates: 48°11′57″N 16°20′19″E

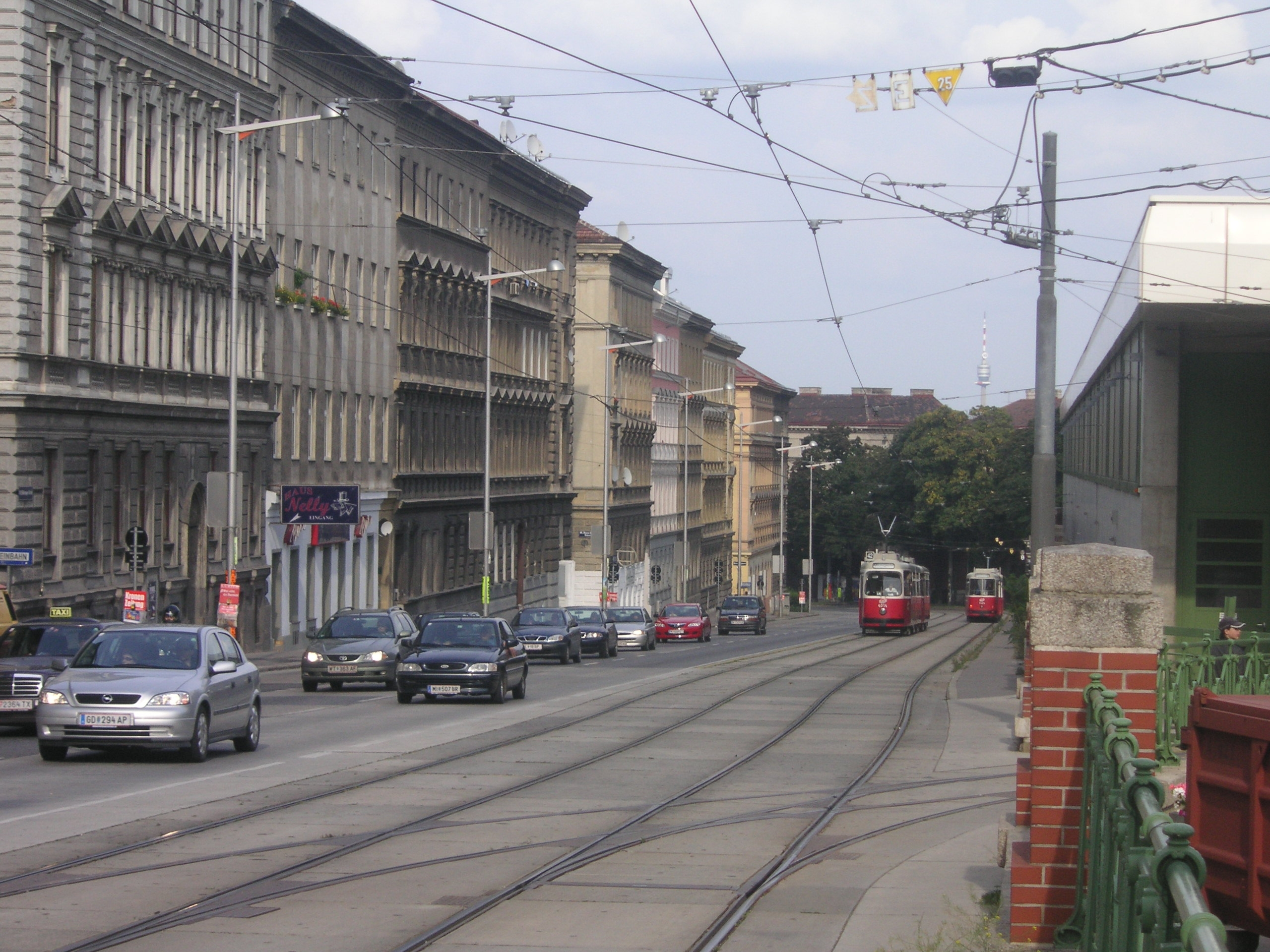
The Währinger Gürtel close to Vienna's General Hospital (Allgemeines Krankenhaus). To the left is Währing, Vienna's 18th district.

The Gürtel (German: [ˈɡʏʁtl̩] lit. 'Belt') is a substantial beltway of Vienna. Running 13.1 km (8.1 mi) parallel to the famous Vienna Ring Road, it encompasses the inner city districts (Innenbezirke) and follows the route of the former Linienwall outer fortification. The city's red-light district is situated around the Gürtel.

== History ==
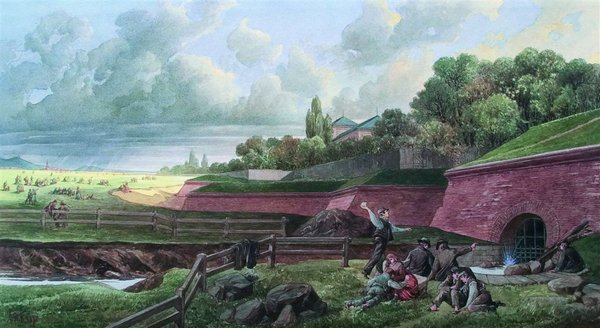
Painting of the Linienwall fortification (by August Stefan Kronstein)

The Gürtel was laid out from 1873 at the site of the former Linienwall fortification, built under Emperor Leopold I at the beginning of the 18th century to protect his residence from kuruc invasions in the course of Rákóczi's War for Independence. After World War I, the road became the construction site for several public housing estates (Gemeindebauten) in the era of Red Vienna. As in most parts of Austria-Hungary, vehicles formerly moved on the left, like in Britain, until after the Anschluss in 1938. According to German regulations, traffic in Vienna was redirected to pass on the right as elsewhere on the Continent. Plans developed in the 1960s and 70s to rebuild the Gürtel as a city motorway have never been carried out. The road, like the adjacent residential areas, is however strongly affected by the high traffic volume.

== Layout ==
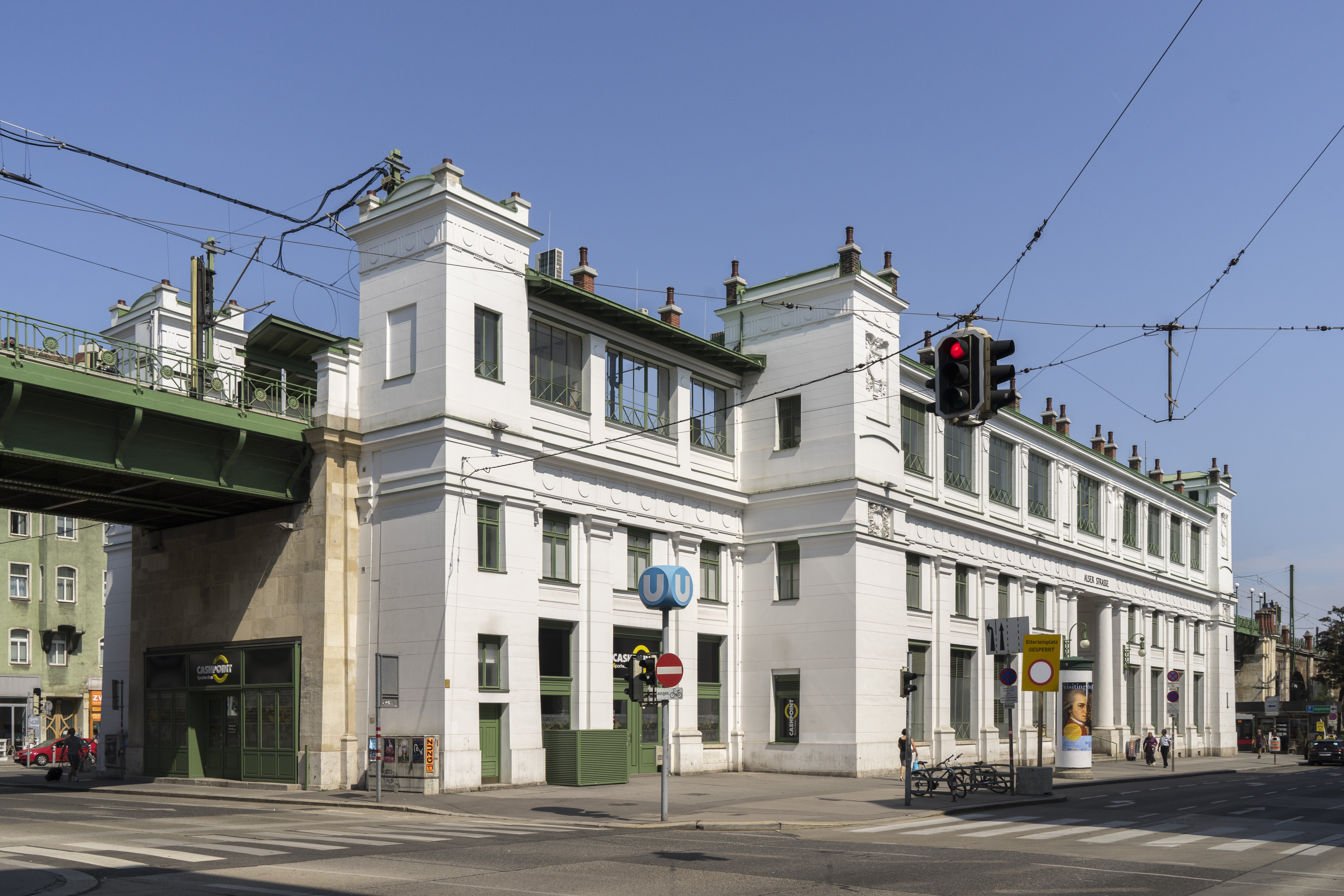
U-Bahn station Alser Straße at Hernalser Gürtel, seen towards the north

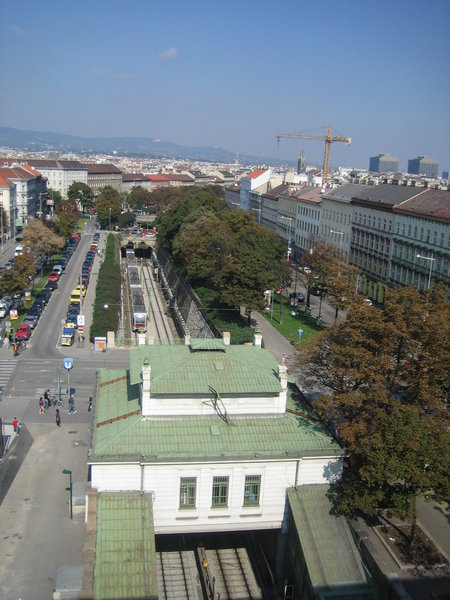
Burggasse-Stadthalle station of the U6 line, towards the north

The Gürtel is not to be confused with B 221 Wiener Gürtel Straße, which includes other streets like Schlachthausgasse, starts at the Donaukanal and ends at the Gürtelbrücke, again at the Donaukanal.

In the south it starts in the Landstraße district, at the junction with A23 Südosttangente and runs westward toward the Central Station, where the Vienna Pre-metro has been built under surface. There the Wiedner Gürtel and Margaretengürtel mark the border of Wieden and Margareten with the southern Favoriten suburb. The Gürtel then turns north, running along the eastern rim of the Meidling suburb, crossing the Wienfluss and the Wienzeile road, separating the inner city districts of Mariahilf and Neubau in the east from Rudolfsheim-Fünfhaus with the Westbahnhof. The road continues as the border of Josefstadt and Alsergrund with the outer Hernals and Währing districts, passing the General Hospital (Allgemeines Krankenhaus, AKH) and the Volksoper. It ends relatively unspectacular in Döbling district at a Gemeindebau from the 1920s called Professor-Jodl-Hof

From the Wienzeile to the northern end, the dual carriageway is accompanied by the historic Stadtbahn viaduct designed by Otto Wagner, today operated by the U6 U-Bahn line.
