= Hagen im Bremischen =

- Municipality
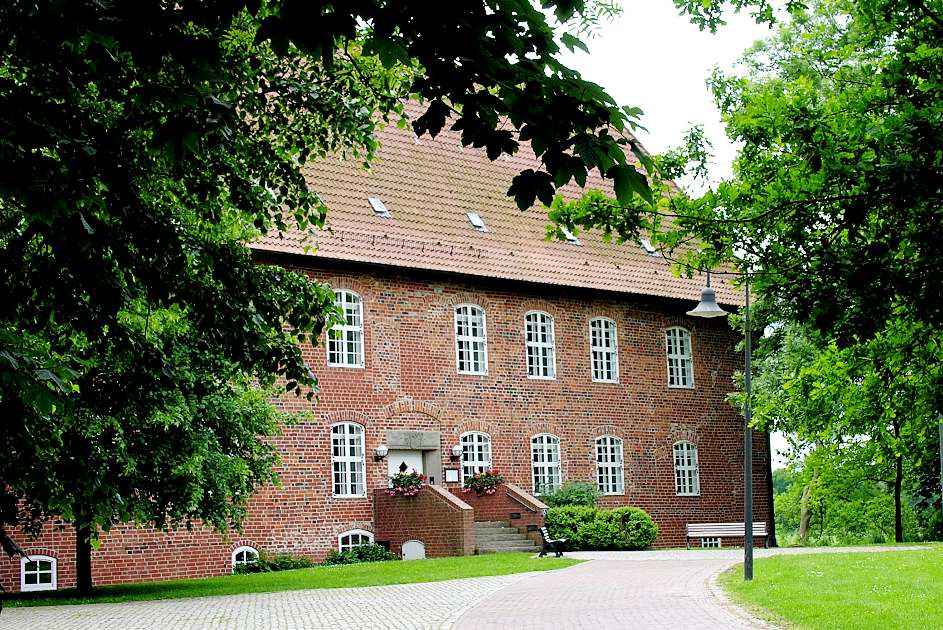
- The formerly prince-archiepiscopal castle Burg zu Hagen

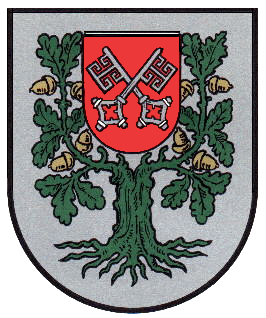
- Flag Coat of arms

- Location of Hagen im Bremischen within Cuxhaven district
- Interactive map of Hagen im Bremischen
- Location within Germany Location within Lower Saxony
- Coordinates: 53°22′N 08°39′E
- Country: Germany
- State: Lower Saxony
- District: Cuxhaven
- Municipal assoc.: Hagen

Government
  - Mayor (2021–26): Andreas Wittenberg

Area
  - Total: 197.43 km^{2} (76.23 sq mi)
- Elevation: 14 m (46 ft)

Population (2025-12-31)
  - Total: 10,792
  - Density: 54.662/km^{2} (141.57/sq mi)
- Time zone: UTC+01:00 (CET)
  - Summer (DST): UTC+02:00 (CEST)
- Postal codes: 27628
- Dialling codes: 04746
- Vehicle registration: CUX

Hagen im Bremischen (German pronunciation: [ˈhaːɡn̩ ʔɪm ˈbʁeːmɪʃn̩]) is a municipality in the district of Cuxhaven, in Lower Saxony, Germany. It is situated approximately 20 km south of Bremerhaven, and 35 km northwest of Bremen. Hagen was the seat of the former Samtgemeinde ("collective municipality") Hagen.

== History ==
Hagen im Bremischen belonged to the Prince-Archbishopric of Bremen, established as a territory of imperial immediacy in 1180. The prince-archiepiscopal fortress (Latin: Castrum Hagen, German: Burghagen) dates back to the 12th century, probably Prince-Archbishop Hartwig II initiated its construction. Since the 14th century the fortress has also been used as a residential castle by the Bremian prince-archbishops. The present structure was formed between 1502 and 1507 by Prince-Archbishop Johann Rode. In the mid-16th century the inhabitants adopted Lutheranism. During the Leaguist occupation under Tilly (1628–1630), they suffered from attempts of reCatholicisation.

In 1648 the Prince-Archbishopric was transformed into the Duchy of Bremen, which was first ruled in personal union by the Swedish crown – interrupted by a Danish occupation (1712–1715) – and from 1715 on by the House of Hanover. In 1807 the ephemeric Kingdom of Westphalia annexed the Duchy, before France annexed it in 1810. In 1813 the duchy was restored to the Electorate of Hanover, which – after its upgrade to the Kingdom of Hanover in 1814 – incorporated the duchy in a real union and the ducal territory, including Hagen, became part of the new Stade Region, established in 1823.

== Coat of arms ==
The coat of arms shows an oak, which refers to the place's name Hagen, an antiquated word for forest. The oak bears the coat of arms of the Prince-Archbishopric of Bremen, which refers to the second name element im Bremischen, meaning literally in the Bremian (country). The Bremian coat of arms displays two argent (silver) crisscrossed keys on a gules (red) background. The key is the epithet symbol of Simon Petrus, the patron saint of Bremen Cathedral. A single key is also the main element in the coat of arms of the city state of Bremen (see Coat of arms of Bremen) and of the formerly Bremian city of Stade.
