= 1211 =

1211 in various calendars
- Gregorian calendar: 1211; MCCXI
- Ab urbe condita: 1964
- Armenian calendar: 660; ԹՎ ՈԿ
- Assyrian calendar: 5961
- Balinese saka calendar: 1132–1133
- Bengali calendar: 617–618
- Berber calendar: 2161
- English Regnal year: 12 Joh. 1 – 13 Joh. 1
- Buddhist calendar: 1755
- Burmese calendar: 573
- Byzantine calendar: 6719–6720
- Chinese calendar: 庚午年 (Metal Horse); 3908 or 3701 — to — 辛未年 (Metal Goat); 3909 or 3702
- Coptic calendar: 927–928
- Discordian calendar: 2377
- Ethiopian calendar: 1203–1204
- Hebrew calendar: 4971–4972
- Hindu calendars
- Vikram Samvat: 1267–1268
- Shaka Samvat: 1132–1133
- Kali Yuga: 4311–4312
- Holocene calendar: 11211
- Igbo calendar: 211–212
- Iranian calendar: 589–590
- Islamic calendar: 607–608
- Japanese calendar: Jōgen 5 / Kenryaku 1 (建暦元年)
- Javanese calendar: 1119–1120
- Julian calendar: 1211; MCCXI
- Korean calendar: 3544
- Minguo calendar: 701 before ROC 民前701年
- Nanakshahi calendar: −257
- Thai solar calendar: 1753–1754
- Tibetan calendar: ལྕགས་ཕོ་རྟ་ལོ་ (male Iron-Horse); 1337 or 956 or 184 — to — ལྕགས་མོ་ལུག་ལོ་ (female Iron-Sheep); 1338 or 957 or 185

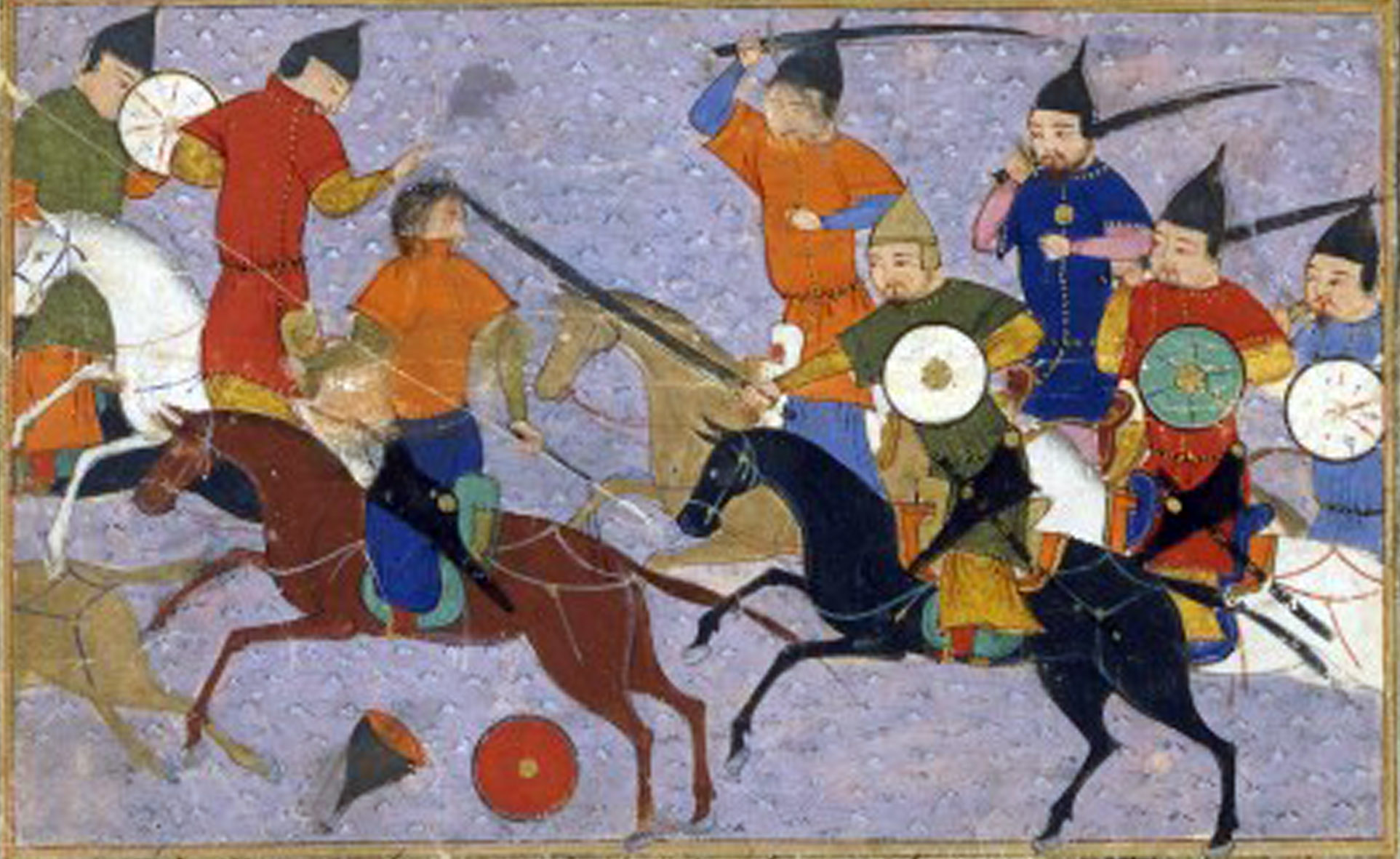
An illustration of the Battle of Yehuling.

Year 1211 (MCCXI) was a common year starting on Saturday of the Julian calendar.

== Events ==
=== By place ===
==== Byzantine Empire ====
- June 17 – Battle of Antioch on the Meander: Seljuk forces led by Sultan Kaykhusraw I are initially victorious with the Latin mercenary cavalry (some 800 men) bearing the brunt of the casualties due to their flanking charge; exhausted by the effort in their attack, the Latin army under Emperor Theodore I Laskaris is struck in the flank and rear by the Seljuk forces. However, the Seljuks stop the fight in order to plunder the Latin camp – which allows Theodore's forces to rally and counter-attack the now disorganized Turks. Meanwhile, Kaykhusraw seeks out Theodore and engages him in single combat, but he is unhorsed and beheaded. The Seljuks are routed and the former Byzantine emperor Alexios III Angelos, Theodore's father-in-law, is captured and imprisoned, ending his days in enforced monastic seclusion.
- October 15 – Battle of the Rhyndacus: Latin emperor Henry of Flanders lands with an expeditionary force (some 3,000 men) at Pegai, and marches eastwards to the Rhyndacus River. The Byzantine army (much larger in force overall) under Theodore I prepare an ambush, but Henry assaults his positions along the river and defeats the Byzantine army in a day-long battle. Henry marches unopposed through the remaining Byzantine lands, reaching south as far as Nymphaion.

==== Mongol Empire ====
- Spring – Genghis Khan summons his Mongol chieftains, and prepares to wage war against the Jurchen-led Jin dynasty in northern China. He advances across the Gobi Desert with a massive army of 100,000 warriors with 300,000 horses, strung out in perhaps 10–20 groups of 5,000–10,000 men each, each with camel-drawn carts, and all linked by fast-moving messengers. Meanwhile, the Jin Government mobilizes an army of 800,000 men, most of which are untrained peasants with low morale, and some 150,000 highly-trained cavalry. This vast army, however, is spread across the Great Wall, and garrisoned separate fortresses.
- Battle of Yehuling: Genghis Khan bypasses the Great Wall with little opposition, and splits his forces into two armies. The main army (60,000 men) is led by himself, and the other army is taken by his son Ögedei to attack the city of Datong. Genghis heads for the strategic Juyong Pass ("Young Badger's Mouth") – which leads down to the capital of Zhongdu (modern-day Beijing), but along the way he is halted at the pass of Yehuling where the bulk of the Jin army awaits him. Between March and October, the battle is fought in three stages, after Genghis has defeated the Jin forces, he begins raiding the countryside before he withdraws for the winter.

==== Europe ====
- Spring – Albigensian Crusade: Crusader forces led by Simon de Montfort conquer Toulouse and besiege Lavaur in southern France. On May 3, the city is retaken; on orders of Montfort the senior knights are hanged and some 400 Cathars are burned alive.
- March 26 – King Sancho I of Portugal ("the Populator") dies after a 25-year reign at Coimbra. He is succeeded by his son Afonso II ("the Fat") as ruler of Portugal. During his reign, he designs the first set of Portuguese written laws.
- Livonian Crusade: Battles of Viljandi and Turaida – The Crusaders fail to conquer the Viljandi stronghold, but manage to baptize Sakala and Ugandi counties (Southern Estonia).
- September – The 16-year-old Frederick II is elected in absentia as German king by rebellious nobleman (supported by Pope Innocent III) at the Diet of Nuremberg (Germany).

==== Britain ====
- Summer – John, King of England ("Lackland") campaigns in Wales against Llywelyn the Great, prince of Gwynedd. In July, after the Welsh uprising, John and Llywelyn reach an agreement and a peace treaty is signed.
- June – Papal legate Pandulf Verraccio arrives in Northampton to serve John with his excommunication ordered by Innocent III. For John this is a serious blow to his ability to rule the country.
- John sends a gift of herrings to nunneries in almost every shire, despite his status as an excommunicant.
- The Papal Interdict of 1208 laid by Innocent III remains in force after John refuses to accept the pope's appointee.

==== Asia ====
- June – Shams ud-Din Iltutmish, son-in-law of the former Sultan Qutb al-Din Aibak, becomes ruler of the Delhi Sultanate and quells the Hindu rebellions in India.

=== By topic ===
==== Religion ====
- April 21 – Santiago de Compostela Cathedral (begun in the 11th century) is consecrated, in the presence of King Alfonso IX of León.
- Archbishop Aubrey (or 'Alberic of Humbert') lays the first stone of the chevet of Reims Cathedral.

== Births ==
- January 20 – Agnes of Prague, Bohemian abbess (d. 1282)
- April 25 – Frederick II, duke of Austria and Styria (d. 1246)
- September 22 – Ibn Khallikan, Barmakid historian (d. 1282)
- December 3 – Francesco Lippi, Italian nobleman (d. 1291)
- Ajall Shams al-Din Omar, Khwarezmian governor (d. 1279)
- Casimir I of Kuyavia, Polish nobleman and knight (d. 1267)
- Eleanor of Portugal, queen consort of Denmark (d. 1231)
- Henry VII, king of Germany (Rex Romanorum) (d. 1242)
- Hugh Bigod, English nobleman and Justiciar (d. 1266)
- John I, Lord of Mecklenburg ("the Theologian"), German nobleman (d. 1264)
- Muhammad III, ruler of the Nizari Ismaili state (d. 1255)
- Prijezda I, Bosnian nobleman (Ban) and knight (d. 1287)
- Shinnyo, Japanese Buddhist nun and writer (d. 1282)
- William of Villehardouin, prince of Achaea (d. 1278)

== Deaths ==
- February 2 – Adelaide of Meissen, duchess of Bohemia
- March 14 – Pietro Gallocia (or Galluzzi), Italian cardinal
- March 26 – Sancho I ("the Populator"), king of Portugal (b. 1154)
- May 16 – Mieszko IV Tanglefoot, duke of Poland (b. 1130)
- June 9 – Andrew II, Baron of Vitré, French nobleman and knight (b. 1150)
- June 17 – Kaykhusraw I, ruler of the Sultanate of Rum
- August 9 – William de Braose, 4th Lord of Bramber, Norman nobleman
- August 18 – Narapatisithu, ruler of the Pagan Kingdom (Burma) (b. 1150)
- October 14 – Ferdinand of Castile, Spanish prince (b. 1189)
- November 29 – Páll Jónsson, Icelandic bishop (b. 1155)
- December 8 – Adelaide of Poland, Polish princess
- December 14 – Shōshi, Japanese empress (b. 1195)
- Abu Musa al-Jazuli, Almohad philologian (b. 1146)
- Alexios III Angelos, Byzantine emperor (b. 1153)
- Euphrosyne Doukaina Kamatera, Byzantine empress
- Hugh I, Sardinian ruler (Judge of Arborea) (b. 1178)
- Peter of Blois, French cleric and diplomat (b. 1130)
- Robert of Thornham, English seneschal and knight
- Roger de Lacy (le Constable), English nobleman (b. 1170)
- Samson of Tottington, English monk and abbot (b. 1135)
- Shizuka Gozen, Japanese court dancer (b. 1165)
- Svyatoslav III Igorevich, Kievan prince (b. 1176)
- Thomas Morosini, Latin patriarch of Constantinople
- Tsangpa Gyare, Tibetan Buddhist leader (b. 1161)
- Urraca of Portugal, queen consort of León (b. 1148)
- Xiang Zong, Chinese emperor of Western Xia (b. 1170)
