= Battle of Otepää =

1217 battle during the Livonian Crusade

Coordinates: 58°03′27″N 26°30′17″E

- Part of the Livonian Crusade
Date	February 1217
Location	Otepää, Estonia
Result	See § Aftermath
Territorial changes	Crusaders were forced to leave Otepää

Belligerents
Livonian Brothers of the Sword; Ugandians; Livs; Letts	Principality of Pskov; Oeselians

Commanders and leaders
Volquin	Vladimir of Pskov

Strength
More than 3,000	c. 20,000

Casualties and losses
Heavy casualties	Low casualties

The Battle of Otepää (Russian: Битва при Оденпе) was a battle during the Livonian Crusade in February 1217. The battle ended in a compromise, with the Russians allowing the Germans to leave the fortress.

== Background ==
In 1216, the Russians of Pskov were outraged that some of the Estonians of Ugaunia accepted Latin Christianity rather than Orthodoxy. The Russians began ravaging the area around the fortress of Odenpäh (Otepää). Some of the Russians were captured, but the Master of the Sword Brothers in Wenden released them. According to the Livonian Chronicle of Henry:

They rose up with the bishop's men and the Brothers of the Militia and went into Russia toward Novgorod. They found that the land had not been secured by any forewarnings. On the feast of Epiphany, when the Russians are accustomed to occupy themselves more with feasting and drinking, they divided their army among all the roads and villages. They killed many people, took captive a great many women, and drove off many horses and flocks. They took much loot and, having avenged their injuries with fire and the sword, they returned rejoicing to Odenpäh with all the loot.

The Germans, who had settled in the fortress, began plundering the land in January 1217, after which Vladimir Mstislavich of Pskov began to lay siege to the fortress.

== Battle ==
In February 1217, a large Russian force from Pskov, along with Oeselians and other Estonians, arrived at Otepää to besiege it. The number of the besiegers is said to have reached 20,000 men. Because the stronghold was located on a very well-defended hill, the siege lasted for 17 days.

Bishop Albert of Riga sent 3,000 men from Riga headed by the master of the order to relieve the trapped German force in Otepää. Near the stronghold they met the Estonian and Russian forces in battle. The Germans managed to get into the stronghold, but with very heavy casualties. The situation became very difficult for them. The long siege decreased the people's food and fodder to the minimum. The horses were said to have eaten the horsetails off each other. On the third day after the German relief army had arrived the stronghold, the negotiations started. Based on the peace they made, the Germans had to leave not only from Otepää, but from all of Estonia. It was the greatest defeat for the Crusaders in the Livonian Crusade to Estonia. Some of the Estonians were baptized in exchange for peace.

== Aftermath ==
The battle ended with a compromise. Both the Russians and Germans faced shortages, so the Germans were allowed to leave the fortress. The Chronicle of Henry of Livonia tells the story of Theoderic, the brother of Albert, who is said to have been tricked and taken away to Novgorod, but it is possible that the peace terms included him being taken hostage, given that Chronicle states the emissaries of Albert went "to Novgorod and to Saccala to confirm the peace made at Odenpäh and also to ask them for his brother Theoderic".

== Sources ==
- Murray, Alan V. (5 December 2016). The Clash of Cultures on the Medieval Baltic Frontier. Routledge. ISBN 978-1-351-89260-5.
