= Ako (ruler) =

Livonian ruler (died 1206)

- Livonian Ruler
- Reign: 1203 - 1206
- Successor: Caupo
- Born: 12th century
- Died: June 4, 1206; Salaspils, Latvia
- Religion: Paganism

Ako (Swedish: Ake, Åke, Danish: Aage, German: Ago) was a Livonian ruler and elder of Livonian Daugava from modern-day Salaspils who fought during the Livonian Crusade against the German crusaders and the Livonian Brothers of the Sword in the beginning of the 13th century. On June 4, 1206, Ako died during the Battle of Salaspils, and his head was brought to Riga for Albert of Riga as a symbol of victory.

== Military history ==
=== 1203 Rebellion in Daugava and Turaida ===
In 1203 Ako started a rebellion against the Livonian Brothers of the Sword located in Livonian Daugava and Turaida, and asked for help for Vladimir, the prince of Polotsk and the Lithuanians. Ako's plans failed, however, and the Germans, with help from Caupo, defeated the natives of Turaida and Daugava. Because the prince of Polotsk didn't arrive on time, the Livonianelders were thrown into shackles in Riga Castle, villages were burned, fields and crops were destroyed, and any inhabitants who did not escape were killed.

=== Battle of Salaspils (1206) ===
The Battle of Salaspils started on June 4, 1206. Ako (with soldiers from Salaspils, Turaida and Lithuania) fought against Albert of Riga (with soldiers from Teutonic Order, Livonian Brothers of the Sword and Christianized Livonians). Ako and his army gathered in the Salaspils Castle. Albert of Riga attacked the castle with about 150 soldiers and ultimately won, capturing Salaspils and killing Ako.

== Structures for Ako ==
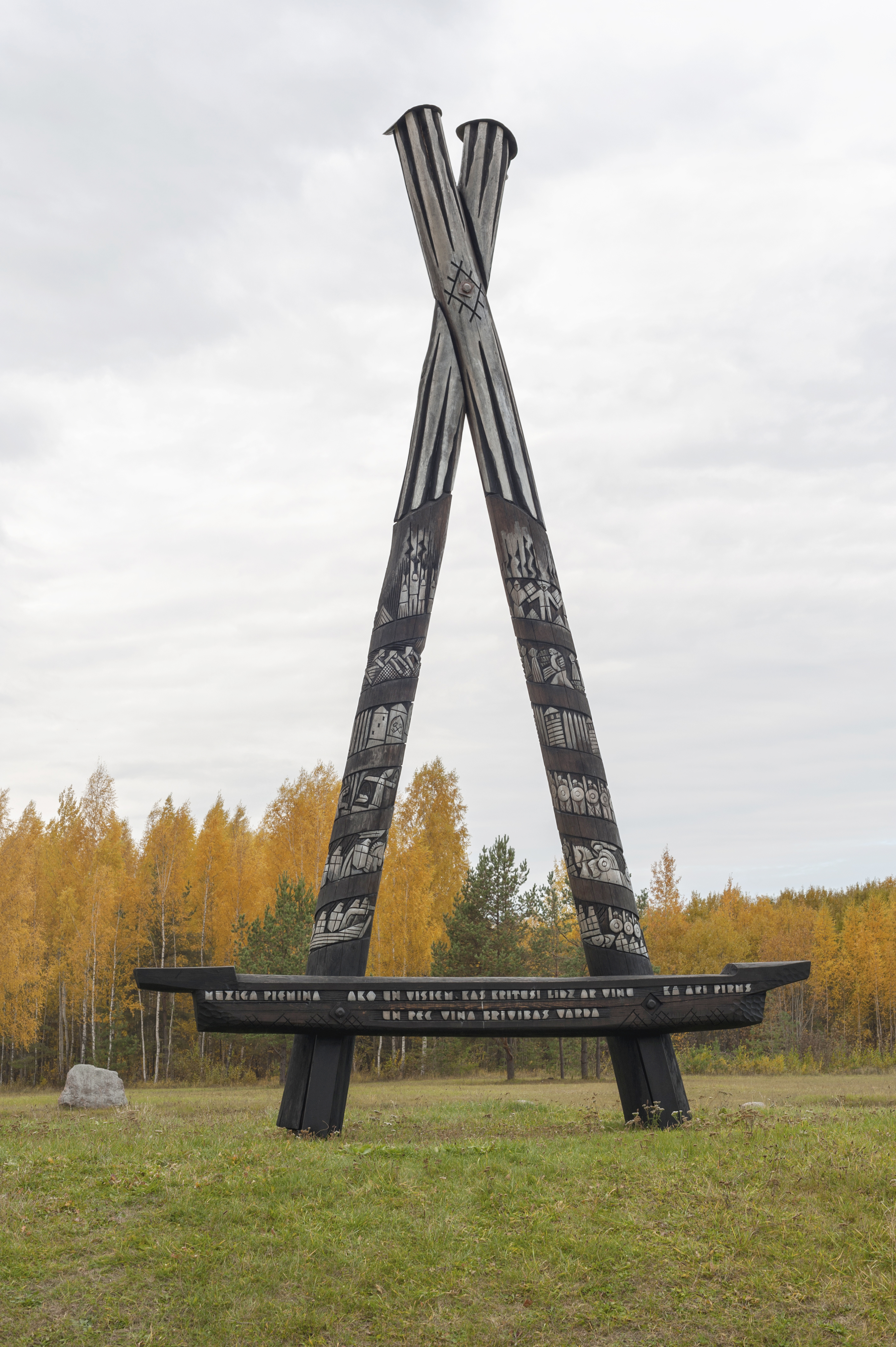
The Memorial Monument in Salaspils

=== Ako's head ===
In 1852 (646 years after Ako's death) it was reported that in the fall of 1851, a stone covered in moss was discovered in Salaspils and was about 98 cm high and weighed around 780 kg. Stonemason Pauls Ádolfs Häke (1817–1867) bought it from a farmer because he wanted to use it as a tombstone. When cleaning the rock, he realized that it was artificially shaped as a face having eyes, eyebrows, a nose, a mouth with the corners of the lips turned down. Later that year the stonemason donated the rock to a museum.

In 1926, a photo appeared on a magazine "The Sun of Latvia" (Latvian: "Latvijas Saule") with a note saying the rock was buried in the courtyard of the Dom. 74 years later, in the fall of 2000, the rock was dug up and placed cross aisle of the Dom. In 2004, a copy of the rock was made by Ģirts Burvis and installed in Livonian Square, Riga.

=== Ako's monument ===
A memorial monument for Ako was arranged in 1994, also created by Ģirts Burvis. The monument, located in Mārtiņsala, commemorates the Livonians who fought during the Battle of Salaspils, since the island was a significant place for the Livonians around the 10th - 13th century.

The monument was reconstructed in 2013 and the landscape design of the territory was established in 2014. Near the monument are information stands about the history of the river before the construction of the Riga Hydroelectric Power Plant.

== Origin of Ako's name ==
A Danish King called Aki occurs in both the Icelandic text of Egil's Saga and the 12th century historical chronicle of the Gesta Danorum. It is speculated that Ako's name could have originated from these.

== See also ==
- Livonian Crusade
- Livonian Chronicle of Henry
- Livonians
