= Battle of Ümera =

Battle

- Part of Livonian crusade
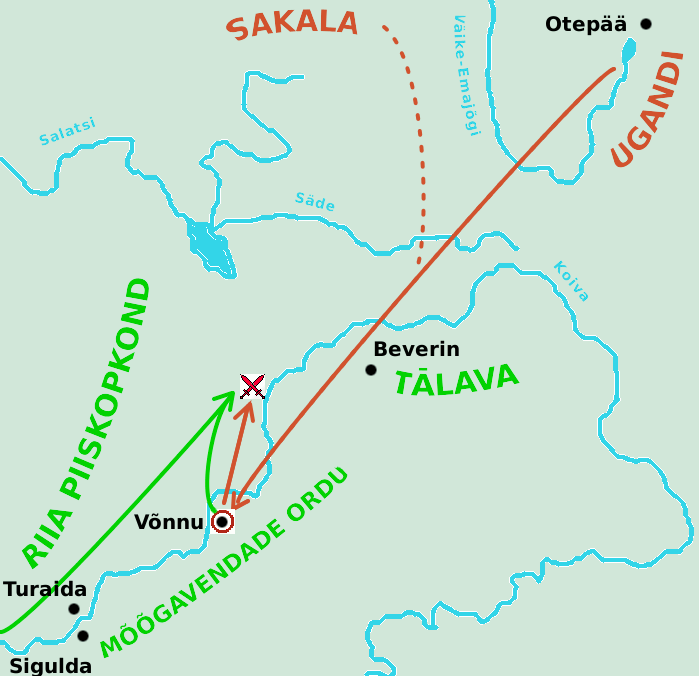
- Map of the landscape
Date	August or September 1210
Location	Jumara River, Latvia 57°30′N 25°25′E
Result	Estonian victory

Belligerents
Brothers of the Sword; Livonians; Latgalians	Estonians

Commanders and leaders
Arnold; Caupo of Turaida; Bertold †; Wane †	Unknown

Strength
500–1,000 (including 200 Germans, about 20 of them knights)	500–1,000

Casualties and losses
100+ casualties	Unknown

Battle of Ümera (Estonian: Ümera lahing), also known as the Battle of Imera (Latvian: Kauja pie Imeras), was a battle during the Livonian Crusade between the Livonian Brothers of the Sword, their Christian Livonian and Latgalian allies, and the Estonians. The Battle was fought near the Jumara, a tributary of the Gauja River in August or September 1210.

== Battle ==
=== Order of Battle ===
The Crusaders were the led by the Livonian Brothers of the Sword, whose leader was Landmarschall Arnold. Caupo of Turaida was the leader of the Christian Livonians, and the leader of the Christian Latgalians is unknown. The military vanguard consisted entirely of members of the Livonian Brothers of the Sword, and consisted of around twenty soldiers. Estonian leadership is entirely unknown.

=== Background ===
Following the Estonian retreat after their failed siege at Cēsis, which was controlled by the Wends and Brothers of the Sword. Caupo of Turaida and the Brothers of the Sword decided to mostly abandon the garrison and follow the retreating Estonian forces, who had crossed the Jumara. The Crusaders decided to wait for reinforcements before engaging the Estonians, however grew impatient and decided to attack. The Estonian forces had set up an ambush at its tributary and were hiding in the forests.

=== Battle ===
The Crusaders decided to cross the Jumara after having believed that the Estonians were fleeing in haste, however were either attacked, or were demanded to surrender by the Estonians after having been surrounded and encircled. The Brothers of the Sword attempted to break free from the encirclement by force, fighting their way out of the encirclement, the Christian Latgalians and Livonians followed suit, however around one-hundred of them were captured by the Estonians.

The losses the Crusaders faced could have been much greater in reality than mentioned by Henry of Latvia. The Estonian victory over the Crusaders was a significant morale boost, as messages were sent to all counties with a promise to be as "one heart and one soul against the Christian name".

According to the Livonian Chronicle, some of the prisoners were immediately executed, while others were burned alive and some had crosses carved on their backs with swords, before being executed as well.
