= Battle of Cēsis (1210) =

1211 military conflict in Latvia during Livonian Crusade

- Part of the Livonian Crusade
Date	1210
Location	Cēsis, Latvia 57°18′48″N 25°16′12″E
Result	Livonian Victory

Belligerents
Sword Brethren, vends Livonians; Latgalians from Tālava	Counties of Ancient Estonia

Commanders and leaders
Caupo of Turaida	Unknown

Strength
Unknown	Unknown

Casualties and losses
Unknown	Unknown

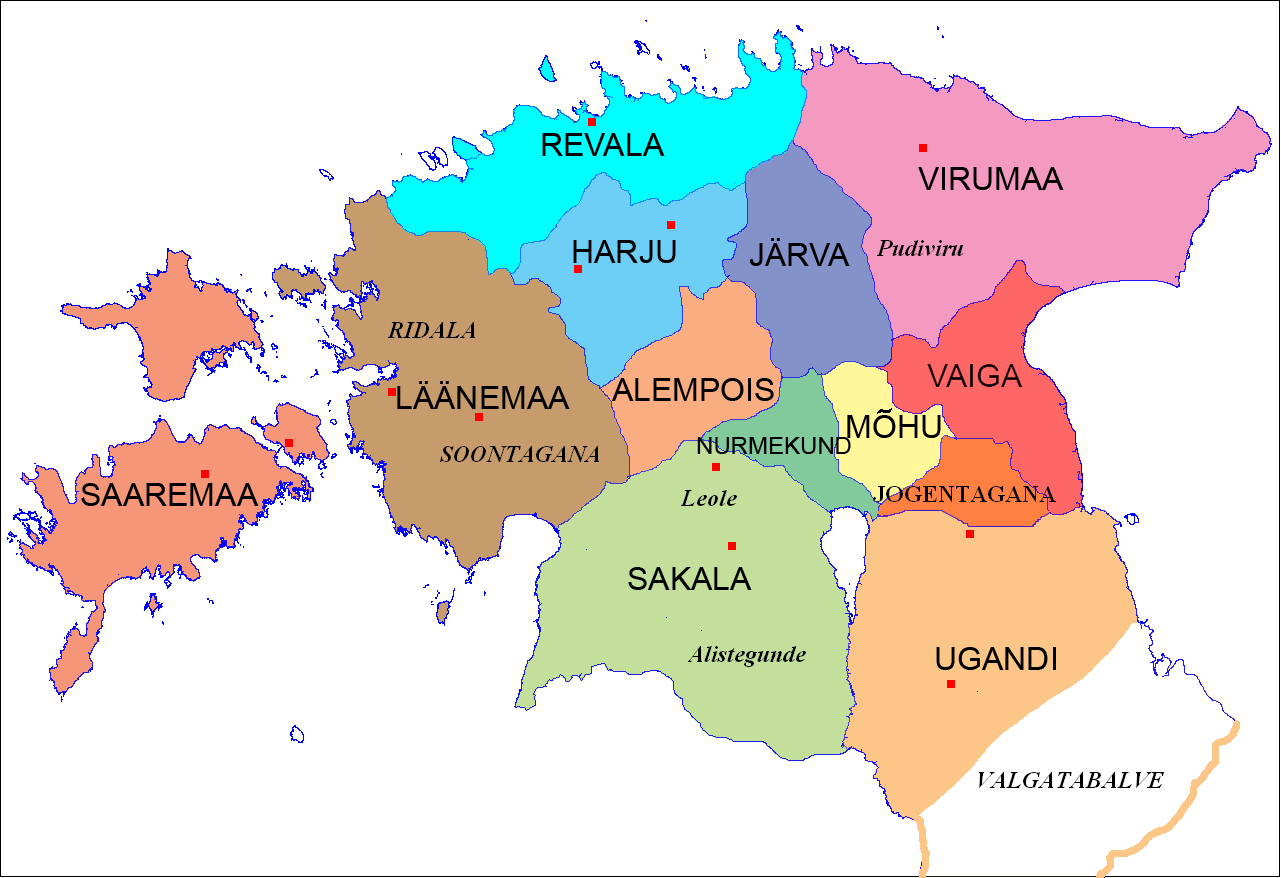
Map of Ancient Estonia

The Battle of Cēsis was fought between native Estonian forces and the Germanic knights (known as the Livonian Brothers of the Sword) and their allies during the Livonian Crusade.

In 1210 the Estonian counties launched several raids on the strongholds in Latvia, guarded by the Sword Brethren. Many Estonian troops besieged the stronghold of Cēsis, which had become an important strongpoint for the Livonian Order. The Estonians attempted to set the stronghold on fire by building a large turret. Attacked from above and below, the defenders were put in a difficult situation. The stronghold was under siege for three days and the defenders probably wouldn't have been able to keep defending it, if on the fourth day the besiegers hadn't unexpectedly left. The Estonians had received a message from their scouts that numerous enemy troops led by Caupo of Turaida were heading towards Cēsis to relieve the army trapped inside the stronghold. Without waiting for the whole relief army, the besieged troops began chasing the retreating Estonian army with some of the newly arrived Livonians and Latgalians.
