= Battle of Muhu =

1227 military conflict in Estonia during Livonian Crusade

- Part of the Livonian Crusade
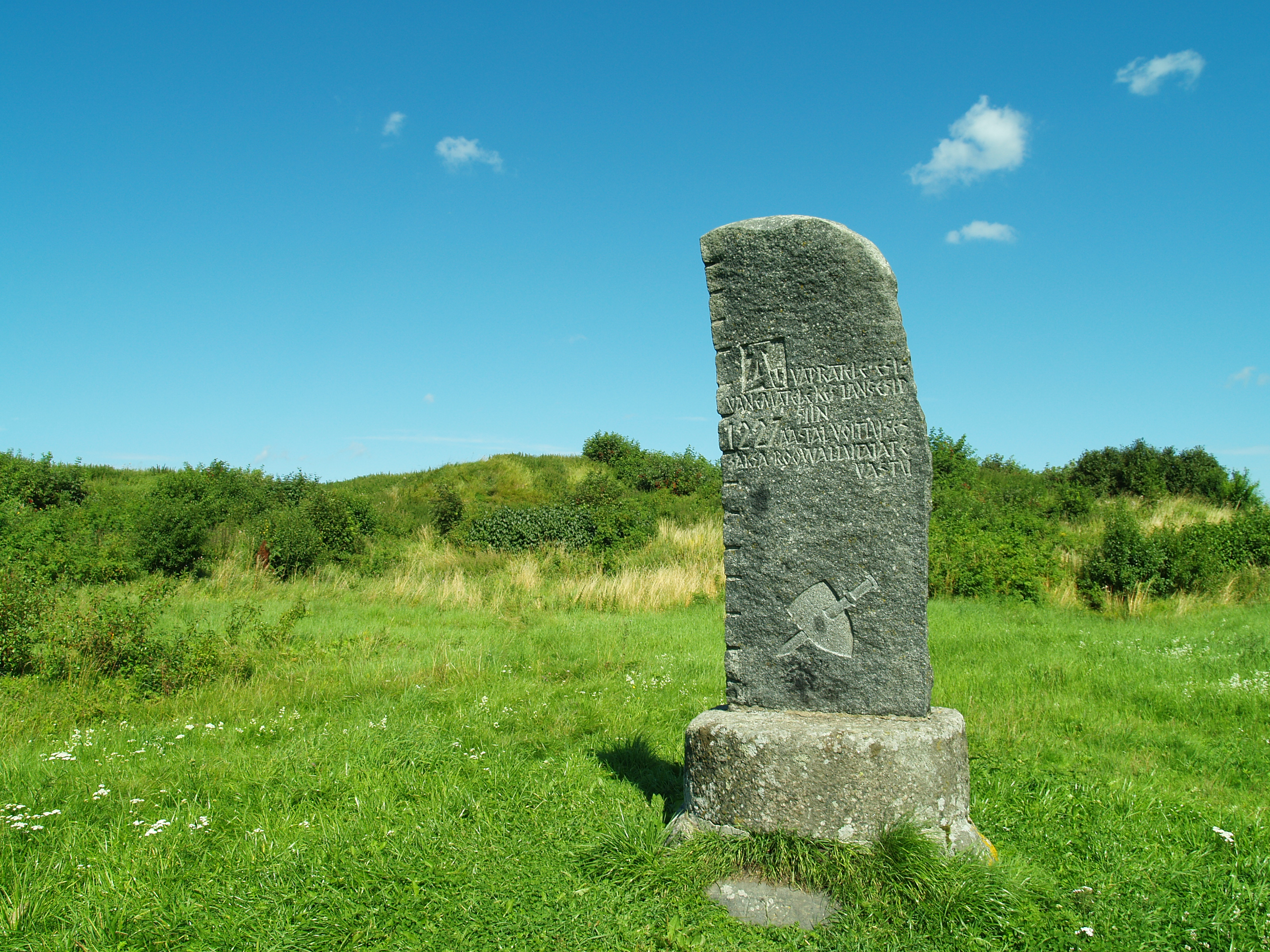
- Monument in the center of the Muhu Stronghold
Date	January 1227
Location	Muhu, Estonia 58°34′57″N 23°10′24″E
Result	Crusaders victory

Belligerents
Oeselians	Sword-Brothers, baptized Estonians, Livs and Letts

Commanders and leaders
Unknown	Bishop Albert of Riga, Volquin, Bishop Lambert of Semigallia

Strength
Unknown	20,000

Casualties and losses
Heavy casualties	Low casualties

The Battle of Muhu was a military engagement fought between a force of Baltic and Germanic crusaders and pagan Oeselians. The battle, fought in Muhu, Estonia, resulted in the crusaders storming and capturing a fortress held by the Oeselians.

== History ==
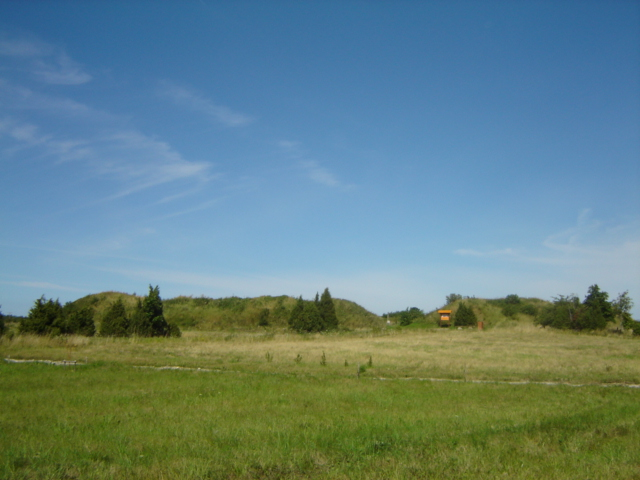
Remains of the Muhu stronghold

In January 1227, when the sea had frozen hard, a large Crusader army was gathered after the call of the Papal legate William of Modena. According to the Chronicle of Livonia, 20,000 troops had set out for Muhu from the estuary of Pärnu River and moved along the ice. Since the ice was said to have been very slippery, they reached the stronghold of Muhu on the ninth day. After seeing such a large force, the people of Muhu offered a truce and allowed themselves to be baptised. Most of the Germans didn't accept it and so they started besieging the stronghold. The first attack was fended off with rocks and spears. The besiegers threw rocks into the stronghold with bricoles, built a turret, and undermined the wall.

On the sixth day the Livonian army managed to break into the stronghold, where a ferocious slaughter took place. The wealth of the settlement, horses and bovines were looted, and the stronghold itself was burned down.
