= Battle of Riga =

The Battle of Riga may refer to:

- Battle of Riga (1203), an engagement of the Livonian Crusade
- Battle of Riga (1215), an engagement of the Livonian Crusade
- Battle of the Gulf of Riga (1915), a naval battle of World War I
- Battle of Riga (1917), a land battle of the World War I
  - Battle of Jugla, one part of the 1917 battle
- Battle of Riga (1919) during the Latvian War of Independence

== See also ==
- Riga Offensive (1944), a Red Army offensive which drove the German army from Riga in World War II
