= Battle of Viljandi =

1211 military conflict in Estonia during Livonian Crusade

Coordinates: 58°21′34″N 25°35′46″E

Date	1211
Location	Viljandi, Estonia
Result	Livonian victory

Belligerents
Brothers of the Sword; Livs; Latgalians	Estonians

Commanders and leaders
Engelbert von Thiesenhusen; Berthold of Wenden; Arnold †; Caupo of Turaida; Rūsiņš	Lembitu of Lehola; Meeme

Strength
Unknown	Unknown

Casualties and losses
Medium casualties	Heavy casualties

The Battle of Viljandi was a battle during the Livonian Crusade in 1211 in Viljandi, Estonia. The battle ended with no decisive victory for the invaders as they were unable to take the stronghold. They did however, manage to baptise the people inside the stronghold.

In spring 1211, a larger objective for the Livonian Brothers of the Sword was to take the stronghold of Viljandi. They plundered the neighbourhood, robbed their food supplies, and killed and kidnapped the villagers who were staying in the villages nearby. Some of the prisoners were brought in front of the stronghold where they were killed to frighten the defenders, before being cast off into the moat.

In the first collision in front of the stronghold gate, the defenders managed to fend off with heavy casualties the attackers and equip themselves with the enemy's equipment. The besiegers built a turret, the moat was filled with wood and the turret was rolled onto it. From there they threw spears and crossbowmen fired upon the defenders. The Estonians also tried to light the turret. It was here the Germans first used a bricole on Estonian soil. With the bricole they threw rocks into the stronghold day and night, inflicting relatively serious damage. Soon the invaders managed to break one of the fortifications, but behind it there was another. Also, the Estonians were able to put out the fires lit on parts of the stronghold.

Unable to take the stronghold in five days, the invaders started negotiating on the sixth day. Because there was a lack of water, many wounded and killed in the stronghold, the elders were willing to make peace with the besiegers. They allowed only the priests inside the stronghold, who were said to have sprinkled holy water on the stronghold, houses, men, and women. Massive baptism didn't occur, it was deferred because of "very enormous bloodspilling". Having sons of elders and noblemen as hostages, the German army retreated.

A second battle would occur at the same site several years later on 29 January, 1223. There, the Estonians were victorious over the Livonian Brothers of the Sword.
