= Battle of Turaida (1211) =

1211 military conflict in Latvia during Livonian Crusade

Livonian Crusade
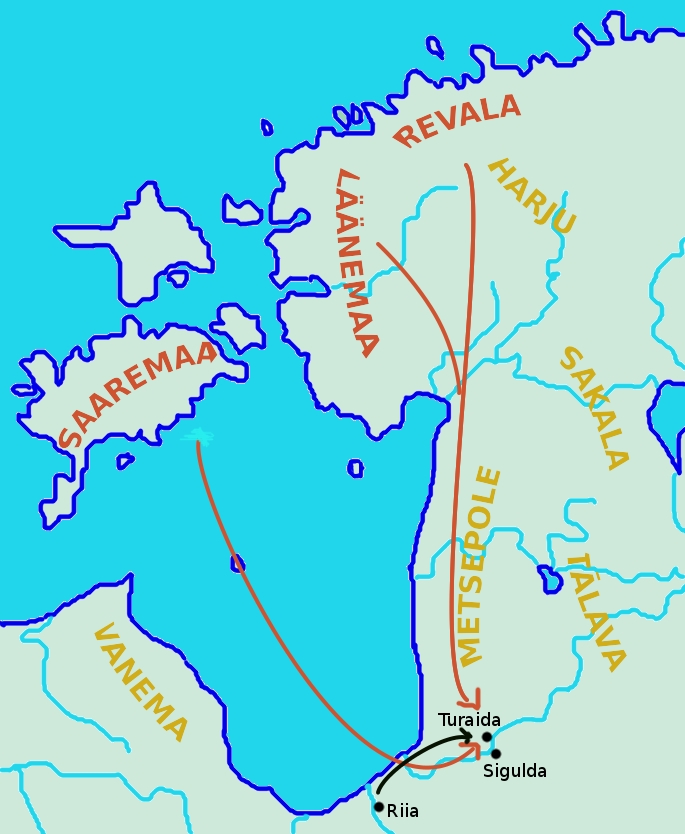
Date	1211
Location	Turaida, Latvia 57°11′00″N 24°51′00″E
Result	Livonian victory

Belligerents
Sword-Brothers; Livonians	Oeselians and other Estonians

Commanders and leaders
Bernhard of Lippe	Unknown

Strength
Unknown	More than 300 battle ships, several thousands of warriors,

Casualties and losses
Low casualties	2,000 killed

Battle of Turaida was one of the biggest battles of Livonian crusade between Estonian tribes and Livonian Brothers of the Sword. The battle took place around modern Turaida, Latvia.

== Battle ==
By summer of 1211, a larger military plan had been made by Estonian counties whose objective was to capture the stronghold held by Caupo of Turaida and thereafter attack Riga. Estonian troops from the mainland and the Oeselian fleet arrived accordingly on an appointed date at the stronghold of Turaida. The stronghold was surrounded and the attack began. The besiegers promised to keep attacking until they either took the stronghold or the Livs inside agreed to join the Estonians for the attack on Riga.

Soon after, a large Crusader reinforcement army arrived from Riga with whom a fierce battle began. The Livonian and German crossbowmen from the stronghold also charged out to join the attack. The Estonian forces were caught between two enemy forces, which made them fall back. They regrouped on a hill between the stronghold and the Gauja river. The battle lasted from morning to night, and eventually the Estonians were forced to surrender and agree to being baptized. At night, however, they secretly tried to escape to the sea along the Gauja using their ships. Unfortunately for them, the Germans had built a bridge with towers on the river, where they fired upon the fleeing Estonians with spears and arrows. The next night the Oeselians left their ships and broke away using the roads on the mainland.

The Estonian losses were heavy, which was further elaborated in the Chronicle of Livonia. Approximately 2,000 were killed with nearly the same amount of captured horses and over 300 ships captured as well. These are most likely exaggerations.

== See also ==
- Battle of Turaida
