= Vends =

Baltic tribe

The Vends (Latin: wendi; Latvian: vendi; Estonian: võndlased, võnnulased, vendid) were a Balto-Finnic people that lived between the 12th to 16th centuries in the area around the town of Wenden (now Cēsis) in present-day north-central Latvia.

According to the Livonian Chronicle of Henry, prior to their arrival in the area of Wenden in the 12th century, the Vends were settled in Ventava county (Latin: Wynda) by the Venta River near the present city of Ventspils in western Latvia. Their proximity to more numerous Finnic and Baltic tribes inclined the Vends to ally with the German crusaders, who began building a stone castle near the older Vendian wooden fortress in 1207. The castle of Wenden later became the residence of the Master of the Livonian Order. The last known record of the Vends' existence as a distinct entity dates from the sixteenth century.

== Origin ==
Henry of Latvia made the first surviving mention of the Vends as they were chased away from Courland and Christianized by Germans during Livonian Crusade of 1198–1290. Traditionally, researchers believe that Vends spoke a Finnic language and were related to the neighboring Livonians. They are sometimes associated with the Western Slavic Wends.

== Legacy ==
Vends may have a connection with the national flag of Latvia. The Livonian Rhymed Chronicle (Livländische Reimchronik) states that in 1290 when the local militia was recruited to defend Riga, they came from Wenden with "a Latvian red banner crossed by white, in the manner of the Vends/of the Wenden" (nâch wendischen siten).

== See also ==
- Vistula Veneti
- Wends
- Lechites
