= Siege of Tallinn =

1221 military conflict in Estonia during Livonian Crusade

- Part of the Livonian Crusade
Date	1221
Location	Tallinn, Estonia 59°26′14″N 24°44′42″E
Result	Danish victory

Belligerents
Estonians	Denmark

Commanders and leaders
Unknown	Unknown

Strength
Unknown	Unknown

Casualties and losses
Unknown	Unknown

Victory over the Swedish army in the Battle of Lihula inspired the Oeselians to further fight. In 1221 they tried to conquer the Danish stronghold in Tallinn with the help of Revalians, Harrians, and Vironians. They besieged the stronghold for 14 days and all Danish outbreaks were repulsed. One day, four cogs appeared unexpectedly, which the Oeselians thought to have been carrying the Royal Army of the Danish king. The siege was ended and the Oeselians left.
