= Lembitu =

Estonian elder (died 1217)

- Elder of Sakala
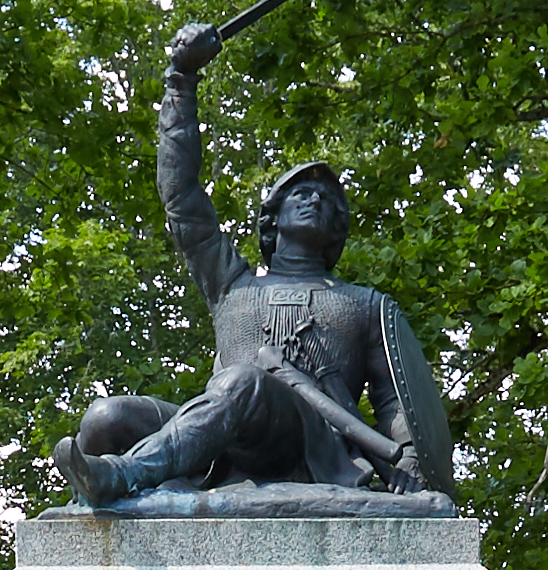
- Monument to Lembitu at Suure-Jaani, Estonia.
- Reign: Until 21 September 1217
- Successor: Unnepewe, his brother
- Born: 12th century
- Died: 21 September 1217; Near Viljandi
- Issue: One or several sons

Lembitu (Estonian also: Lembit, died 21 September 1217) was an ancient Estonian senior (elder) from Sakala County and military leader in the struggle against conquest of the Estonian lands by the German Livonian Brothers of the Sword at the beginning of the 13th century. He is the only Estonian pre-Crusade ruler, about whom some biographical information is known (he is mentioned only in the Livonian Chronicle of Henry).

Lembitu, also referred to in Latin as Lambite, Lembito or Lembitus, was first mentioned in chronicles in 1211. Troops led by Lembitu destroyed a troop of missionaries in the historical Estonian county of Sakala (Sackalia) and made a raid as far as Pskov, then a town of the Novgorod Republic. In 1215, Lembitu's Lehola (Leal) stronghold (situated near the present town of Suure-Jaani) was taken by Germans and Lembitu was taken prisoner. He was released in 1217.

Lembitu attempted to unite the Estonians in order to withstand the German conquest. He managed to assemble an army of 6,000 Estonian men from different counties, but was killed in the following Battle of St. Matthew's Day in September 1217.

== Title and degree of power ==
The only written biographical information about Lembit comes from the Livonian Chronicle of Henry, where he is described as "senior" ("elder") and "princeps ac senior perfidus Lembitus" ("perfidious prince and elder Lembitu"). In another place the chronicle speaks of "Lambito et Meme, seniores de Sackale" (Lembuto and Meme, elders of Sakala), i.e., Lembitu was not the only elder of the county, thus precluding some interpretations of Lembitu's title as "king of Sakala" or "the elder of Sakala". Modern archaeological evidence suggests that Sakala was a traditional/cultural region rather than an administrative unit. Also, there is no evidence of a power level higher than the parish (kihelkond) elder.

== Searching the skull of Lembitu in Poland ==
There are rumors that Lembitu's skull might reside in a Polish museum. During the 1970s, a group of Polish students visiting Estonia spoke of a museum home to the skull of an "Estonian king" with the description "Rex Estorum". In 2017, Estonia and Poland began to search for this skull, but this has been a time-consuming process, as the country is home to over 5,000 museums.

== See also ==
- Caupo of Turaida
- Livonian Crusade
- Rulers of Estonia
- Sakala/Sackalia
- Vetseke
