= Battle of Riga (1215) =

Estonian attempt to repel Livonian forces

- Part of the Livonian Crusade
Date	1215
Location	Riga (Latvia) 57°03′00″N 24°03′00″E
Result	Livonian victory

Belligerents
Sword-Brothers, Livs and Letts	Oeselians and other Estonians

Commanders and leaders
Volquin	Unknown

Strength
Unknown	Unknown

Casualties and losses
Unknown	Unknown

The Battle of Riga was an attempt by native Estonian forces to repel the Crusader knights (known as the Livonian Brothers of the Sword) and their allies during the Livonian Crusade.

== History ==
In 1215, after the raid of Ridala and the loss of the Leole stronghold, Estonian forces agreed to co-operate for a large-scale counter-offensive. A strategic plan was formed, with the hoped-for result of "the complete destruction of the nearby German colonies". According to the plan, the Oeselians were to close the Daugava River estuary and besiege the city of Riga, the Rotalians were to attack the Livonians in Turaida, and the Sackalians and Ungannians were to harass the Latgalians, preventing them from coming to the assistance of Riga.

At the end of April or beginning of May 1215, the Oeselians closed the estuary of the Daugava River. Old ships and wooden obstacles built on the spot were filled with rocks and sunk to prevent German cogs from escaping to sea, and Oeselian troops took up positions in a field just outside Riga. When a strong enemy force charged out of the city, they pulled back to the estuary to await reinforcements. Unexpectedly for the besiegers, two German cogs arrived from the sea. Threatened with being caught between two armies, the Oeselian fleet decided to break out to the sea.

In the meantime, malevs from other counties were engaging in the areas of Livonia and Tālava, where the elder Tālivaldis was burnt alive. They did not achieve much success because the villagers had been able to take shelter in the strongholds. The hoped-for cooperative attack did not bring any results due to the insufficient number of troops.
