= Battle of Viljandi (1223) =

1223 military conflict in Estonia during Livonian Crusade

Livonian Crusade
Date	29 January 1223
Location	Viljandi, Estonia 58°21′35″N 25°35′36″E
Result	Estonian victory

Belligerents
Estonians	Sword-Brothers

Strength
Unknown	Unknown

Casualties and losses
Unknown	Unknown

On 29 January 1223, during a church service, the Sackalians attacked the Germans inside the stronghold of Viljandi. They killed Sword-Brothers, vartels, merchants, and even Mauritius, the vogt of Viljandi. The rest of the Germans were put in stocks and shackles. Some men advanced on to the stronghold of Leole, where they told others to do the same. Subsequently, the same Sackalians took Hebbe, the vogt of Järvamaa, and brought him to Viljandi. The heart of a still-alive Hebbe was torn out of his chest, baked on fire and eaten ritually, in order to "become strong in the fight against the Christians".

Elders of Viljandi sent a victory notice to Otepää and Tartu, calling for Estonians to act the same way. Swords covered in German soldiers' blood, captured horses, and clothes were sent to the people of Tartu. Soon after, Otepää and Tartu were liberated and Johannes, the vogt of Tartu, killed. Like in Sakala, the bodies of the killed enemy were left on the fields "for dogs and birds".

A year later after this battle, construction of a new stone fortifications - Viljandi Castle - has started.
