= Livonian Chronicle =

Livonian Chronicle may refer to one of the following chronicles:

- Livonian Rhymed Chronicle in poetic Middle High German
  - By anonymous (1180–1290)
  - By Bartholomäus Hoeneke (1340s)
- Livonian Chronicle of Henry (Heinrici Cronicon Lyvoniae 1220s) in prose Latin
- Chronicon Livoniale by Hermann von Wartberge (up to 1378) in prose Latin
- By Hermann Helewegh (15th century)
- By Balthasar Russow (1578)
- By Johann Renner (1582)
- By Franz Nyenstede (1609)
