= Caupo of Turaida =

Livonian noble (died 1217)

- Leader of Livonia
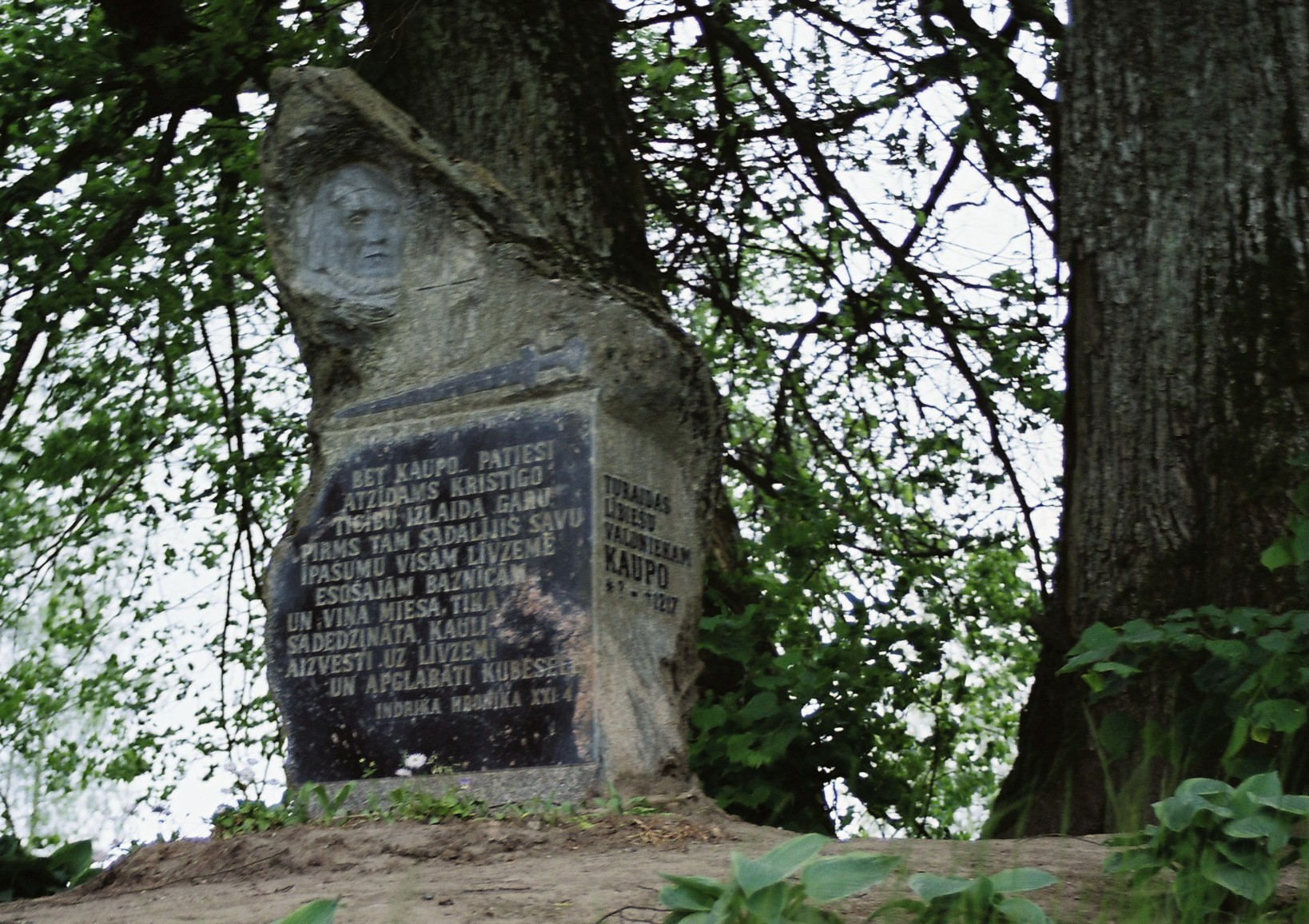
- Monument to Caupo at Krimulda Castle
- Reign: Until 21 September 1217
- Born: 12th century, presumably Kaup, Mokhovoye, modern-day Kaliningrad Oblast
- Died: 21 September 1217; Near Viljandi
- House: Lieven

Caupo of Turaida, Kaupo or Kaupo Lieven, sometimes Kubbe (died 21 September 1217) was a leader of the Finnic-speaking Livonian people in the beginning of the 13th century, in what are now parts of Latvia and Estonia by the Gulf of Riga. He is sometimes called a 'King of Livonia'; the Chronicle of Henry of Livonia refers to him as quasi rex, 'like a king'.

He is considered to be the progenitor of the Lieven family.

== Biography ==
He was most likely born in the Swedish settlement of Kaup in modern-day Kaliningrad, presumably a descendant of Varangians who participated in the founding of Kievan Rus’.

Caupo was the first prominent Livonian to be christened. He was probably baptized around 1191 by Theoderic of Turaida, a preacher who would later become the abbot of Daugavgrīva Abbey. He became an ardent Christian and a friend of Albert of Buxhoeveden, Bishop of Riga, who, in 1203–1204, took him on a journey to Rome and introduced him to Pope Innocent III. The Pope was impressed by the converted pagan chief and presented him a Bible, hundred gold pieces, ennobled him and gave him the name “Lieven.” When he returned from the journey, his tribe rebelled against him and Caupo took part in a siege of his former fortress in Turaida in 1212. The wooden fort was rebuilt two years later out of brick and stone, closer to its present surviving form.

Caupo participated in a crusader raid against the still pagan Estonians and was killed in the Battle of St. Matthew's Day in 1217, fighting against the troops of the Estonian leader Lembitu of Lehola. Caupo had male successors, his son Bertold had been killed 1210 in the Battle of Ümera. His grandson, Nicholas, was the first descendant who started using the name Lieven more frequently.

Modern Estonians, Latvians, and remaining Livonians do not have a singular view about the historical role of Caupo. Baltic nationalists generally consider him a negative figure and a traitor to his people, however, such claims are sometimes dismissed by scholars as applying a modern viewpoint to a medieval chieftain. Some Latvian folk tales name him "Kaupo the accursed, the scourge of the Livs,... Kaupo who has sold his soul to the foreign bishops."

== See also ==
- Livonian Crusade
