= Albert of Riga =

German bishop in medieval Livonia

- Bishop of Riga
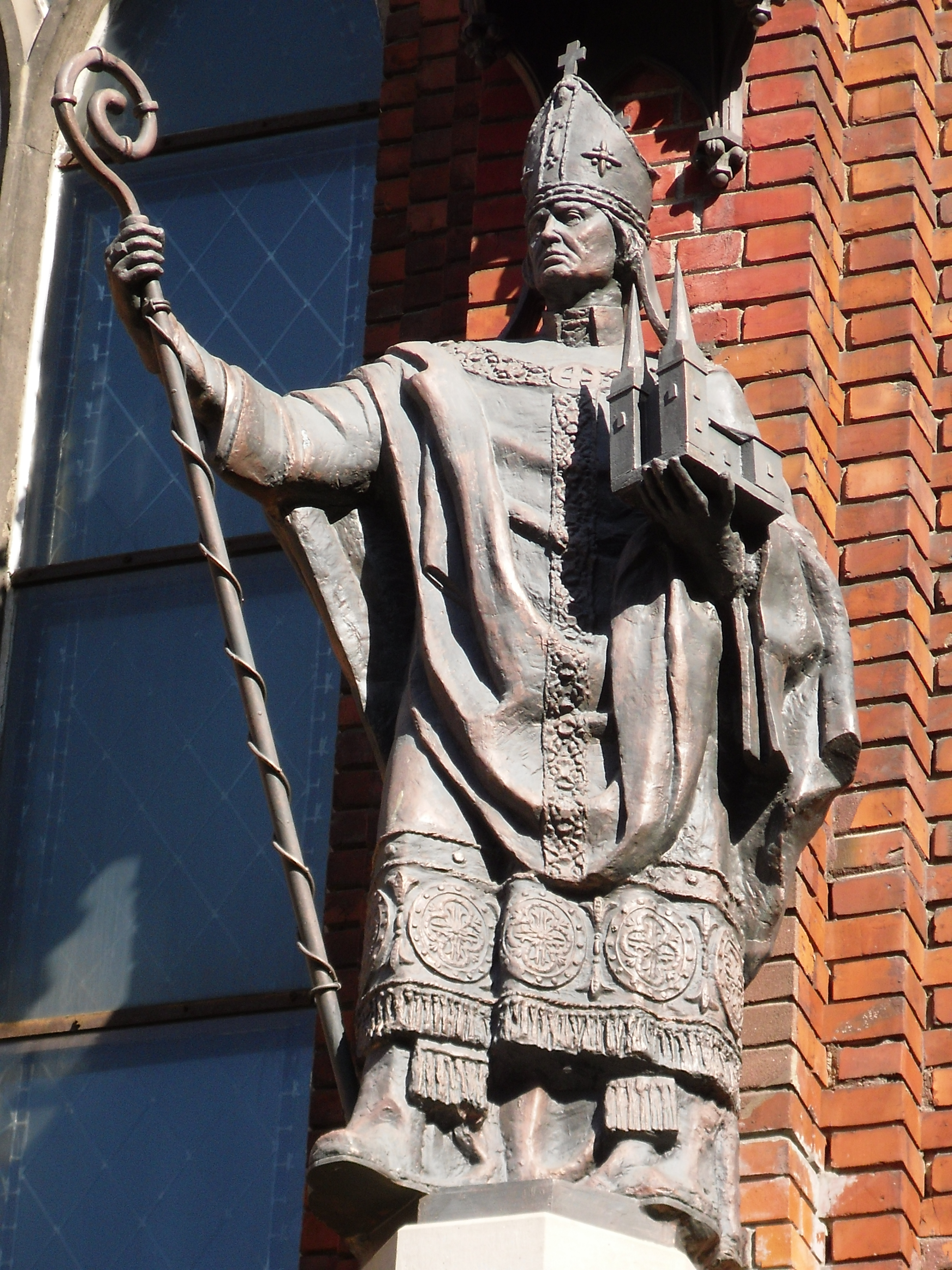
- Albert of Riga, copy of a sculpture by Karl Hans Bernewitz on the cloister wall of Riga Cathedral
- Native name: Albert von Buxthoeven
- Predecessor: Berthold of Hanover
- Successor: Nikolaus von Nauen

Personal details
- Born: c. 1165 Bexhövede, Lower Saxony, Germany
- Died: 17 January 1229

Albert of Riga or Albert of Livonia (Note: German: Albert von Buxthoeven, Latvian: Alberts fon Buksthēvdens) (c. 1165 – 17 January 1229) was the third Catholic Bishop of Riga in Livonia. As the Bishop of Livonia, in 1201, he founded Riga, the modern capital city of Latvia, and the city was later made a bishopric. The building of the Riga Cathedral started during his tenure there in 1221.

Albert headed the armed forces that forcibly converted the pagan indigenous population of the eastern Baltic region to Christianity as a result of the Northern Crusades.

== Early life ==
Albert was born in Bexhövede, a part of Loxstedt, Lower Saxony, Germany. He and his brother Hermann were members of the powerful Buxhoeveden family from Bexhövede. Because of this he has also been known as Albert of Buxhoeveden (or Bexhövede, Buxhövden, Buxhöwde, Buxthoeven, Appeldern).

Albert was a canon in Bremen when his uncle Hartwig, Archbishop of Bremen and Hamburg, named him Bishop of Livonia, provided that he could conquer and hold it, and convince the pagan inhabitants to become Christians. The patent was granted on 28 March 1199, and in the beginning of spring 1200 he embarked for Livonia with a fleet of 23 vessels and more than 1,500 armed crusaders. He had the support of the Hohenstaufen German king, Philip of Swabia, as well as an implicit blessing of Pope Innocent III.

In 1200, Bishop Albert led a crusade in Livonia, providing the starting point to create an ecclesiastical State. Albert arrived in his diocese in Ikšķile (Üxküll) with a sizeable army. He was able to send reinforcements without asking permission from the Pope. These rights led him to create an annual summer expedition from Lübeck to Livonia called the "perpetual crusade".

== Career ==
=== Founding of Riga ===
When Albert realized that the diocese of Uexküll was located far away from the Daugava river to be effective, he founded a castle nearer the sea, where a small stream joined the Daugava creating a natural harbor. This castle would be the start of the foundation of Riga.

Together with merchants from the Baltic Sea island of Gotland, Albert founded Riga in 1201, where a small community of Hanseatic traders from Lübeck held a tentative trading encampment. In 1204, he received a papal bull to sign up crusaders.

He successfully converted many Livs under their leader Caupo, offering them protection against neighboring Lithuanian and Estonian tribes; Albert also subjugated Latvian principalities of Koknese, Jersika and Tālava later on. The conquest of Livonia in full occupied almost three decades of his life.

=== Later life ===
In the 1217 Battle of Otepää, the Russians of Pskov, along with an Estonian force, laid siege to the fortress of Otepää. The Russians were outraged that some of the Estonians accepted Latin Christianity instead of Orthodoxy. Albert's brother Theodoricus was taken to Novgorod, according to the Livonian Chronicle of Henry, and Albert's emissaries went there to confirm the peace treaty, leading to a German withdrawal from the fortress.

Albert created a military order, the Livonian Brothers of the Sword, and began to build his cathedral in 1215. King Philip made him a Prince of the Holy Roman Empire, with Livonia for a fief, and thus Albert became a "Prince-Bishop". In 1225, King Henry (VII) of Germany confirmed the title of Prince for Albert and his brother, Hermann. Albert declared his diocese independent of Bremen, and later Riga was raised to an archbishopric.

A first-hand account of Albert is in the contemporary Livonian Chronicle of Henry by Henry of Latvia.

Albert died in Riga in 1229. As a Catholic bishop, he left no descendants. He was venerated as a Catholic saint until the Protestant Reformation. The present-day von Buxhoeveden are descendants of his cousin Johannes von Buxhoeveden. Albert's brother Theodoricus married a niece of the prince of Novgorod, Mstislav Mstislavich, and is the progenitor of the family de Raupena (de Ropa, known today as "von der Ropp") that founded manors in Livonia and Courland.

== Legacy ==
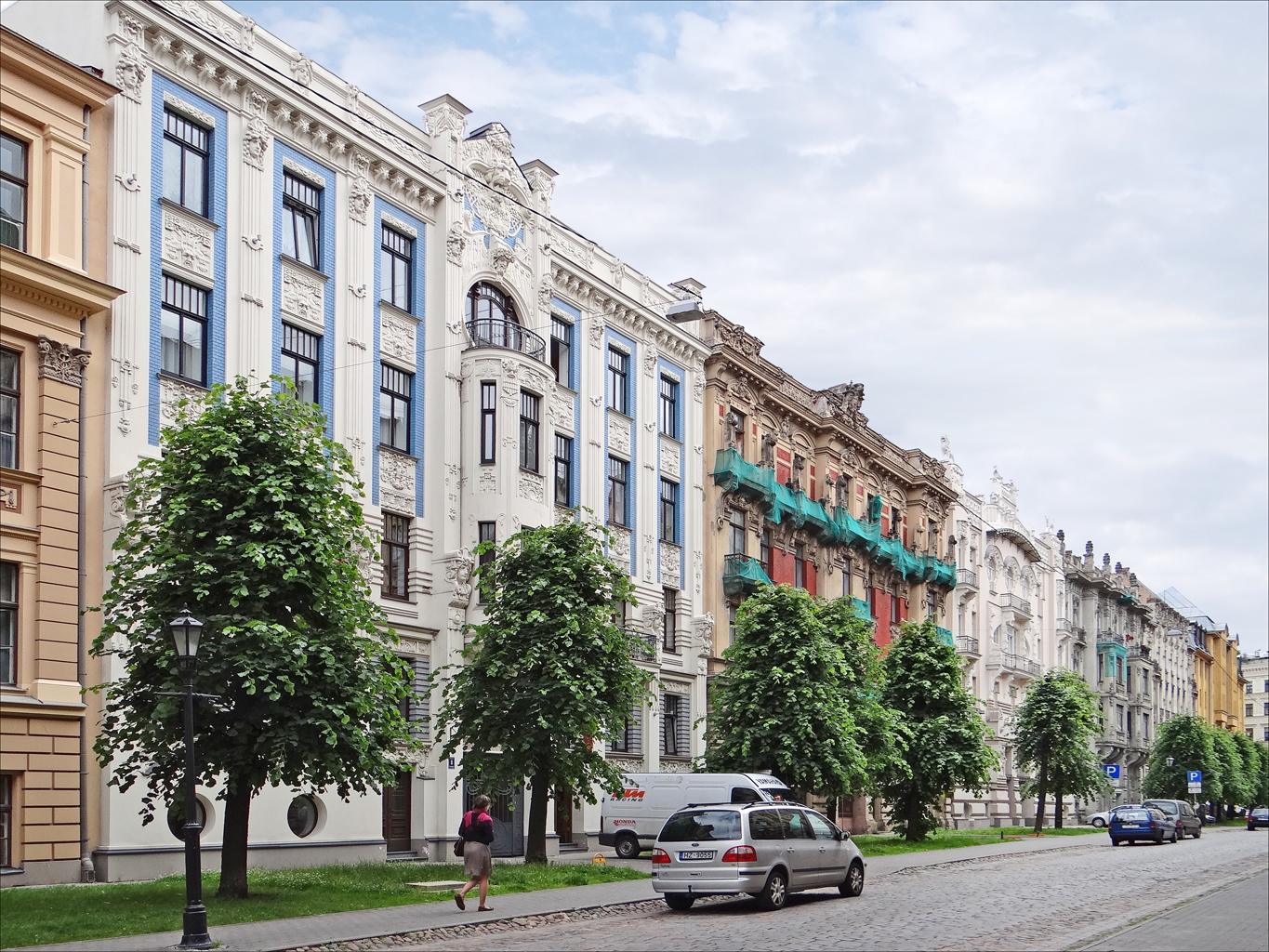
Albert Street

Albert Street in Riga is named after Bishop Albert.

== Sources ==
- "Альберт I фон Аппельдерн" . Brockhaus and Efron Encyclopedic Dictionary (in Russian). 1906.
- Murray, Alan V. (5 December 2016). The Clash of Cultures on the Medieval Baltic Frontier. Routledge. ISBN 978-1-351-89260-5.

Catholic Church titles
Preceded by Berthold	Bishop of Livonia; 1199–1229	Succeeded by Nicolaus
