= Henry of Latvia =

Priest, missionary and historian (1187 – c. 1259)

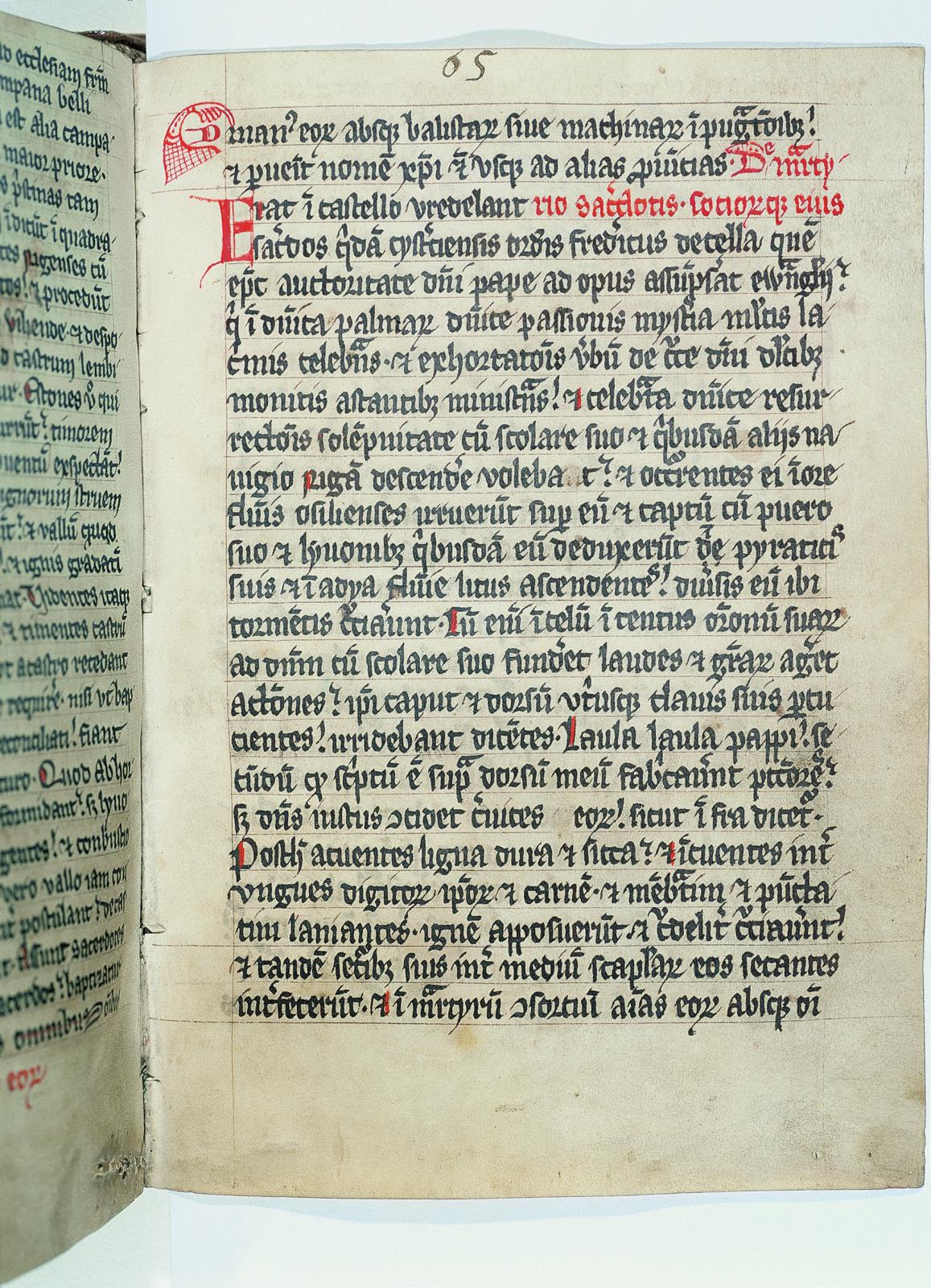
- A page from a copy of the Livonian Chronicle of Henry, the original of which was compiled ca. 1229
- Born: 1187; Magdeburg, Landgraviate of Thuringia
- Died: c. 1259; Papendorf, Livonia, (currently Rubene, Kocēni parish, Kocēni Municipality, Latvia)
- Occupations: priest, missionary, historian
- Years active: 1208-after 1259
- Notable work: Livonian Chronicle of Henry

Henry of Latvia (Latin: Henricus de Lettis; German: Heinrich von Lettland; Latvian: Latviešu Indriķis; Estonian: Läti Henrik; 1187 – c. 1259), also known as Henry of Livonia, was a priest, missionary and historian. He wrote the Livonian Chronicle of Henry which describes the evangelization of the regions which are now part of Estonia and Latvia during the Northern Crusades.

== Biography ==
The chronicles say that Henry was a Roman Catholic priest who witnessed most of events described. Henry is thought to have been born in 1187 in Magdeburg. Henry was probably German, but many historians consider him a Latvian, brought up in a German family and consistently referring to Germans as "we", although it is also possible that he came from Livonia. He had a thoroughly German and Catholic education and as a youth was attached to the household of the Prince-Bishop Albert of Buxhoeveden (c.1165 – 17 January 1229), was ordained a priest in 1208, founded a parish and lived out his life in peace.

Henry's Chronicles, compiled around 1229, are written from a clerical point of view, that the history of the Church was the essential history of Livonia. The Chronicles may have originated as a report to the papal legate, William of Modena, to whom he was assigned as interpreter 1225 through 1227. The legate, one of the papacy's most able diplomats, was in Livonia to mediate an internal church dispute between the Livonian Brothers of the Sword, and the territorial claims of the Catholic bishops of Livonia.

He was mentioned in documents published in 1231 and 1259 as being a priest. Henry died after 1259 in Rubene, aged at least 72. He lived in Rubene until at least 1259, when he was questioned as a witness in a dispute over the boundaries of the archdiocese and the order at Lake Burtnieks and Salaca. During this time he was called Lord Indrica of the parish of Papendorf (dominus Hinricus plebanus de Papendorpe).
