= Livonian Chronicle of Henry =

13th-century manuscript about the Livonian Crusade

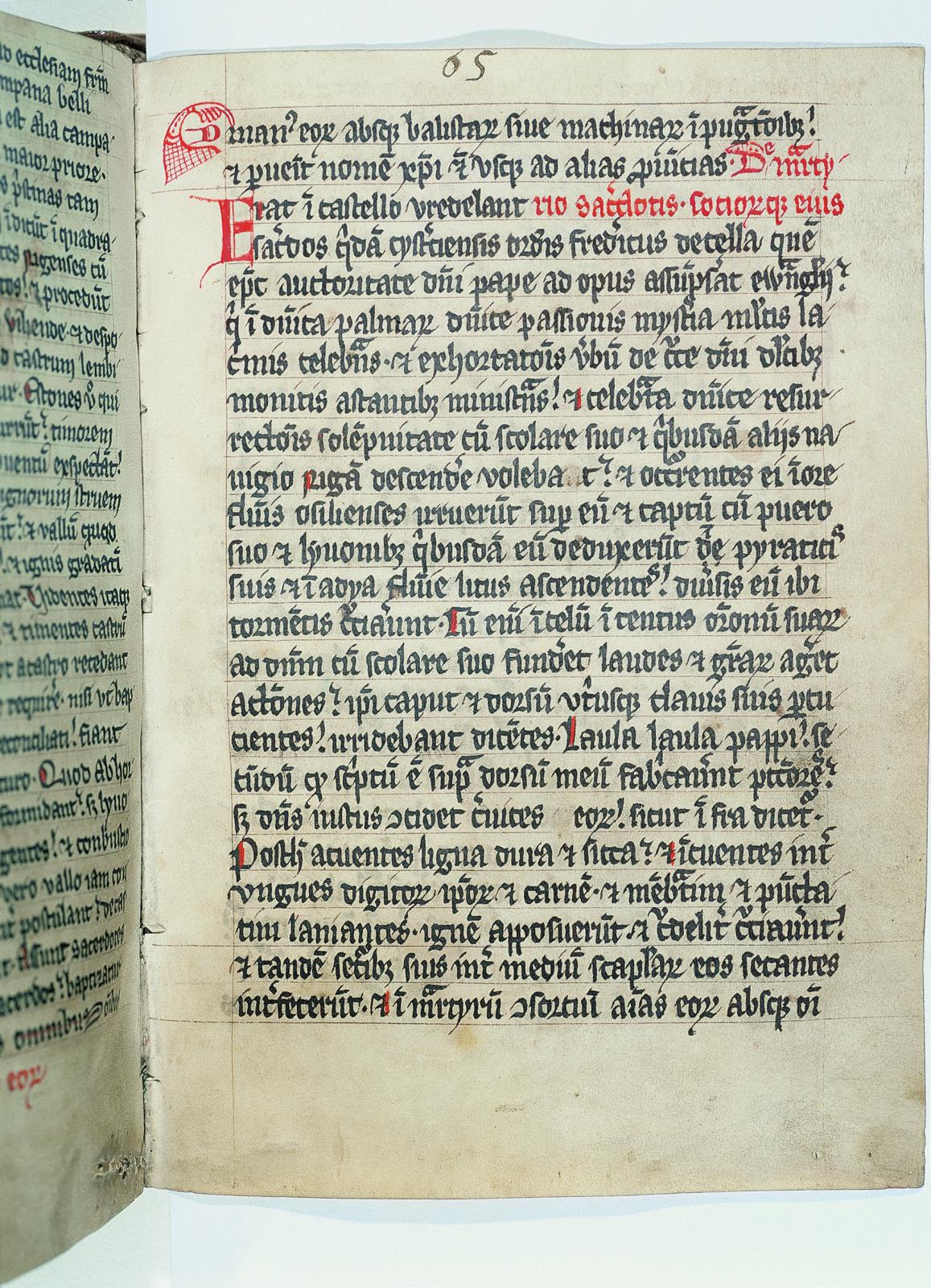
A page from a copy of the Henry of Latvia manuscript

The Livonian Chronicle of Henry (Latin: Heinrici Cronicon Lyvoniae) is a Latin narrative of events in Livonia (roughly corresponding to today's Estonia and Latvia) and surrounding areas from 1180 to 1227. It was written c. 1229 by a priest named Henry. Apart from some references in Gesta Danorum – a patriotic work by the 12th-century Danish historian Saxo Grammaticus – and few mentions in the Primary Chronicle compiled in Kievan Rus', the Chronicle of Henry is the oldest known written document about the history of Estonia and Latvia.

== Background ==
Papal calls for renewed holy war at the end of the twelfth century inspired the disastrous Fourth Crusade that sacked Constantinople in 1204, as well as a series of simultaneous "Northern Crusades" (that have been less covered in English-language popular history) which were more successful in the long run. Before the crusades, the region of medieval Livonia was a mixed outpost, a mostly "pagan" society where merchants from the Hanseatic League encountered merchants of Novgorod, and where the Christian Teutonic, Scandinavian, and Slavic trade, culture, and religions all mingled within the local "pagan" Baltic and Finnic societies. The specific indigenous ethnic groups that intermingled and traded with the Saxons, Danes, Swedes, Wends, merchants from Lübeck, Novgorod and Pskov there were the Estonians, Livonians, Curonians, Semigallians, Selonians, Latgalians (also known as Letts), and Lithuanians. The Western merchants would trade silver, textiles, and other luxury goods for furs, beeswax, honey, leather, dried fish, and amber. Livonia had been an especially promising location in terms of resources, and Arnold of Lübeck, in his Chronica Slavorum wrote that the land was "abundant in many riches" and was "fertile in fields, plentiful in pastures, irrigated by rivers", and "also sufficiently rich in fish and forested with trees".

Eventually, the Scandinavian rulers and German military knightly orders led by German prince-bishops conquered and resettled the Baltic region, drawing it into Western orbit. The Livonian Chronicle of Henry was written during the first generation of conversion in Livonia when Albert of Buxhoeveden (later, Bishop of Riga) had authority over the land. The Teutonic Order continued to implement Christianity across Livonia after the Livonian Brothers of the Sword, the crusading army established by Albert of Riga, was absorbed by them in 1237.

== Content ==
The Livonian Chronicle of Henry provides eyewitness accounts of the events, with an invaluable and deeply human history. It provides insight, not only into military operations in the East during this tumultuous period but also into the conflicted attitudes of an eyewitness; it reveals the complexities of religious motives enmeshed with political aims.

The Livonian Chronicle of Henry utilizes two major points of justification for the conquest of Livonia: that it was the Land of the Virgin Mary, which began after Bishop Meinhard, the first Bishop who attempted to spread Christianity to Livonia, established a Cult of Mary convent in Livonia. Following this, Albert of Riga also helped perpetuate this association by naming the Episcopal Cathedral in Livonia as the church of the Virgin Mary in the early 1200s.

The second main justification was that Livonia was comparable to Jerusalem. Pope Innocent III granted the absolution of sins for those making a pilgrimage to Livonia after tensions arose between the German Christians and the pagans. Bishop Meinhard had attempted to convert the pagans without success and also appointed Theoderich von Treyden to help with the Christianization of Livonia. This concerned the people of Livonia, who then plotted to kill Theoderich, which proved unsuccessful but increased German mistrust after the plot's discovery. When Pope Innocent III gave absolution of sin to those who went to aid in the Christianization of Livonia, Henry makes the association between the lands of Livonia and Jerusalem by stating, "In enjoining the Livonian pilgrimage for the plenary remission of sins, made it equal with that to Jerusalem" (Brundage, CHL, 36). Honorius III and Gregory IX continued to promote Livonia as comparable to Jerusalem by enforcing privileges (including the protection of property) to Livonian crusaders.

Other reasons include justification on the basis of the defense of Christianity, the conversion of pagans, and the return of apostates to Christianity. Many have questioned to what extent the Christianization of Livonia was in fact about commercial and political gains. Henry mentions in his chronicle that there was a notable number of German merchants in the crusading army, but does not describe their stake in the crusade. Conversely, in the Livonian Rhymed Chronicle, the writer states that these merchants would, "Sell [their wares] to greater advantage there than elsewhere". Politically, because Livonia was so rich in natural resources and was such an important trading hub for so many nations and people, gaining political control over this land would bring political advancement to Germany over the other nations that were vying for the resources that existed in Livonia during this time. The modern English translator of the Livonian Chronicle of Henry, James A. Brundage, also argues that the German popes, kings, bishops, and dukes would have been aware of the existing positive economic and political potential in Livonia.

The chronicles consist of four books.

- The first book, "On Livonia" describes events between 1186 and 1196: the arrival of the first bishop of Ikšķile, Meinhard, and the baptizing of Livonians.
- The second book, "On bishop Berthold" describes events between 1196 and 1198: the arrival of the second bishop of Ikšķile Berthold of Hanover and his death in the battle with Livonians near what later became the town of Riga.
- The third book, "On bishop Albert" describes events between 1198 and 1208: the arrival of third bishop of Ikšķile, Albert of Buxhoeveden, the foundation of the Christian knightly order of the Livonian Brothers of the Sword, the conquest and dividing of Livonian territories between the Bishopric of Livonia and the Order, the wars with the Princes of Polotsk and Lithuanians, conquest of the Principality of Koknese and the country of Selonians.
- The fourth book, "On Estonia" describes events between 1208 and 1226: the campaigns against Estonian counties, the conquest of the Principality of Jersika, the wars with Curonians, Semigallians, Lithuanians and the princes of Pskov and Novgorod.

The original manuscript of the chronicle has not been preserved. There are sixteen different copies, dating from 14th to 19th century, the oldest of which is the Codex Zamoscianus, written on parchment and dating from the end of the 13th century. The Codex Zamoscianus is incomplete, as the text of the Chronicle ends in the 23rd chapter. The Codex Zamoscianus is presently kept in the Polish National Library in Warsaw.

English online material on the chronicle is rather scarce, though there are some excerpts . The Latin copy in the Polish National Library is available online.

A modern translation of the chronicle was published in 1961 (2nd ed. 2004) by James A Brundage and is available through Columbia University Press.

== Author ==
The author of the chronicle is Henry of Latvia (Henricus de Lettis). Henry was a Catholic priest who witnessed most of the events described in the chronicle. He was born between 1180 and 1188, most likely in Germany. He bears a German forename and consistently refers to Germans in the first person plural although it is also possible that he came from Livonia. Henry also had a thoroughly German and Catholic education and as a youth was attached to the household of the Prince-Bishop Albert of Buxhoeveden, later known as Albert of Riga, who was ordained a priest in 1208 and who founded a parish and lived out his life in peace. Henry most likely wrote the Chronicle of Livonia in dedication to Albert of Buxhoeveden, who died in 1229, likely around the same time that this chronicle was written. It is unknown whether or not the author contributed any additional written work before or after writing this chronicle.

Henry's Chronicle is written from the clerical point of view, that the history of the Church was the essential history of Livonia. The Chronicle may have originated as a report to the papal legate William of Modena, to whom he was assigned as an interpreter in 1225 through 1227. The legate, one of the papacy's most able diplomats, was in Livonia to mediate an internal church dispute between the Livonian Brothers of the Sword, and the territorial claims of the Catholic bishops of Livonia.

== Assessment ==
For many episodes in the early stages of the Christianization of the peoples of the eastern Baltic, the Chronicle of Henry is the major surviving evidence aside from the Livonian Rhymed Chronicle and the Novgorod First Chronicle.

The Livonian Chronicle of Henry has been highlighted for the purpose of understanding the complexities of crusading ideology because it describes the religious motives used to justify the crusade as well as alluding to the potential economic and political benefits that were existent in the Christianization of Livonia by mentioning the fact that there were merchants who were present in the crusading army. This chronicle is also an example of a crusader document that implements opinionated and demeaning rhetoric towards the people they were conquering, especially when describing the nature of the pagans when Bishop Meinhard initially fails to convert them without the use of force by promising to build them forts if they would accept baptism. Many of the pagans accepted this offer but didn't have intentions to change their faith to Christianity. When it was discovered that these people were still practicing their pagan beliefs and rituals, many of those involved in implementing the crusade, including Henry himself, expressed their disapproval and judgments of these individuals.

== Sources ==
- Ruth Williamson, "Primary Source Analysis of the Chronicle of Henry of Livonia"
- Indriķa hronika - Full translation into Latvian with comments.
- Bibliography of Henry of Livonia
- Crusading and Chronicle Writing on the Medieval Baltic Frontier: A Companion to the Chronicle of Henry of Livonia
- de Lettis, Henricus (2005). Bugiani, Piero (ed.). Chronicon Livoniae. Books. ISBN 978-88-7997-078-5.
- Text of the chronicle in Latin with Russian translation (published in 1938)
