= Battle of Skuodas (1259) =

1259 battle fought in present-day Lithuania

- Part of the Lithuanian Crusade
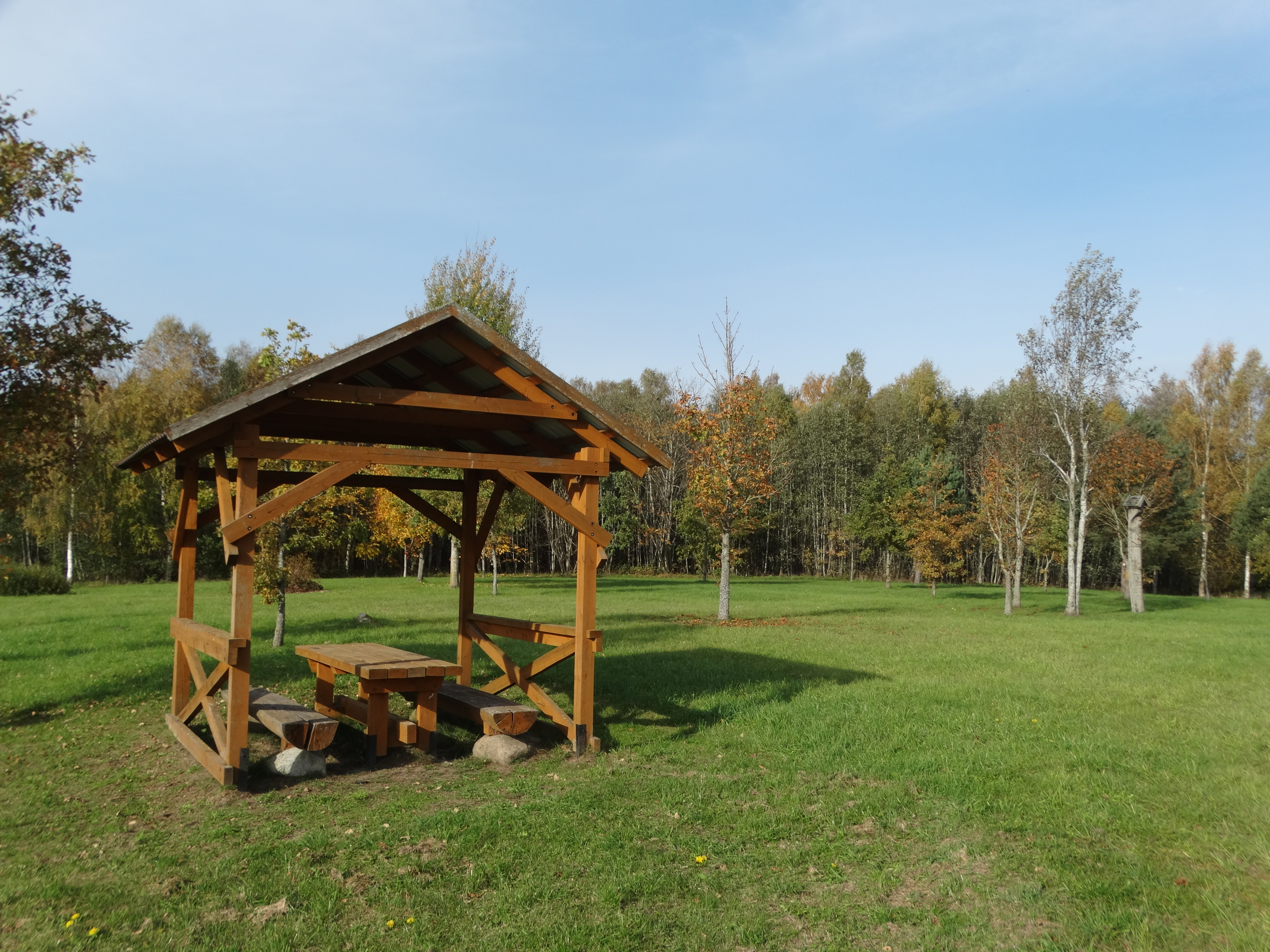
- Place of the battle of Skuodas, Luknės, Lithuania
| Date | 1258 or 1259 |
| Location | Luknė village, 6 km (3.7 mi) southwest of Skuodas 56°14′11″N 21°26′26″E |
| Result | Samogitian victory |

Belligerents
| Samogitians | Livonian Order, Curonians |

Commanders and leaders
| Alminas | Bernard von Haren |

Strength
| 3,000 | Unknown |

Casualties and losses
| Unknown | 33 knights killed |

The Battle of Skuodas or Schoden was fought in ca. 1259 near Skuodas in present-day Lithuania during the Lithuanian Crusade. The Samogitian army of 3,000 invaded Courland and on their way back defeated the Livonian Order, killing 33 knights and many more low-rank soldiers. In terms of knights killed, it was the eighth largest defeat of the Livonian Order in the 13th century. This victory led to a Semigallian insurrection against the Livonian crusaders, which lasted from 1259 to 1272.

== Background ==
In 1251, Mindaugas, pagan Grand Duke of Lithuania, concluded a peace treaty with the Livonian Order: he was to be baptized and crowned as King of Lithuania in return for portions of Samogitia, Nadruva, and Dainava. Mindaugas was crowned on 6 July 1253 and the promised lands were transferred to the Order. The Order built the Memel Castle (Klaipėda) on the border with Samogitia to serve as the basis for further expansion. After Samogitians unsuccessfully attacked the new castle, their nobles formed a military coalition, elected Algminas (or Almenas) as their leader, and organized offensive raids to Courland. After the Samogitians defeated the knights near Klaipėda and killed 12 knights in 1257, a Samogitian envoy in Riga requested a two-year truce. The truce was supported by Riga merchants, who sought to increase wax and fur trade with the Samogitians.

== Battle ==
When the truce expired, Samogitians did not seek an extension, but once again organized a raid to Courland. This raid might have been prompted by Mindaugas, who granted Samogitia in its entirety to the Order on 7 August 1259 while seeking allies against the Golden Horde that plundered Lithuanian lands in the winter of 1259. However, the exact date or year of the battle is unknown. Historian Edvardas Gudavičius dated the battle late summer or early autumn 1258.

While the Samogitians were plundering Courland, the knights from Kuldīga requested reinforcements from Klaipėda. The Knights pursued retreating Samogitians, who carried their loot back home and the decisive battle took place near Skuodas. The Livonian Rhymed Chronicle blamed the defeat on the cowardly Curonians, who did not withstand the Samogitian pressure and retreated from the battlefield leaving the knights exposed. Inspired by the success, the Samogitians almost immediately organized another raid into Courland. This time Livonian Grand Master Burchard von Hornhausen commanded the Knights. However, the Knights were careful to avoid an ambush while the Samogitians decided not to engage in a pitched battle.

== Aftermath ==
The battle inspired the Semigallians to rebel against the Order. The Knights, finding little success in an open battlefield turned to strategic warfare. They attacked Tērvete (Terwerten) hoping to turn the Semigallian outpost into a Teutonic castle. When the attack failed, they built a fortress in nearby Dobele (Doblen) and Goergenburg (possibly present-day Jurbarkas) in Samogitia. Both castles were soon attacked by the Semigallians and Samogitians. The following year, the Samogitians raided Courland again and provoked the Knights into the Battle of Durbe, where the Order suffered even greater defeat. After these disasters, it took some thirty years for the Livonian Order to restore its status and territory.
