= Werner von Breithausen =

Master of the Livonian Order (1261–1263)

Landmeister Werner von Breithausen
- Master of the Livonian Order
- Elected: 1261
- In office: 1261–1263
- Predecessor: Burkhard von Hornhausen
- Successor: Konrad von Mandern

Personal details
- Denomination: Roman Catholic

Werner von Breithausen (fl. 13th century) was the ninth Master of the Livonian Order.

== Biography ==
Little is known about Werner von Briethausen. He succeeded Burkhard von Hornhausen, who was killed at the Battle of Durbe in 1260, whilst on campaign against the Curonians and Samogitians. Elected in 1261, he served until 1263. He may be the same Werner mentioned as the Landmarshall of the Livonian Order in 1241 and the Vogt of Karkuse Castle

Much of Werner's tenure as leader of the Livonian Order was spent campaigning against the Balts who were capitalizing on the Order's disastrous defeat at the Battle of Durbe. Specifically, the King of Lithuania, Mindaugas, as well as the Curonians and Samogitians all launched raids and attacks. In 1263, the Livonian Knights engaged the Curonians at Memel, where the local commander of the Order was killed via burning; in response, soldiers of the Order went to Kretinga, which said commander had been attempting to seize, and slaughtered the local population. Forces of the Order went south to subdue the Curonians, burning two castles and capturing another. Raids by the Samogitians resulted in the destruction of Pärnu, which prompted a follow up battle at Daugavgrīva Abbey.

After his term was finished, he was succeeded by Konrad von Mandern.
