= Battle of Memel (1257) =

1257 battle of the Livonian Crusade

Coordinates: 55°42′N 21°8′E

- Part of the Livonian Crusade
| Date | 1257 |
| Location | Near Memel (Klaipėda) |
| Result | The result of the battle is not stated in historical sources. Samogitians didn't seize Memel/ Klaipėda. But the city wasnt taken after the battle. |

Belligerents
| Livonian Order | Samogitians |

Commanders and leaders
| Burchard Hornhauzen, Bernard Haren | Alminas |

Strength
| 40 knights, 500 Curonians | 1000-2000 |

Casualties and losses
| 12 knights | Unknown |

The Battle of Memel was fought between the Samogitians and the Livonian Order in 1257 near Memel (now Klaipėda in Lithuania).

When Mindaugas, King of Lithuania, transferred most of Samogitia to the Livonian Order in 1257, Duke Alminas was elected as the Samogitian leader and organized resistance. In 1253, the Germans built the Memel Castle on the Curonian land in the strategically important spot where Dangė River meets the Curonian Lagoon. The new castle threatened Curonians and Samogitians.

In 1256, Master of the Livonian land, Anno von Sangershausen, was elected as the Grand Master of the Teutonic Order. In his previous position he was replaced by the former komtur of the Königsberg Castle, Burchard Hornhauzen, who was almost immediately faced with a serious challenge – a Samogitian army which invaded the Memel area. Hornhauzen hurriedly gathered about a thousand soldiers (over 40 knights and about 500 Curonians and an unknown number of ordinary order's warriors and marched to meet the invaders, but he clearly underestimated the enemy's strength. There is no data that the battle ended in the Order's defeat, but 12 knights were killed according to Livonian Rhymed chronicle. After this battle Order and Samogitians agreed to a truce for 2 years. Hornhauzen and komtur of Courland were injured and barely managed to escape the battlefield.

The Samogitians further defeated the Livonian Order in the Battle of Skuodas (1259) and Battle of Durbe (1260) forcing the order to become a branch of the Teutonic Knights.
