= Almenas =

- Lithuanian surname
- m.: Almenas
- f.: (unmarried): Almenaitė
- f.: (married): Almenienė

Almenas is a surname of two possible origins: a Lithuanian surname and the spelling of the Swedish surname Almenäs without diacritics.

Kazys Almenas wrote in his memoir Anuomet that his birth name was Alminas and he changed the letter 'i' to 'e' when accepting the American citizenship in order to restore the old Samogitian spelling of the name.

Almenäs is a Swedish topographic surname: alm='elm' + -näs = 'headland', 'nose', 'spit'.

Notable people with the surnames include:

- Jessica Almenäs (born 1975), Swedish television presenter and reporter
- Kazys Almenas (1935–2017), Lithuanian physicist, writer, essayist, and publisher

== See also ==
- Almena (disambiguation)
