= Volkwin =

Master (Herrmeister) of the Livonian Brothers of the Sword from 1209 to 1236

2nd Master of the Livonian Brothers of the Sword
- In office 1209–1236
- Preceded by: Wenno von Rohrbach
- Succeeded by: Hermann Balk (as leader of Teutonic Knights)

Personal details
- Died: 22 September 1236

Military service
- Battles/wars: Northern Crusades; Livonian Crusade; Battle of Saule

Volkwin von Naumburg zu Winterstätten (also Wolquin, Folkwin, Folkvin, Wolguinus, or Wolgulin; Middle High German: Volkewîn; died 22 September 1236) was the Master (Herrenmeister) of the Livonian Brothers of the Sword from 1209 to 1236.

== Life and death ==
Originally from Naumburg, Germany, Volkwin succeeded Wenno von Rohrbach, the first master of the order. Volkwin led the Sword-Brothers in the Northern Crusades in Latvia and Estonia against the Samogitians, Curonians, Semigallians, and Selonians. He was ultimately killed by the Samogitians during the course of the Battle of Saule in 1236. The surviving Sword-Brothers were subsequently assimilated into the Teutonic Knights led by Hermann Balk, becoming its autonomous branch, the Livonian Order.

== Sources ==
- "Волькевин" . Brockhaus and Efron Encyclopedic Dictionary (in Russian). 1906.
