= Lamata (disambiguation) =

Lamata is an ancient territory of Baltic tribes within modern West Lithuania.

Lamata or LAMATA may also refer to:

- Lagos Metropolitan Area Transport Authority
- Juan Lamata (1931-1991), Venezuelan TV film director and producer
- Luis Alberto Lamata (born 1959), Venezuelan film director
