= Lamata =

Ancient Baltic tribal territory

Baltic tribes, 12th century. Lamata is in the area of the junction of the lands of Scalvians and Samogitians by the Curonian Lagoon

Lamata or Lamata Land is an ancient territory of Baltic tribes within modern West Lithuania near the Curonian Lagoon. The area is tentatively identified by the major population centers Šilutė, Priekulė and Švėkšna, although the hillforts identified with Lamata are located as far to the northwest as Mataičiai and by Versmininkai westwards of Šilutė. Some archeologists, starting with Adolfas Tautavičius, identify it as a separate ethnocultural entity and describe the area as a "microregion", while others, including Marija Gimbutas and Gintautas Zabiela disagree with the theory of Tautavičius and attribute the land to Scalvians or Western Samogitians.

== Historical references ==
Scriptores rerum Prussicarum (vol.1, 1861, p. 737) say that Lamata was first mentioned by Saxo Grammaticus in 1231. Other historical mentions include names Lammato, Lammata, Lamotin. Chronicon terrae Prussiae by Peter of Dusburg dates a reference to Lamata between 1294 and 1300. "Lammato" is listed in Liber Census Daniae.

== Territory ==
According to the archaeological research the area is tentatively identified by the major population centers Šilutė, Priekulė and Švėkšna, although the hillforts identified with Lamata are located as far to the northwest as Mataičiai and by Versmininkai westwards of Šilutė.

Vladas Žulkus delineated Lamata as follows. Its western border was the Minija river. The northern border run along the lower part of Agluona, a tributary of Minija, the upper reaches of Aisė and Veiviržas, and the upper reaches of Šalpė, a tributary of Veiviržas. From here the eastern border went south towards the upper reaches of Graumena,Ašva, and Tenenys, to the upper reaches of Šyša.

Most of the territory is within limnoglacial and moraine plains with an abundance of rivers and rivulets, with highest concentration of water routes being in the north of the area, which matched the highest concentration of hillforts.

The total area of Lamata Land is estimated 100-500 km^{2}.

Researchers identified several territorial units ("castle districts" Lithuanian: pilių apygardos) of Lamata formed during 10th-13th centuries.

== Archaeology ==
The Lamata land is characterized by distinct grouping of hillforts and cemeteries in its area, which were not considered by previous scholars. The archaeological material from these sites demonstrate a culture of Baltic tribes with the influences of alien cultures, favoring a hypothesis of the formation of a separate ethnic group at the break of 6th and 7th centuries, during the migration of Baltic tribes affected by the migration of Germanic and Hunnish tribes happened earlier, known as the Great Migration (Völkerwanderung in German sources). This conclusion is supported by some common indicators of an ethnicity, such as ornaments, the ways of their wearing, in particular, women's ornaments and amulets. Some other researchers suggest the period of 10th-13th centuries for the existence of a separate ethnicity in the area.

An open question is what had happened to this microregion in the Viking Age and early Mediaeval times, because there are clear indications that these hillforts were abandoned by 13th century, suggesting depopulation.

=== Hillforts ===
- Skomantai hillfort (Ragokalnis, Raguva); located in the Northern part of the area
- Akmeniškiai hillfort (Pilalė, Švedų Pilalė, Margpilis) with a foothill settlement, dating 1st millennium- 13th century, on a high promontory on the right bank of the Šyša river
- Akmeniškių piliakalnis II (Akmeniškiai hillfort II), Akmeniškiai, dating 1st-2nd centuries A.D., on the right bank of the Šyša river
