= Battle of Saule =

1236 battle of the Livonian Crusade

- Part of the Livonian Crusade
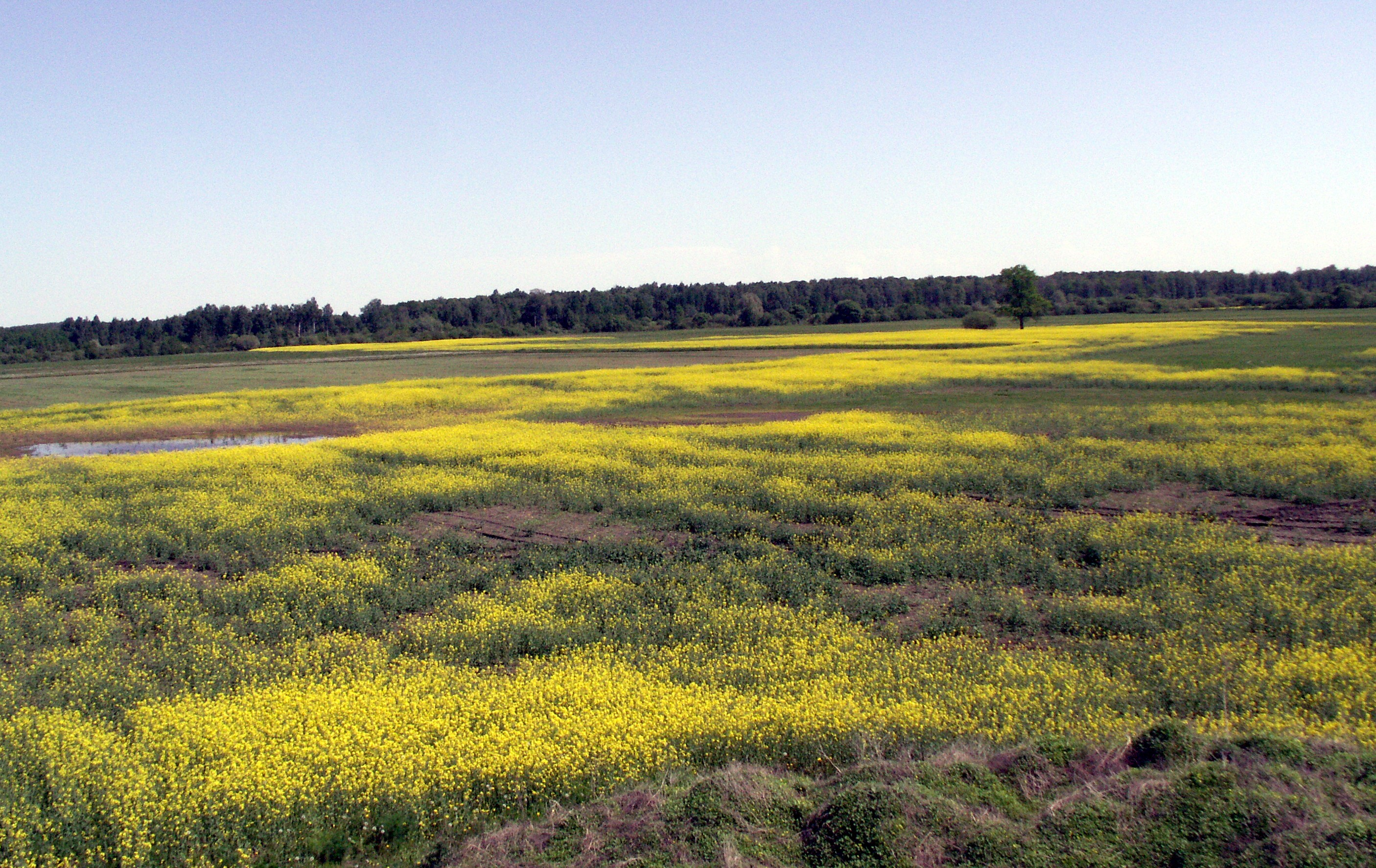
- Supposed site of the battle, near Jauniūnai
Date	22 September 1236
Location	Uncertain 56°06′52″N 23°30′52″E
Result	Samogitian and Semigalian victory
Territorial changes	Dissolution of the Livonian Brothers of the Sword and formation of the Livonian Order

Belligerents
Livonian Brothers of the Sword; Pskov Land; Livonians; Latgallians	Samogitians; Semigallians

Commanders and leaders
Volkwin †	Vykintas

Strength
3,000	4,000–5,000

Casualties and losses
48–60 knights killed; 2,700 total killed	1,200 total killed
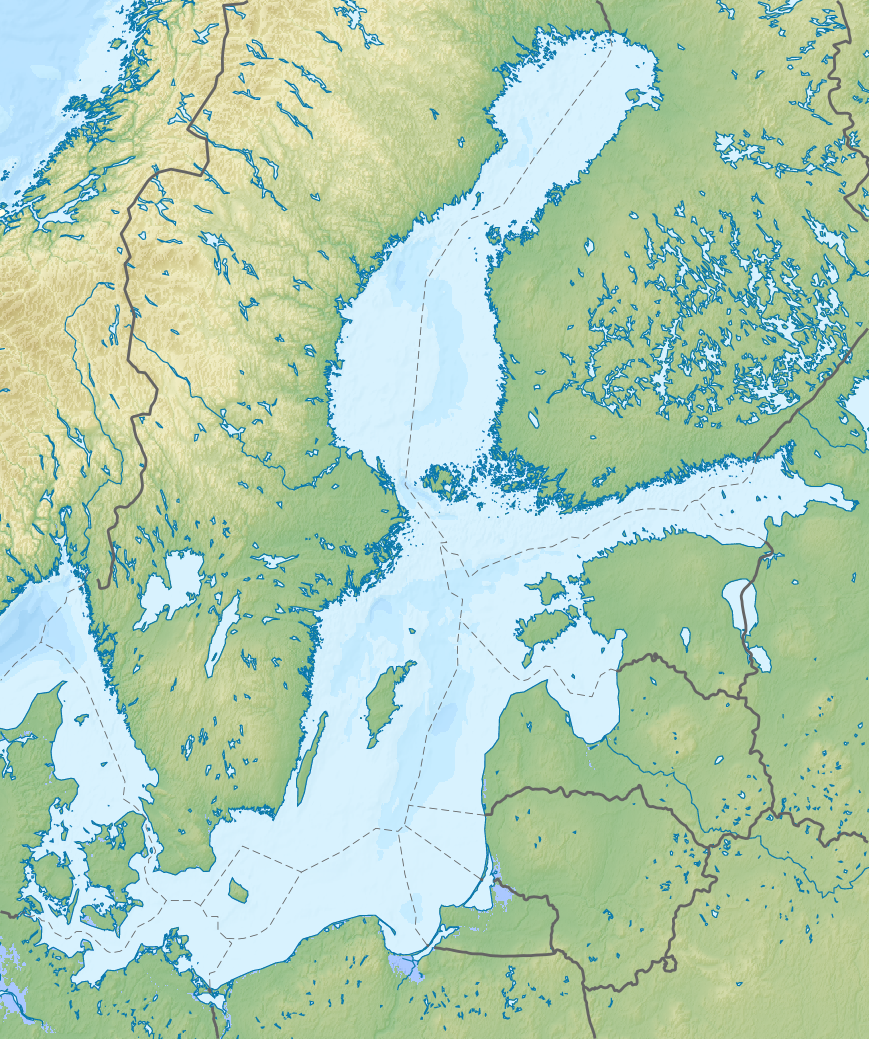
- Location within Lithuania Battle of Saule (Baltic states) Battle of Saule (Baltic Sea)

The Battle of Saule (Lithuanian: Saulės mūšis / Šiaulių mūšis; German: Schlacht von Schaulen; Latvian: Saules kauja) was fought on 22 September 1236, between the Livonian Brothers of the Sword and pagan troops of Samogitians and Semigallians. Between 48 and 60 knights were killed, including the Livonian Master, Volkwin. It was the earliest large-scale defeat suffered by the orders in Baltic lands. The Sword-Brothers, the first Catholic military order established in the Baltic lands, was soundly defeated, and its remnants accepted incorporation into the Teutonic Order in 1237. The battle inspired rebellions among the Curonians, Semigallians, Selonians, and Oeselians, tribes previously conquered by the Sword-Brothers. Some thirty years' worth of conquests on the left bank of Daugava were reversed. To commemorate the battle, in 2000, the Lithuanian and Latvian parliaments declared 22 September to be the Baltic Unity Day.

== Background ==
The Sword-Brothers were established in 1202 in Riga to conquer and convert pagan Baltic tribes to Christianity. By the 1230s, under the leadership of Master Volkwin, the order was coping with strained financial resources, decreasing manpower, and an ill reputation. The order was in conflict with the papacy under Pope Gregory IX and the Holy Roman Emperor, two of its biggest supporters, over Estonia. However, on 19 February 1236, Pope Gregory IX issued a papal bull declaring a crusade against Lithuania. Volkwin was reluctant to launch offensive actions against Lithuanian lands. His reluctance was determined by understanding that the order lacked strength to wage war against the Lithuanians. The lack of strength was a result of internal conflicts with the Bishopric of Riga. Besides that, the Livonian Sword Brothers still had little knowledge of the lands lying south of the order's territory. Volkwin delayed starting military actions for an entire summer, hoping to escape a risky operation into unexplored lands. However, the insistence of Pope Gregory IX forced him to lead a new campaign. Volkwin targeted Samogitia, planning to conquer the coast of the Baltic Sea and connect with the Teutonic Knights in Prussia. The Sword-Brothers wanted to keep expanding along the Daugava River and were reluctant to march against Samogitia. In the fall of 1236, a party of crusaders from Holstein arrived in Riga and demanded to be led into a battle. Volkwin gathered a large war party, which included troops from Pskov Republic, Livonians, Latgallians, Curonians, and Estonians.

The Livonian Confederation in 1260, showing the Battle of Saule near Šiauliai

== Events of the battle ==
Crossing the lands of Semigallians, which were not in the order's control, the crusaders marched southward into Samogitia, raiding and plundering local settlements. The locals only had a few days to gather troops for defense. On the knights' northward return, however, they encountered a determined group of Samogitians at a river crossing. Unwilling to risk losing their horses in the swampland, the Holsteiners refused to fight on foot, forcing the knights to camp for the night. The next morning, on the day of Saint Maurice, the main pagan forces, possibly led by Duke Vykintas, arrived at the camp. The Lithuanian light cavalry flung javelins at short range, which were highly effective against the unwieldy Livonian heavy cavalry. The swampy terrain was advantageous for the lightly armed pagans. The slaughter of the Christian troops, including Volkwin, sowed the seeds of confusion in the Livonian ranks. The lightly armed native forces under the command of the Brothers soon fled from the battle. Almost all members of the order, including Volkwin, died in the battle. Those crusaders and knights who tried to flee to Riga were allegedly killed by the Semigallians. Only every tenth Crusader reached Riga.

The Livonian Rhymed Chronicle described the pagan's defeat of the Sword-Brothers at the battle of Saule: "More heathens arrived. The next day the Christians thought to ride away early, but they had to fight the pagans though they did not want to. In the swamp, they could offer but weak resistance, and they were cut down like women. I lament the deaths of so many heroes who were so easily slain. The Master and his Brothers put up a heroic defense until their horses were slain and even then fought on foot and felled many men before they were vanquished. Finally, and with great difficulty, the Lithuanians felled them with long spears."

== Location ==
The exact location where the battle took place is unknown. The Chronicum Livoniae by Hermann de Wartberge mentioned that the battle was fought in terram Sauleorum. Traditionally, this was identified with Šiauliai (German: Schaulen, Latvian: Šauļi) in Lithuania or with the small town of Vecsaule, near Bauska, in what is today southern Latvia. In 1965, the German historian Friedrich Benninghoven proposed Jauniūnai village in Joniškis district, Lithuania, as the battle site. The theory gained some academic support and in 2010, the Lithuanian government sponsored construction of a memorial in Jauniūnai – a 29-metre (95 ft) tall sundial, a pond, and a park of oaks. The village of Pamūšis, situated some 10 kilometres (6.2 mi) east of Janiūnai on the Mūša River, also claims to be the location of the battle. Saule/Saulė means "the Sun" in both Latvian and Lithuanian, and is the name of the Baltic Sun goddess.

== See also ==
- Battle of Durbe
