= Samogitian =

Samogitian may refer to:

- Anything pertaining to Samogitia (Žemaitija), the Lowlands of Lithuania
- Samogitians, inhabitants of Samogitia
- Samogitian dialect, a dialect of the Lithuanian language, sometimes regarded as a separate language
