= Almena =

Almena may refer to:

== In the United States ==
- Almena, Kansas
- Almena, Wisconsin
- Almena (town), Wisconsin
- Almena Township, Michigan

== Elsewhere ==
- Almena, Extertal, Germany
- Almena, Spain
