= Jēkabs Bīne =

Latvian artist and educationist

- Born: 11 April 1895; Riga, Governorate of Livonia
- Died: 24 October 1955 (aged 60); Riga, Latvian SSR
- Education: Art Academy of Latvia
- Occupation: Artist

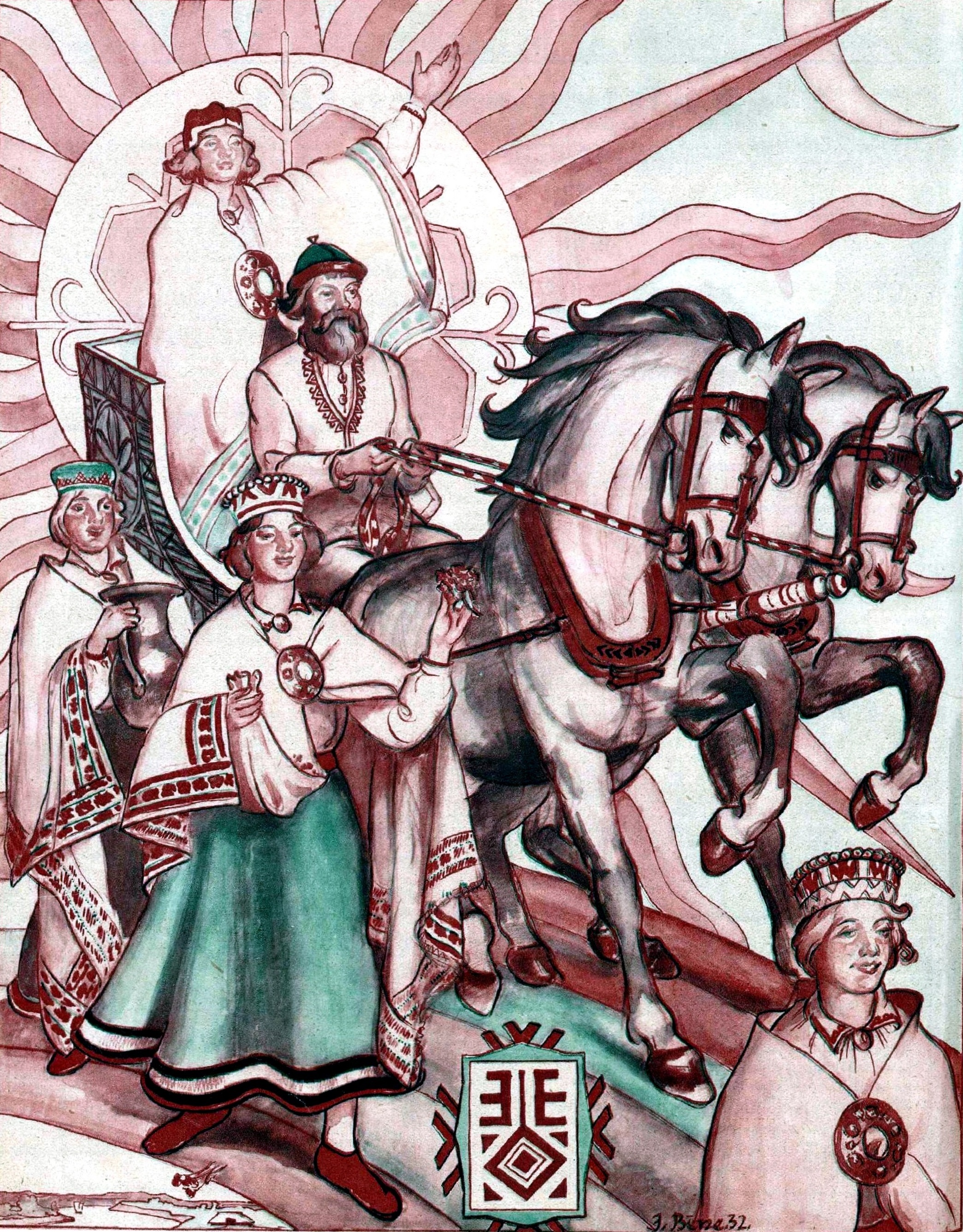
Sun Bearer Ūsiņš, by Jēkabs Bīne, 1934

Jēkabs Bīne (11 April 1895 – 24 October 1955) was a Latvian painter, stained glass artist, teacher and art critic.

== Biography ==
Jēkabs Bīne was born in Riga in 1895 in merchant family. He studied at the Riga City Art School (1913–1915), Kharkov Art School (1915–1918) and the Art Academy of Latvia (1921–1926). His graduation work from Jānis Tilbergs' figurative painting class at the Art Academy was the painting Resurrection. He held teaching positions throughout his life: at the Art Studio of the Latvian People University (1928–1940), Riga People University, Institute of Housekeeping in Kaucminde (1932–1939), at the Riga State Art of Craft School (1933–1944), at the School of the Riga society of painters (1936–1939), at the Art Academy of Latvia (1942–1944), at the Kuldiga Secondary Art School (1944–1951), and at combine "Art" (1951–1955).

His first solo exhibition was held in 1917. In the 1920s he painted Christian subjects, including the altarpieces for the churches in Cesvaine (1924), Jumprava (1926) and Vecsaule (1927). His focus on sacral painting developed into an interest in Latvian mythology, idealism and an ambition to connect art to folk culture and nature. He studied the symbols of Latvian ornamentation and incorporated this in his art. He became involved in Ernests Brastiņš' neopagan movement Dievturība and became one of its main public promoters.

From 1940 and throughout the Stalinist era, this was repressed as "bourgeois art". Bīne's diaries show that he was disappointed with the direction the Soviet authorities set out for the arts, and that he viewed it as vulgarization. He did however adapt to the new regime. As part of his acceptance of a position as a stained glass specialist in 1951, he wrote a 1952 paper titled Ornament in which he condemned his previous views on Latvian ornamentation.

Bīne was the father of the actress Iza Bīne (1928–2006). He died in Riga on 24 October 1955.

== Legacy ==
Bīne's 1931 painting Dievs, Māra, Laima, depicting three gods from Latvian mythology, remains one of the most prominent examples of Dievturi iconography. A book about Bīne by the art historian Agita Gritāne was published in 2020. The same year, an exhibition of his works was held in Kuldīga to commemorate the 125th anniversary of his birth.
