= Battle of Durbe =

1260 battle of the Livonian Crusade

- Part of the Livonian Crusade
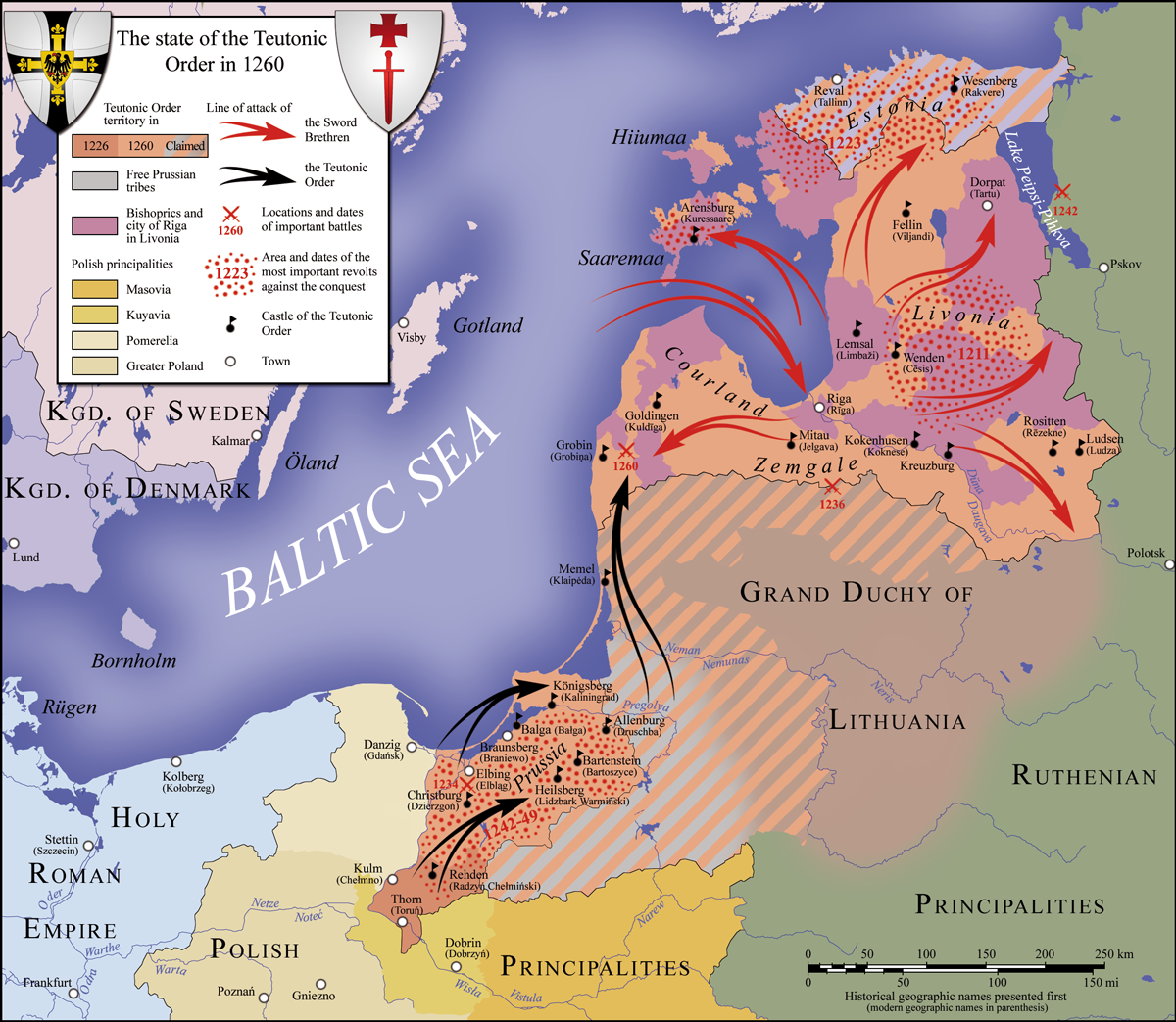
- Military activities of the Teutonic Knights in the 13th century
Date	13 July 1260
Location	Near Durbe 56°35′42″N 21°21′00″E
Result	Samogitian and Curonian victory

Belligerents
Samogitians; Curonians	Livonian Order, Teutonic Knights, platoons of Swedes, Danes, Old Prussians

Commanders and leaders
Treniota or Alminas	Burkhard von Hornhausen †

Strength
Around 4,000	Around 8,000 and 190 knights (initially)

Casualties and losses
Unknown	150 knights

Baltic tribes at the beginning of the 13th century before the orders started their crusade

The Battle of Durbe (Latvian: Durbes kauja, Lithuanian: Durbės mūšis, German: Schlacht an der Durbe) was a medieval battle fought near Durbe, 23 km (14 mi) east of Liepāja, in present-day Latvia during the Livonian Crusade. On 13 July 1260, the Samogitians soundly defeated the joint forces of the Teutonic Knights from Prussia and the Livonian Order from Livonia. Some 150 knights were killed, including Livonian master Burkhard von Hornhausen and Prussian land marshal Heinrich Botel. It was by far the largest defeat of the knights in the 13th century: in the second-largest, the Battle of Aizkraukle, 71 knights were killed. The battle inspired the Great Prussian Uprising (ended in 1274) and the rebellions of the Semigallians (surrendered in 1290), the Couronians (surrendered in 1267), and the Oeselians (surrendered in 1261). The battle undid two decades of Livonian conquests and it took some thirty years for the Livonian Order to restore its control.

== Background ==
The Livonian Order had been fighting the Samogitians since 1253, when Mindaugas was crowned as King of Lithuania and transferred parts of Samogitia to the order. The Samogitians did not recognize the transfer and fought for their independence. For the knights, Samogitia was a strategically important region as it physically separated their Prussian and Livonian branches. After the Samogitians killed 12 knights in the Battle of Memel, near the newly built Memel Castle (Klaipėda) in 1257, a two-year truce was concluded. Once the truce expired, the Samogitians invaded Courland and defeated the knights in the Battle of Skuodas in 1259. The success encouraged the Semigallians to rebel. The knights attempted to strengthen their strategic position and attacked Tērvete (Terwerten) hoping to turn the Semigallian outpost into a Teutonic castle. When the attack failed, they built a fortress in nearby Dobele (Doblen) and Georgenburg (possibly present-day Jurbarkas) in Samogitia. The Semigallians attacked Dobele, but, due to poor siege tactics, suffered heavy casualties. The Samogitians did not attack Georgenburg directly but built a fortress nearby, cutting off the castle from its supplies and continuously harassing the garrison.

== Battle ==
Livonian grand master Burkhard von Hornhausen organized a large army for a campaign against the Samogitians. On 25 January 1260, the knights obtained a papal bull from Pope Alexander IV, blessing the crusade, and concluded a peace treaty with Siemowit I of Masovia. When the armies of the Prussian and Livonian orders and their allies met in Memel Castle, they planned to reinforce the besieged Georgenburg. However, they learned that a large Samogitian force was raiding Courland, and the knights decided to march towards present-day Latvia to stop the Samogitians. The enemies met on the southern shore of Durbe Lake.

The knights were plagued by internal disagreements. For example, Danes from Estonia refused to dismount from their heavy horses, which were not well-suited for battle in swampy terrain. When the battle started, local Curonians abandoned the knights because the knights did not agree to free any captured Curonians from the Samogitian camp. Peter von Dusburg even alleged that the Curonians attacked the knights from the rear. The Estonians and other local people soon fled the battle. After this loss the knights were surrounded and suffered heavy losses. Some 150 knights perished along with hundreds of secular knights and low-ranking soldiers.

Though the battle is described in the Livonian Rhymed Chronicle in detail, no contemporary sources mention who was the leader of the Samogitians. Only Simon Grunau, in his chronicle written ca. 1517–1526, mentioned that it was Treniota. In 1982, historian Edvardas Gudavičius published a study arguing that Treniota was not a Samogitian and could not have commanded a Samogitian army. Inga Baranauskienė argued that the battle was led by Alminas, a Samogitian elder elected before 1256.

== Aftermath ==
Numerous rebellions against the Teutonic Order across all Baltic lands followed, including the Great Prussian Uprising, which lasted from 1260 to 1274. Zemgale rebelled for 30 years while Courland surrendered in 1267. The Curonians, together with the Samogitians, attacked Teutonic castles west of the Venta River. On 3 February 1261, on their way back, the pagans again defeated the knights, near Lielvārde (Lennenwarden), killing 10. The Oeselian rebellion was suppressed in 1261. These battles undid some 20 years of Livonian conquest and it took some thirty years for the Livonian Order to restore its control.

In the aftermath of the defeat, Duke Treniota is alleged to have convinced his uncle Mindaugas, King of Lithuania, to deny his Christianity and break the peace with the Teutonic Order. Treniota organized military campaigns into Livonia and earned support from the Lithuanians. In 1263, Treniota assassinated Mindaugas and usurped the Lithuanian throne, and the nation reverted to paganism. Ensuing instability prevented the Grand Duchy of Lithuania from taking full advantage of the weakened orders, however, while the orders were occupied reconquering rebelling territories and did not pose a danger to Lithuania until 1280–1285. In this sense, the battle bought time for the new Lithuanian state to mature, strengthen, and expand before facing a full-scale crusade.
