= Vecsaule Parish =

Parish of Latvia

- parish of Latvia
- Coat of arms

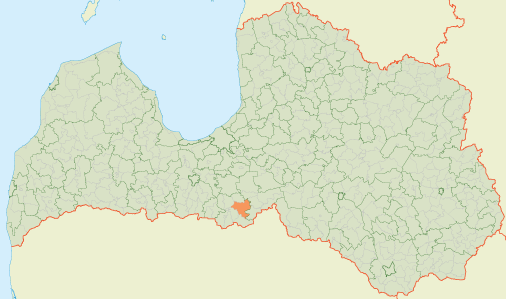
- 56°25′08″N 24°25′14″E
- Country: Latvia

Area
  - Total: 164.25 km^{2} (63.42 sq mi)
  - Land: 160.42 km^{2} (61.94 sq mi)
  - Water: 3.83 km^{2} (1.48 sq mi)

Population (1 January 2024)
  - Total: 1,757
  - Density: 11/km^{2} (28/sq mi)

Vecsaule Parish (Latvian: Vecsaules pagasts) is an administrative unit of Bauska Municipality in the Semigallia region of Latvia. Through the parish flows Lambārtes, Iecava and Mēmele River.

== History ==
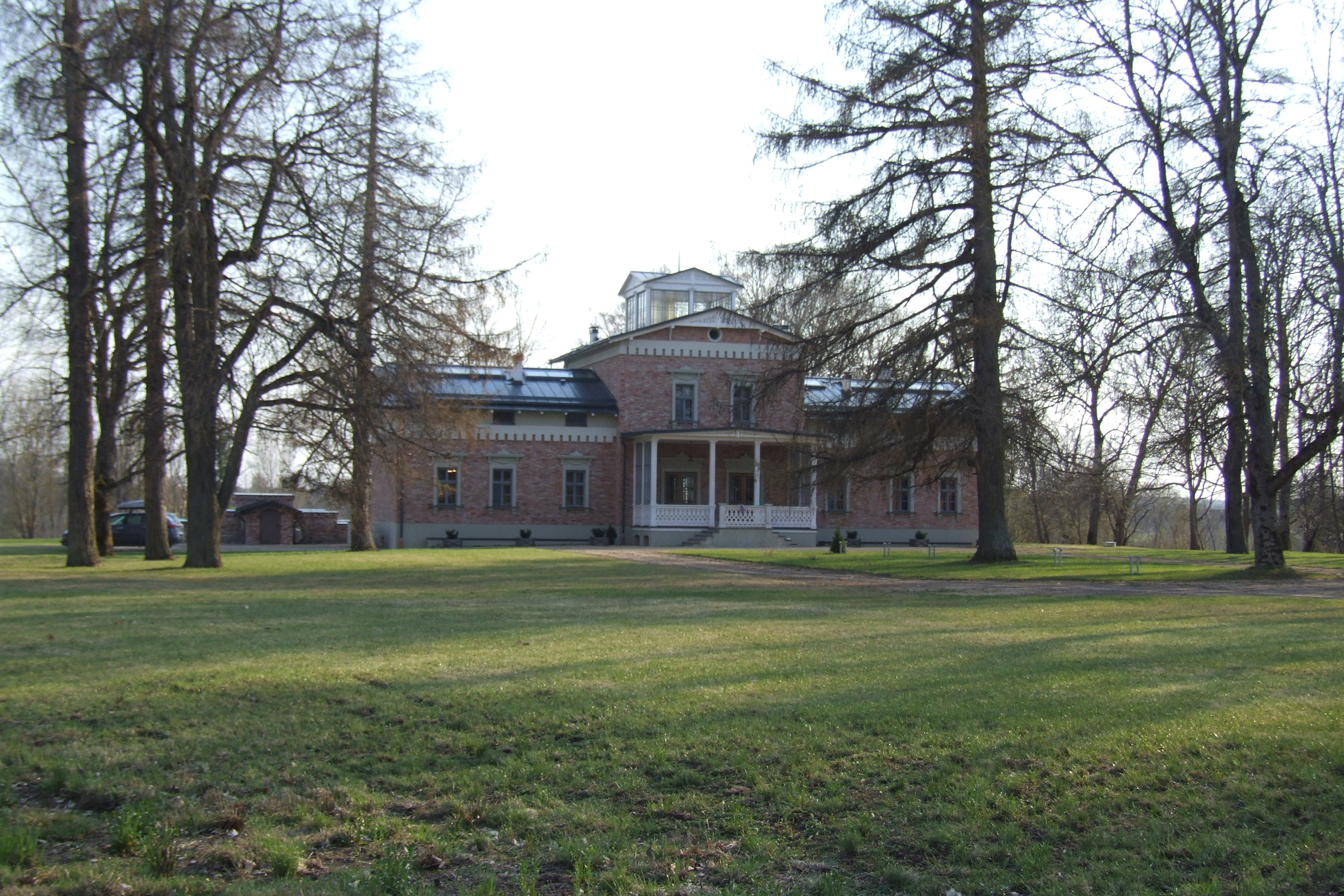
Jaunsaule muiža (Neu-Rahden) in 2011 after reconstruction.

Battle of Saule, that took place in 1236, traditionally was identified with Šiauliai (German: Schaulen, Latvian: Šauļi) in Lithuania or with the small settlement of Vecsaule near Bauska in what is today southern Latvia.

On the territory of present-day Vecsaule parish there were historically located Kūlu manor (Gut Kuhlmannshof), Mazmēmeles manor (Gut Klein-Memelhof), Pēter manor (Gut Peterhof), Old Manor (Vecmuiža, Gut Althof , Jaunsaule Neu-Rahden), Vecsaules Manor ( Gut Alt-Rahden , Vecsaule). In 1935 Vecsaule Parish had an area of 113.6 km^{2} and had a population of 1888. In 1945, the Mazsaules village was established in the parish and Vecsaule village council, was liquidated in 1949. In 1954 the Mazsaules village was added, in 1961 Soviet farm s «Dāviņi» territory was added Brukna village In 1963, part of the liquidated Brukna village was added, in 1977 part of Skaistkalne Parish was added, and in 1979 - part of Barbele village. In 1990, the village was reorganized into a parish. In 2009 Vecsaule Parish was included as an administrative territory Bauska Municipality.

== Towns, villages and settlements of Vecsaule parish ==
The largest settlements are Vecsaule (Parish Center) Jaunsaule, Kaģeni, Peat, Likverteni, Lici, Mazbrukna, Melderi, Ozolaine Petermuiza, Rīkani, Strautiņi.
