= Klaipėda Castle Jazz Festival =

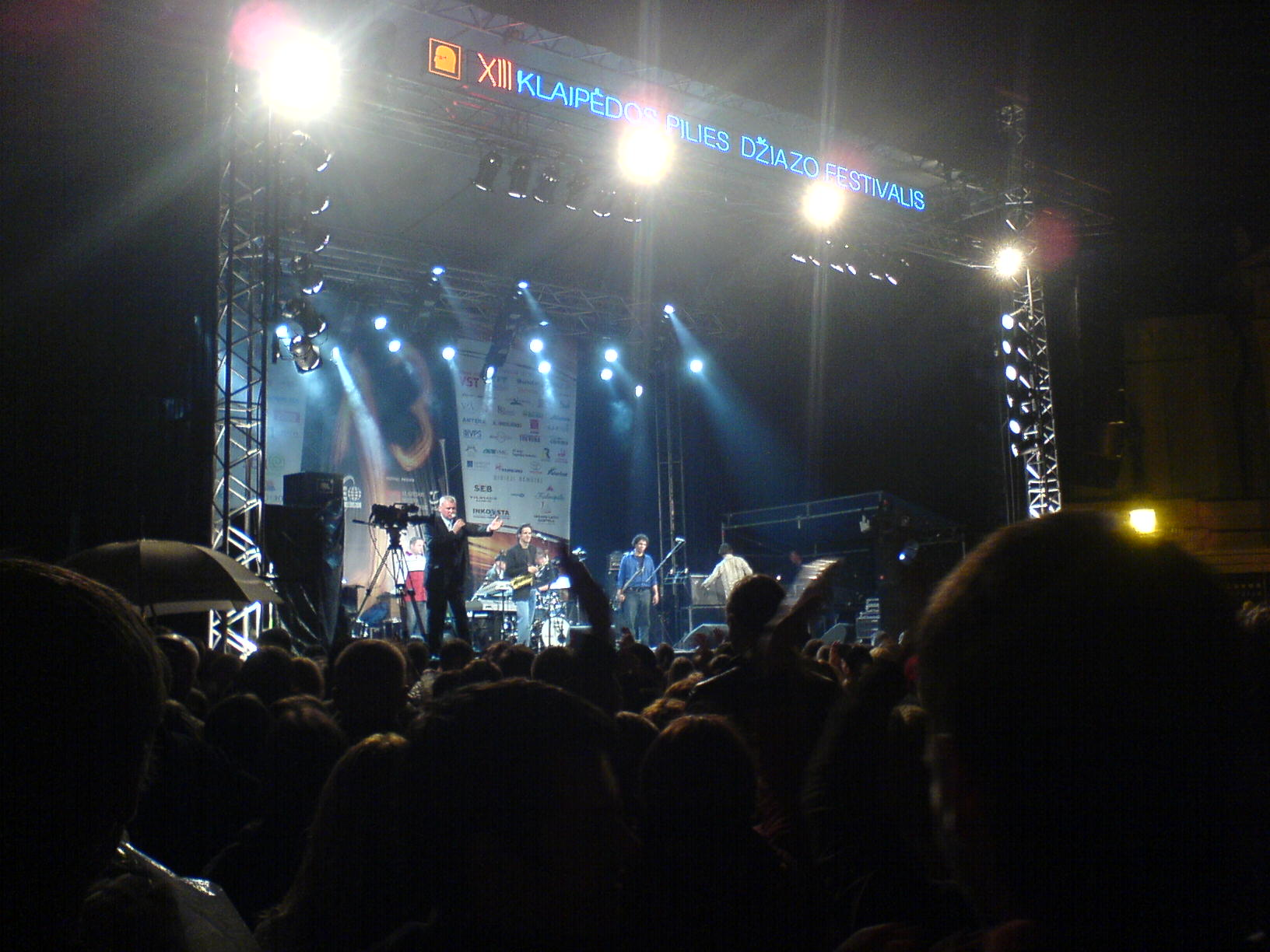
XIII Klaipėda Castle Jazz Festival

The Klaipėda Castle Jazz Festival (Lithuanian: Klaipėdos pilies džiazo festivalis) has been held annually during June or July in Klaipėda, Lithuania since 1994. It is staged near the ruined Klaipėda Castle. Major international performers at past festivals have included Maynard Ferguson, Toots Thielemans, Billy Cobham Culture Mix, Mike Mainieri, Victor Bailey, Chico & the Gypsies, Soweto Kinch, Alex Wilson, and Nikki Yeoh, among others. It traditionally features open air performances and an all-night jam session.

== History ==
The Klaipėda Castle Jazz Festival has been held annually during June or July in Klaipėda, Lithuania since 1994. It is staged near the ruined Klaipėda Castle, but also includes some performances in Vilnius and Palanga. The festival features open-air performances and an all-night jam session. The event was initially held in June, however in 2007 it was delayed until July for the first time, in the hopes of experiencing better weather. The festival is part of the European Jazz Network.

When it was founded, the festival featured Lithuanian musicians, and then later expanded to include international performers.

Major international performers at past festivals have included Maynard Ferguson, Toots Thielemans, Billy Cobham Culture Mix, Mike Mainieri, Victor Bailey, Chico & the Gypsies, Soweto Kinch, Alex Wilson, and Nikki Yeoh, among others. In 2007, acts included Maceo Parker, Randy Crawford, Joe Sample and Sugar Blue.

The 2025 festival has returned to the June timeslot, and will take place over three days, and include events in the town centre, the St. Francis of Assisi Church in Klaipeda, and Gargzdai park amphitheater.
