= Turtle Lake, Wisconsin =

- Village
- Location of Turtle Lake in Barron County and Polk County, Wisconsin
- Coordinates: 45°20′39″N 92°5′50″W
- Country: United States
- State: Wisconsin
- Counties: Barron, Polk

Area
  - Total: 3.00 sq mi (7.78 km^{2})
  - Land: 2.86 sq mi (7.41 km^{2})
  - Water: 0.14 sq mi (0.37 km^{2})
- Elevation: 1,171 ft (357 m)

Population (2020)
  - Total: 1,037
  - Density: 362/sq mi (140/km^{2})
- Time zone: UTC-6 (Central (CST))
  - Summer (DST): UTC-5 (CDT)
- Area codes: 715 & 534
- FIPS code: 55-81100
- GNIS feature ID: 1575742
- Website: www.turtlelakewi.com

Turtle Lake is a village in Barron and Polk counties in the U.S. state of Wisconsin. Its population was 1,037 at the 2020 census. Of these, 959 were in Barron County, and 78 were in Polk County. The village is located between the towns of Almena, in Barron County, and Beaver, in Polk County.

== Geography ==
Turtle Lake is located at 45°23′47″N 92°8′49″W (45.396604, -92.146974).

According to the United States Census Bureau, the village has a total area of 3.01 square miles (7.80 km^{2}), of which 0.14 square miles (0.36 km^{2}) is covered by water.

== Demographics ==
Historical population
Census	Pop.	Note	%±
1900	324		—
1910	442		36.4%
1920	679		53.6%
1930	527		−22.4%
1940	616		16.9%
1950	696		13.0%
1960	691		−0.7%
1970	637		−7.8%
1980	762		19.6%
1990	817		7.2%
2000	1,065		30.4%
2010	1,050		−1.4%
2020	1,037		−1.2%
U.S. Decennial Census

=== 2010 census ===
As of the census of 2010, 1,050 people, 492 households, and 256 families were living in the village. The population density was 365.9 inhabitants per square mile (141.3/km^{2}). The 535 housing units had an average density of 186.4 per square mile (72.0/km^{2}). The racial makeup of the village was 92.4% White, 0.2% African American, 4.6% Native American, 0.6% Asian, 0.5% from other races, and 1.8% from two or more races. Hispanics or Latinos of any race were 1.7% of the population.

Of the 492 households, 26.2% had children under 18 living with them, 33.1% were married couples living together, 14.0% had a female householder with no husband present, 4.9% had a male householder with no wife present, and 48.0% were not families. About 40.9% of all households were made up of individuals, and 19.1% had someone living alone who was 65 or older. The average household size was 2.13, and the average family size was 2.86.

The median age in the village was 38.9 years. 22.1% of residents were under the age of 18; 8.4% were between the ages of 18 and 24; 26% were from 25 to 44; 26.2% were from 45 to 64; and 17.3% were 65 years of age or older. The gender makeup of the village was 48.0% male and 52.0% female.

=== 2000 census ===
As of the census of 2000, 1,065 people, 475 households, and 268 families resided in the village. The population density was 380.7 people per square mile (146.9/km^{2}). The 508 housing units had an average density of 181.6 per square mile (70.1/km^{2}). The racial makeup of the village was 94.37% White, 4.51% Native American, 0.28% Asian, and 0.85% from two or more races. Hispanic or Latino persons of any race were 1.03% of the population.

Of the 475 households, 30.7% had children under 18 living with them, 37.5% were married couples living together, 14.5% had a female householder with no husband present, and 43.4% were not families. About 38.5% of all households were made up of individuals, and 16.6% had someone living alone who was 65 or older. The average household size was 2.24, and the average family size was 2.92.

In the village, age distribution was 26.1% under 18, 10.5% from 18 to 24, 25.2% from 25 to 44, 20.6% from 45 to 64, and 17.7% who were 65 or older. The median age was 38 years. For every 100 females, there were 91.2 males. For every 100 females age 18 and over, there were 90.1 males.

The median income for a household in the village was $29,485, and for a family was $36,875. Males had a median income of $28,750 versus $19,167 for females. The per capita income for the village was $16,591. About 12.9% of families and 16.5% of the population were below the poverty line, including 16.5% of those under 18 and 21.0% of those 65 or over.

== Transportation ==
- U.S. Highway 8
- U.S. Highway 63

U.S. Highways 8 and 63 intersect in Turtle Lake.

The nearest commercial airline services are offered by the Chippewa Valley Regional Airport in Eau Claire and Minneapolis-St. Paul International Airport in Minneapolis.

== Entertainment ==
Turtle Lake is home to the St. Croix Casino Turtle Lake. Guests can gamble on over 1,100 slots, craps, roulette, live poker, and blackjack games. The casino is host to multiple restaurants and an events center that has many events year-round. The casino also offers a shuttle service to most places of interest throughout the Village of Turtle Lake.

== Festivals ==
The Turtle Lake Inter County Fair is held annually the second weekend in July. The fair is held from Friday-Sunday. Events include horse, truck, and tractor pulls, carnival rides, live bands, foot races, pedal pulls, cattle and dairy shows, a turtle derby, and a grand parade. The fair offers free admission.

== Media ==
The Turtle Lake Times provides newspaper services for Turtle Lake and the surrounding area.

== Education ==
The School District of Turtle Lake is the area school, providing education from kindergarten through grade 12. Wisconsin Indianhead Technical College-Rice Lake and UW-Barron County, which both provide higher education for the area, are located in nearby Rice Lake.

== In popular culture ==
Parts of the film Clear Lake, WI, starring Michael Madsen, were filmed in Turtle Lake.
