= Kazys Almenas =

Lithuanian physicist, writer, essayist, and publisher

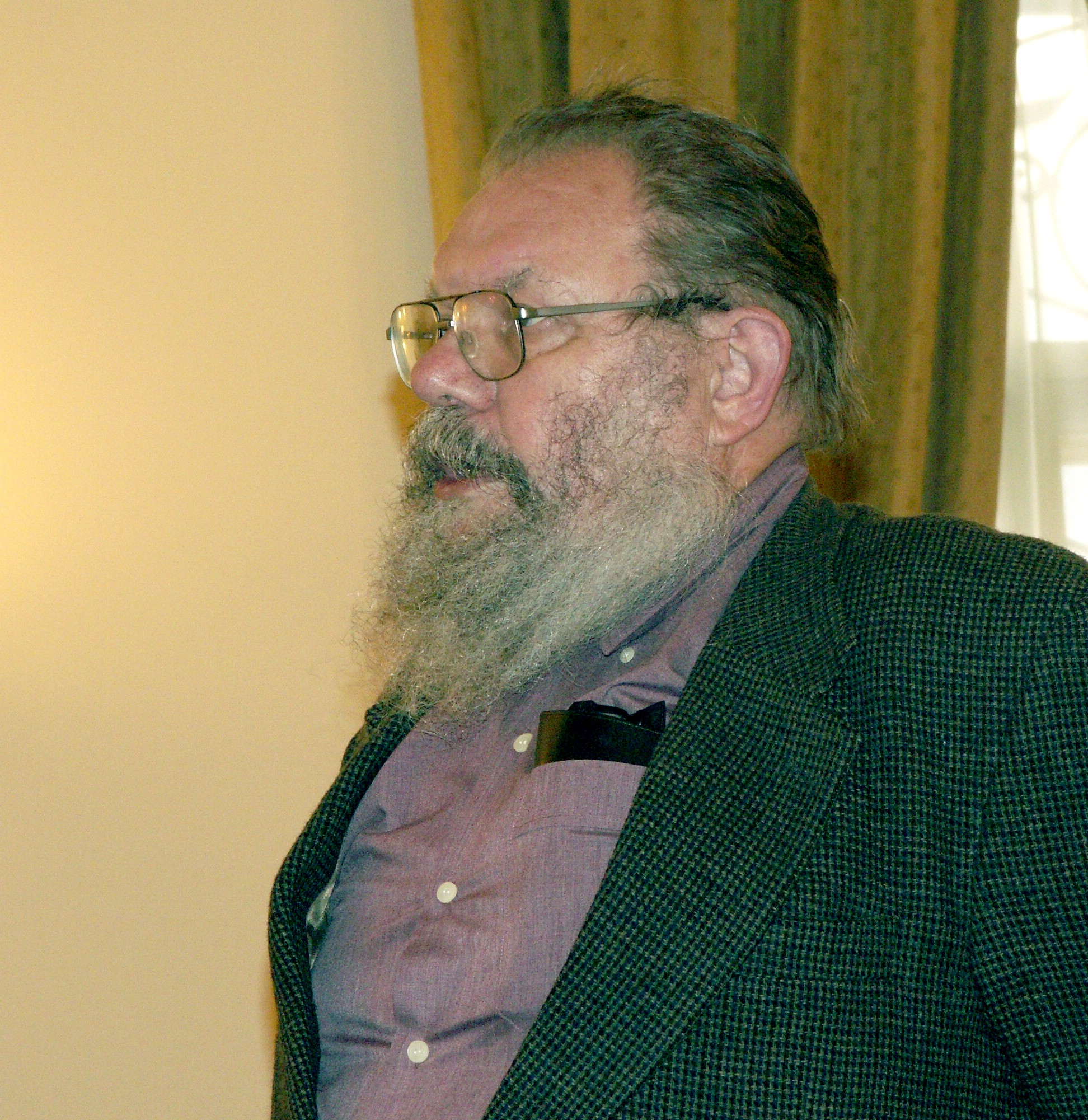
Kazys Almenas.

Kazys Almenas (11 April 1935 – 7 October 2017) was a Lithuanian physicist, writer, essayist, and publisher.

== Biography ==
Kazys Almenas was born in Gruzdžiai, Šiauliai County, Lithuania. In his memoir Anuomet he wrote that his birth name was Alminas and he changed the letter 'i' to 'e' when accepting the American citizenship in order to restore the Samogitian spelling of the surname. He attended the University of Nebraska and Northwestern University. Between 1965 and 1967, he studied at the University of Warsaw and received a doctorate in physics. Almenas was teaching at the University of Maryland.

Almenas used to live in Lithuania and often published his essays in the Lithuanian press. Kazys Almenas is the founder of Fund Supporting Royal Palace (Valdovų rūmų paramos fondas) - a fund which helps financing a replica of a medieval Lithuanian Royal Palace in Vilnius.

== Literary works ==
Almenas wrote the novels Upė į Rytus, upė į Šiaurę (1964), Šienapjūtė (1970), Sauja skatikų (1977), and Lietingos dienos Palangoje (1988) and the collections of short stories Bėgiai (1965) and Gyvenimas tai kekė vyšnių (1967), Vaivos juosta (2014).
