= Wenno von Rohrbach =

Master of the Livonian Brothers of the Sword

1st Master of the Livonian Brothers of the Sword
- In office 1204–1209
- Preceded by: Position established
- Succeeded by: Volkwin Schenk

Wenno von Rohrbach, also known as Winno, Vinno, and Winne, was the first Master (Herrenmeister) of the Livonian Brothers of the Sword, leading the Order from 1204 to 1209.

== Death ==
Originally from Kassel-Naumburg, Wenno was killed by the knight Wickbert with an axe, in a quarrel caused by some unknown reason. As a result, Wickbert was sentenced to death. Wenno was succeeded by Volkwin Schenk.
