= Heinrich von Heimburg =

Master of the Livonian Order (1246–1248)

Landmeister Heinrich von Heimburg
- Master of the Livonian Order
- Elected: 1246
- In office: 1246–1248
- Predecessor: Dietrich von Grüningen
- Successor: Andreas von Velven

Personal details
- Born: Heimburg, County of Regenstein, Kingdom of Germany, Holy Roman Empire
- Died: Kingdom of Germany, Holy Roman Empire
- Denomination: Roman Catholic

Heinrich von Heimburg (Note: Alternatively Heinrich von Hinnenberg) (fl. 13th century) was Master of the Livonian Order from 1246 to 1248.

== Biography ==
Heinrich heralded from Heimburg, then ruled by the Counts of Regenstein, the scion of a powerful Saxon family of ex-ministeriales. He is first mentioned as a Teutonic Knight in 1239, being stationed in Langeln. He enjoyed close relations with Duke Otto I of Brunswick-Lüneburg, who described Heinrich as a dear friend. He is mentioned as accompanying Conrad of Thuringia, the then Teutonic Grandmaster, at Mergentheim in 1240.

In 1246, he was elected Master of the Livonian Order, succeeding Dietrich von Grüningen. After a tenure of two years, he returned to Germany in 1248. He was succeeded by the former Master of Livonia, Andreas von Velven.
