= Almena (town), Wisconsin =

Town in Barron County, Wisconsin

Almena, Wisconsin
- Town
- Town of Almena
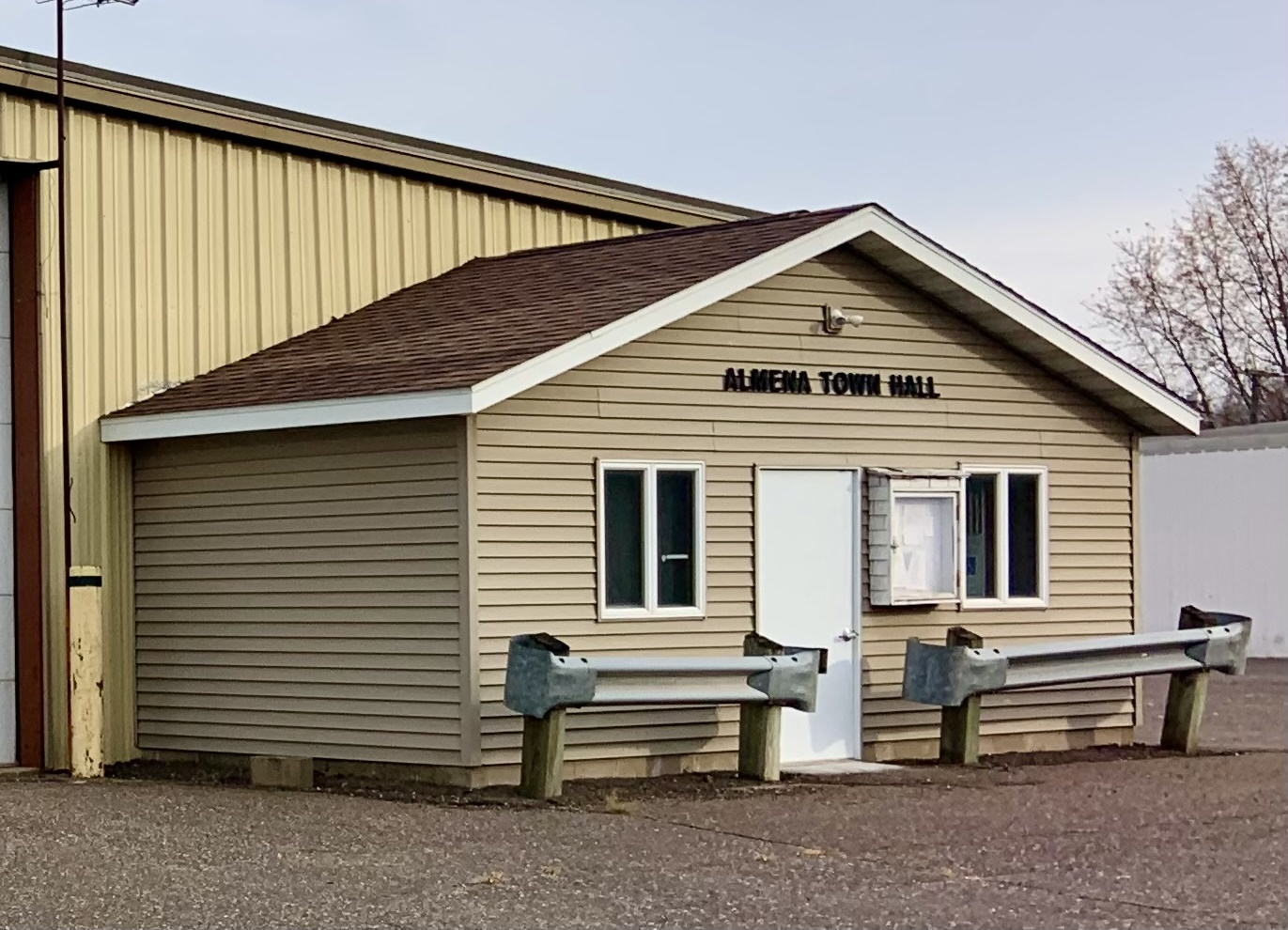
- Almena Town Hall

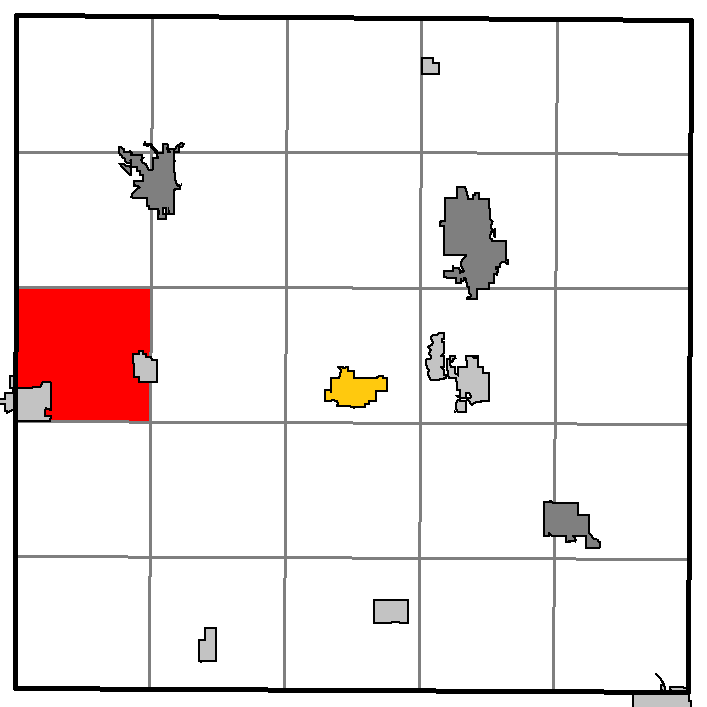
- Location of Almena, within Barron County, Wisconsin

- Location of Barron County, Wisconsin
- Coordinates: 45°26′15″N 92°06′25″W
- Country: United States
- State: Wisconsin
- County: Barron

Area
  - Total: 32.44 sq mi (84.0 km^{2})
  - Land: 30.53 sq mi (79.1 km^{2})
  - Water: 1.91 sq mi (4.9 km^{2})

Population (2020)
  - Total: 887
  - Density: 29.1/sq mi (11.2/km^{2})
- Time zone: UTC-6 (Central (CST))
  - Summer (DST): UTC-5 (CDT)
- ZIP Code: 54805
- Area code(s): 715 & 534
- GNIS feature ID: 1582680
- Website: townofalmena.com

The Town of Almena is in Barron County in the U.S. state of Wisconsin. The population was 887 at the 2020 census, up from 858 at the 2010 census. The village of Almena is partially located within the town.

== Geography ==
The town is located along the western edge of Barron County; its western border is the Polk County line. The village of Almena is located along the eastern edge of the town, and the village of Turtle Lake is in the southwestern corner.

U.S. Route 8 crosses the town from east to west through the villages of Almena and Turtle Lake. It is 10 miles (16 km) east to Barron and 26 miles (42 km) west to St. Croix Falls. U.S. Route 63 crosses the town diagonally from Turtle Lake in the southwest to the northern border; the highway leads 7 miles (11 km) northeast to Cumberland and 13 miles (21 km) southwest to Clear Lake.

According to the United States Census Bureau, the town has a total area of 32.4 square miles (83.8 km^{2}), of which 30.5 square miles (78.9 km^{2}) is land and 1.9 square miles (4.9 km^{2}), or 5.88%, is water. Upper and Lower Turtle Lakes are the largest water bodies in the town, followed by Echo Lake and the eastern end of Horseshoe Lake.

== Demographics ==
As of the census of 2000, there were 910 people, 355 households, and 301 families residing in the town. The population density was 29.7 people per square mile (11.5/km^{2}). There were 662 housing units at an average density of 21.6 per square mile (8.3/km^{2}). The racial makeup of the town was 99.78% White, 0.11% Native American, and 0.11% from two or more races. Hispanic or Latino people of any race were 0.33% of the population.

There were 355 households, out of which 29.0% had children under the age of 18 living with them, 74.1% were married couples living together, 3.9% had a female householder with no husband present, and 15.2% were non-families. 13.5% of all households were made up of individuals, and 5.4% had someone living alone who was 65 years of age or older. The average household size was 2.56 and the average family size was 2.80.

In the town, the population was spread out, with 21.1% under the age of 18, 6.6% from 18 to 24, 26.2% from 25 to 44, 30.5% from 45 to 64, and 15.6% who were 65 years of age or older. The median age was 42 years. For every 100 females, there were 109.7 males. For every 100 females aged 18 and over, there were 115.0 males.

The median income for a household in the town was $42,833, and the median income for a family was $45,833. Males had a median income of $30,278 versus $25,625 for females. The per capita income for the town was $21,211. About 6.3% of families and 6.4% of the population were below the poverty line, including 3.8% of those under age 18 and 9.5% of those aged 65 or over.
