= Almena, Wisconsin =

- Village
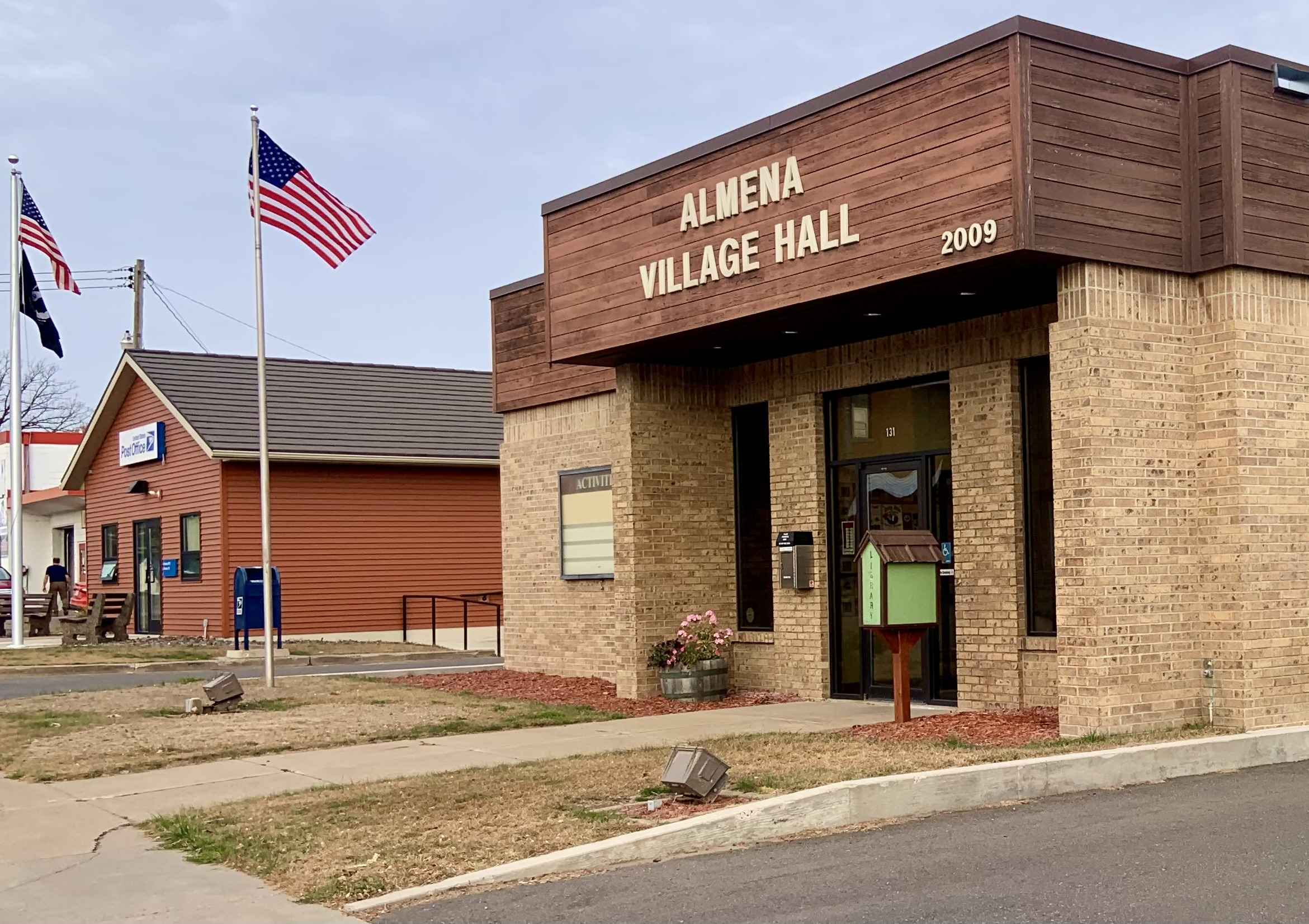
- Village hall

- Location of Almena in Barron County, Wisconsin
- Coordinates: 45°25′27″N 92°5′31″W
- Country: United States
- State: Wisconsin
- County: Barron

Government
  - Mayor: Alan Gabe

Area
  - Total: 1.13 sq mi (2.93 km^{2})
  - Land: 1.13 sq mi (2.93 km^{2})
  - Water: 0 sq mi (0.00 km^{2})
- Elevation: 1,211 ft (369 m)

Population (2020)
  - Total: 705
  - Density: 623/sq mi (241/km^{2})
- Time zone: UTC-6 (Central (CST))
  - Summer (DST): UTC-5 (CDT)
- Area codes: 715 & 534
- FIPS code: 55-01350
- GNIS feature ID: 1582680
- Website: https://villageofalmenawi.com

Almena is a village in Barron County in the U.S. state of Wisconsin. The population was 705 at the 2020 census.

== History ==
A post office called Almena has been in operation since 1888. The village's name is an amalgamation of Albert and Wilhelmina, the names of a first settler and his wife. Almena was platted in 1891. The name Almena came about after the federal government rejected the name "Lightning City" for a post office, which was derived from the nearby Lightning Creek.

== Geography ==
Almena is located on the boundary between the Towns of Almena and Clinton, approximately 82 miles (132 km) northeast of Minneapolis.

According to the United States Census Bureau, the village has a total area of 1.14 square miles (2.95 km^{2}), all land.

Almena is located along U.S. Highway 8 and County Road P.

== Demographics ==
Historical population
Census	Pop.	Note	%±
1950	406		—
1960	398		−2.0%
1970	423		6.3%
1980	526		24.3%
1990	625		18.8%
2000	720		15.2%
2010	677		−6.0%
2020	705		4.1%
U.S. Decennial Census

=== 2010 census ===
As of the census of 2010, there were 677 people, 297 households, and 178 families living in the village. The population density was 593.9 inhabitants per square mile (229.3/km^{2}). There were 337 housing units at an average density of 295.6 per square mile (114.1/km^{2}). The racial makeup of the village was 96.2% White, 0.1% African American, 0.9% Native American, 0.3% Asian, 0.3% from other races, and 2.2% from two or more races. Hispanic or Latino people of any race were 0.7% of the population.

There were 297 households, of which 30.3% had children under the age of 18 living with them, 42.8% were married couples living together, 9.1% had a female householder with no husband present, 8.1% had a male householder with no wife present, and 40.1% were non-families. 30.6% of all households were made up of individuals, and 15.5% had someone living alone who was 65 years of age or older. The average household size was 2.28 and the average family size was 2.79.

The median age in the village was 39.3 years. 23.5% of residents were under the age of 18; 8% were between the ages of 18 and 24; 25.9% were from 25 to 44; 26.4% were from 45 to 64; and 16.2% were 65 years of age or older. The gender makeup of the village was 50.2% male and 49.8% female.

=== 2000 census ===
As of the census of 2000, there were 720 people, 295 households, and 182 families living in the village. The population density was 720 people per square mile (278/km^{2}). There were 308 housing units at an average density of 308 per square mile (118.9/km^{2}). The racial makeup of the village was 97.08% White, 0.14% Black or African American, 1.25% Native American, 0.83% from other races, and 0.69% from two or more races. Hispanic or Latino people of any race were 1.53% of the population.

There were 295 households, out of which 33.9% had children under the age of 18 living with them, 41.7% were married couples living together, 13.2% had a female householder with no husband present, and 38.3% were non-families. 29.5% of all households were made up of individuals, and 13.9% had someone living alone who was 65 years of age or older. The average household size was 2.44 and the average family size was 2.99.

In the village, the population was spread out, with 29.9% under the age of 18, 8.6% from 18 to 24, 31.8% from 25 to 44, 15.8% from 45 to 64, and 13.9% who were 65 years of age or older. The median age was 32 years. For every 100 females, there were 100 males. For every 100 females age 18 and over, there were 93.5 males.

The median income for a household in the village was $27,917, and the median income for a family was $34,028. Males had a median income of $25,833 versus $20,278 for females. The per capita income for the village was $13,928. About 10.8% of families and 14.9% of the population were below the poverty line, including 18% of those under age 18 and 15.6% of those age 65 or over.
