= Livonian Brothers of the Sword =

Catholic military order (1204–1237)

- Latin: Fratres militiæ Christi Livoniae; German: Schwertbrüderorden
- : 1. Seal of the Swordbrothers; 2. Coat of Arms of the Swordbrothers
- Active: 1204–1237
- Country: Terra Mariana
- Allegiance: Catholic Church
- Garrison/HQ: Wenden (Cēsis), Fellin (Viljandi), Segewold (Sigulda). Ascheraden (Aizkraukle), Goldingen (Kuldīga), Marienburg (Alūksne), Reval (Tallinn), Weißenstein (Paide)
- Battle honours: Livonian Crusade

Commanders
- Notable commanders: Master Wenno; Master Volquin

The order of Livonian Brothers of the Sword or Sword Brethren (German: Schwertbrüderorden), formally known as the Militia of Christ of Livonia (Latin: Fratres militiæ Christi Livoniae), was a Catholic military order of German crusading knights established in 1202 in Livonia by Albert, the third bishop of Riga. Pope Innocent III sanctioned the establishment in 1204 for the second time.

The membership of the crusading order comprised warrior monks mostly from northern Germany, who fought Baltic and Finnic pagans in the area of modern-day Estonia, Latvia and Lithuania.

Following their defeat by the Samogitians and Semigallians in the Battle of Saule in 1236, the remnants of the order were disbanded by the Pope in 1237 when some of the surviving sword brethren were allowed to return to Germany and those who opted to stay in "Terra Mariana" (Livonia) were accepted into the local branch of the Teutonic Order.

== Organization ==
The Sword Brethren had a set of rules adapted from the Knights Templar, requiring them to be of noble birth and to take vows of obedience, poverty, and celibacy. The order also included soldiers, artisans, and clerics as members. The Knights made up a general assembly, which selected a grand master and other officials.

The grandmaster served for life in the order. He chose a council and a military chief for each district castle, where the order's knights were living. Wenno von Rohrbach was the first master of the order (1204–1209), followed by Volkwin Schenk von Winterstein, who died in the Battle of Saule in 1236.

In the beginning, the main duty of the Sword Brothers was to protect priests and missionaries. The characteristics of the territory brought a moral challenge for the crusaders because the land of the Livs and Letts had not previously been Christian. Therefore, they did not have any justification to attack them. The division of conquered territory also was a problem faced by the order. Swordbrothers were to garrison the built castles to maintain control along the Daugava. However, garrison duties did not imply ownership. Albert of Riga established that one-third of any new territory could be retained by the order. Meanwhile, the rest of the territory was handed over to the bishop.

== History ==
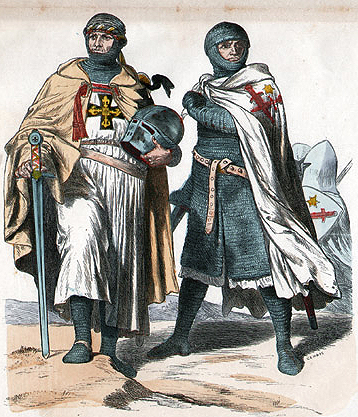
A Teutonic Knight on the left and a Swordbrother on the right.

=== Foundation ===
Albert, Bishop of Riga (also called Prince-Bishop of Livonia) (or possibly Theoderich von Treyden) realised that a standing army in Livonia would be more useful than crusaders staying a short time. As rewards for secular knights in the Baltic area were not enough to ensure their long-term stance, Albert founded the Brotherhood in 1202 to aid the Bishopric of Livonia in the conversion of the pagan Livonians, Latgalians and Selonians living across the ancient trade routes from the Gulf of Riga eastwards.

The Brotherhood had its headquarters at Fellin (Viljandi) in present-day Estonia, where the walls of the Master's castle still stand. Other strongholds included Wenden (Cēsis), Segewold (Sigulda) and Ascheraden (Aizkraukle). The commanders of Fellin, Goldingen (Kuldīga), Marienburg (Alūksne), Reval (Tallinn), and the bailiff of Weißenstein (Paide) belonged to the five-member entourage of the Order's Master.

=== Battles ===
In 1205, the first battle of the Livonian brothers occurred. The Semigallian duke Viesthard visited Riga to request the help of the Swordbrothers after a local Semigallian tribe was devastated by the Lithuanians. The brotherhood was reluctant to go to war due to the absence of bishop Albert. However, Viesthard successfully persuaded the Swordbrothers. They prepared an ambush against the Lithuanians that were returning with the booty, where the Lithuanian leader was beheaded.

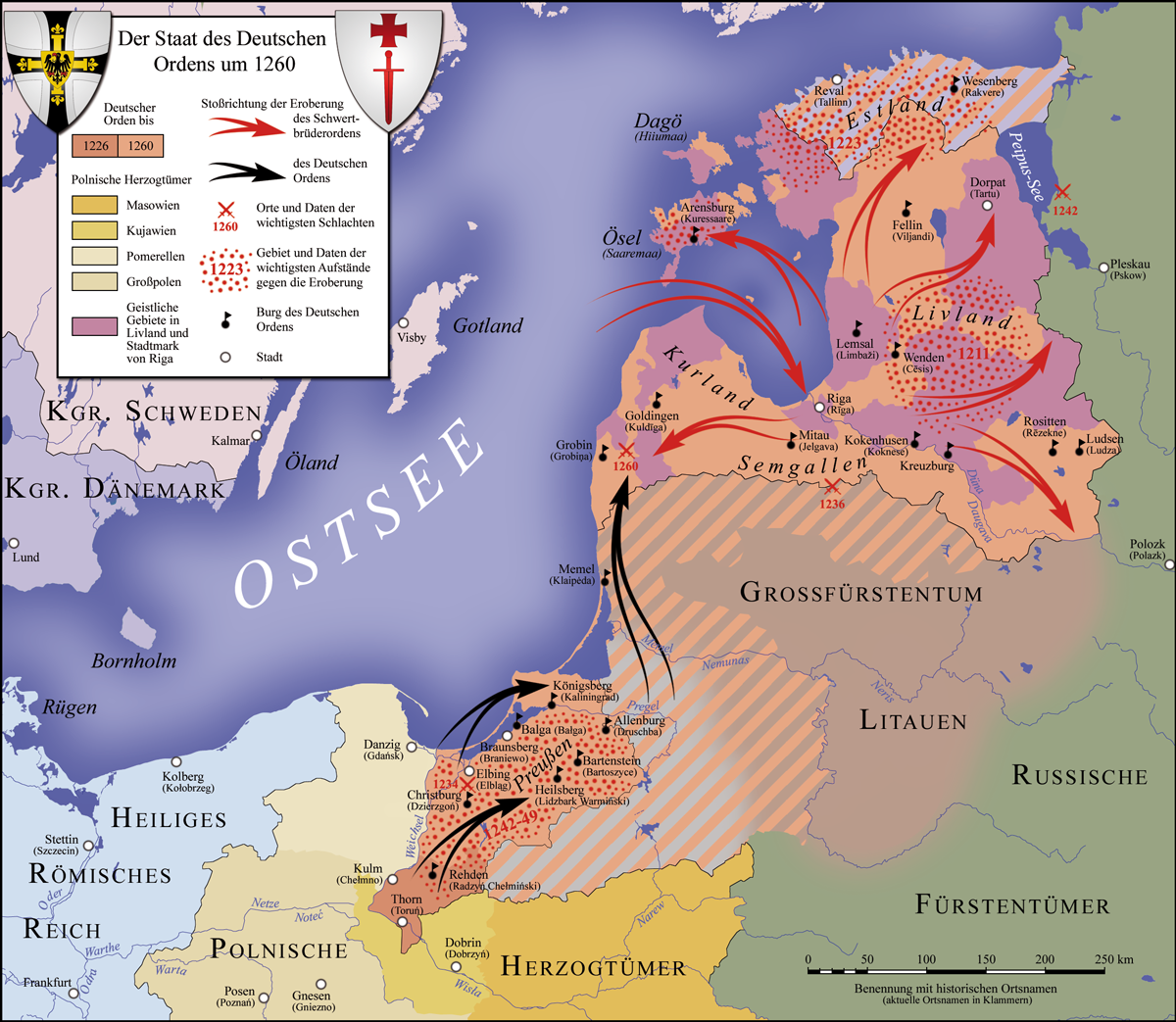
The lands of the Brothers of the Sword in Livonia conquered (red arrows) by 1237 and the lands of the Teutonic Order conquered in Prussia (black arrows)

In 1206, the Duke Vladimir of Polozk demanded tribute from the inhabitants of the Daugava when the terms of service of the crusaders expired. The Swordbrothers, with the help of the remaining crusaders, beat the Russian troops that arrived suddenly to Daugava.

In 1207, the Swordbrothers faced an attack from Lithuania launched during the winter. The Swordbrothers and allies stayed at the castle of Lennewarden on the north side of the Daugava. The Lithuanian army challenged the order to battle and was defeated by the Order. This victory served to show the value of the castle line along the river. The chain of castles allowed successful communication. Meanwhile, the local militia could assemble at the nearest fort to the raiders' return route and attack them.

The Swordbrothers had superiority in heavy cavalry. For that reason, natives tried to avoid pitched battles during the Livonian crusade. Most of the confrontations consisted of raids. The Order built a fortified line along the Daugava that created a peaceful time in the region. Livonian people began to consider the Swordbrothers as efficient protectors. Despite that, some native leaders felt that the Order represented a challenge to their authority, as the case of King Vetseke, the original owner of the fortress of Koknese. King Vetseke massacred German workers who were rebuilding the fortress. He was punished after that.

In 1211, several threats around Livonian prompted Albert of Riga to reinforce the defences. For safeguarding the northern flank, Albert organised an invasion of southern Estonia. The Swordbrothers were the core of the crusader army, allied with Russians, loyal Livs and Letts, and led by Engelbert von Thisenhusen, brother-in-law of Albert of Riga. After a siege, they took Fellin and negotiated a settlement with the condition that pagans accept baptism. The following year the order destroyed the Saccalian resistance in a battle where 2,000 Saccalians fell.

Between 1211 and 1212, the Swordbrothers realised that winter was the best season for warfare due to frozen swamps, weak undergrowth, and difficulty of their enemies to cover their tracks. Also, the knights could use frozen rivers as high-speed paths. The Order used these advantages in their campaigns until 1218, when they conquered southern Estonia, meanwhile they beat off counter-attacks from Russians and Lithuanians.

In 1230, Kurland was conquered and converted by the order.

=== Indiscipline ===
From its foundation, the indisciplined Order tended to ignore its supposed vassalage to the bishops. The desires of the Swordbrothers to expand to the north of the Daugava River, along the Livonian Aa stream, brought the Order into a confrontation with Bishop Albert. Albert wanted to extend to the south of the river and did not have an interest in Estonia, previously promised to King Valdemar II of Denmark.

Master Wenno advanced to the north without the permission of Bishop Albert. First, the Order took and occupied the fortress of Treiden. In 1208, they founded the castle of Segewold in the Aa valley, and the castle of Wenden further upstream. The last one grew as a fortress and Master Wenno located the Headquarters of the Order there. Wickbert, a man loyal to Albert of Riga, was placed to manage the Wenden castle. Master Wenno removed him, but Wickbert fled to the protection of Albert of Riga and killed Wenno with an axe.

In 1219, King Valdemar II of Denmark conquered northern Estonia with the help of Bishop Albert. In 1222, Estonia was partitioned between Valdemar II and Albert of Riga in an agreement unsatisfactory to the Swordbrothers. After that, they exploited the peasants until a revolt arose. The Pope rebuked the Order for the way they managed the conflict. Then, they tried to seize Danish land in Estonia until a papal legate made them give it back. When the papal legate left, the Swordbrothers took the Danish land again. They also invaded the territory of Bishop Albert and levied tolls on traffic on the Daugava.

After the death of Albert of Riga in 1229, ecclesiastical authorities considered that the Order was no longer useful. The papal legate Bernard of Aulne decided that they should be suppressed, and he tried to recapture the Danish Castle at Reval. However, the Order defeated him and took him as a prisoner.

Pope Gregory IX asked the Brothers to defend Finland from the Novgorodian attacks in his letter of November 24, 1232. However, no known information regarding the knights' possible activities in Finland has survived. (Sweden eventually conquered Finland following the Second Swedish Crusade in 1249.)

=== Incorporation into the Teutonic Knights ===
The Order was decimated in the Battle of Saule in 1236 against Samogitians and Semigallians. This disaster led the surviving Brothers to become incorporated into the Order of Teutonic Knights in the following year, and from that point on they became known as the Livonian Order. They continued to function in all respects (rule, clothing and policy) as an autonomous branch of the Teutonic Order, headed by their own Master (himself de jure subject to the Teutonic Order's Grand Master).

== Masters ==
- Wenno (von Rohrbach) 1204–1209
- Volkwin (Schenk von Winterstein) 1209–1236

== Gallery ==
The Livonian Confederation in 1260.

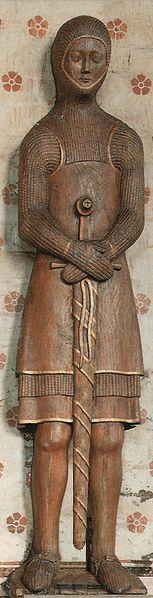
The Mecklenburgian swordbrother Helmold III. von Plesse.

== See also ==
- Teutonic Order
- Battle of Saule
- Livonian Crusade
- Northern Crusades
- Order of Dobrin
