= Vecsaule =

Village in Latvia

- Village
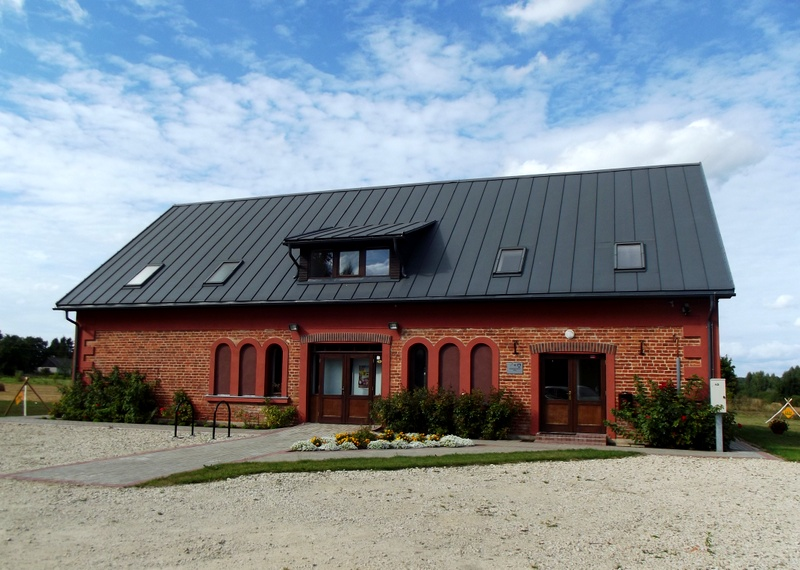
- Vecsaule Meeting House

- Vecsaule location in Latvia
- Coordinates: 56°25′54″N 24°20′0″E
- Country: Latvia
- Municipality: Bauska
- Parish: Vecsaule
- Elevation: 98 ft (30 m)

Population (2015)
  - Total: 375

Vecsaule (German: Alt-Rahden) is a village in Vecsaule Parish, Bauska Municipality in the Semigallia region of Latvia, located in the western part of the parish, on the bank of the Vecsaules stream on the road P87, 11 km from Bauska and 76 km from Riga. Village has Parish Administration, Vecsaule Elementary School, Library, Doctor Family Practice, post office and shops.

As of 2021, the village had a population of 338 people. the male population, was at 165 while the female was at 173.

== History ==
The village formed around the center of Vecsaule Manor (German: Alt-Rahden), having grown in the postwar years as the central village of the village councils and kolkhoz "Vecsaule". About 1 km south of the motorway V1020 is the Vecsaule Lutheran Church. Vecsaule Church Pub and Parish is a cultural heritage site of local importance.

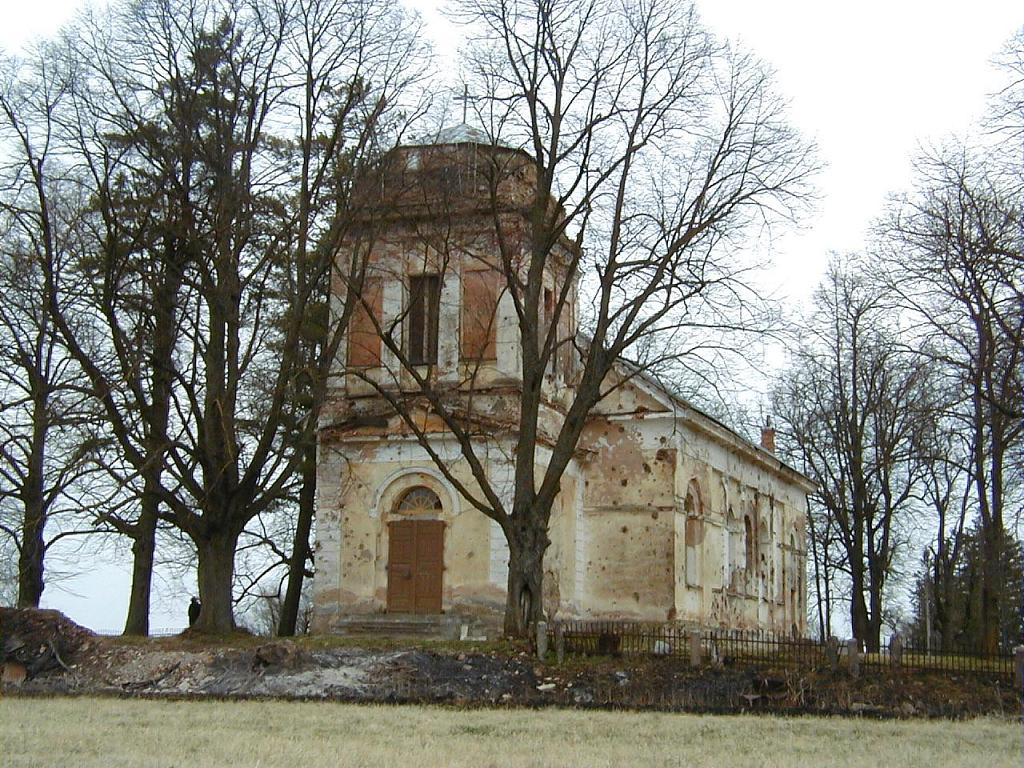
Vecsaule Lutheran Church

== See also ==
- Battle of Saule
