= Andreas von Velven =

Master of the Livonian Order (1241–1242; 1250–1253)

Landmeister Andreas von Velven
- Master of the Livonian Order
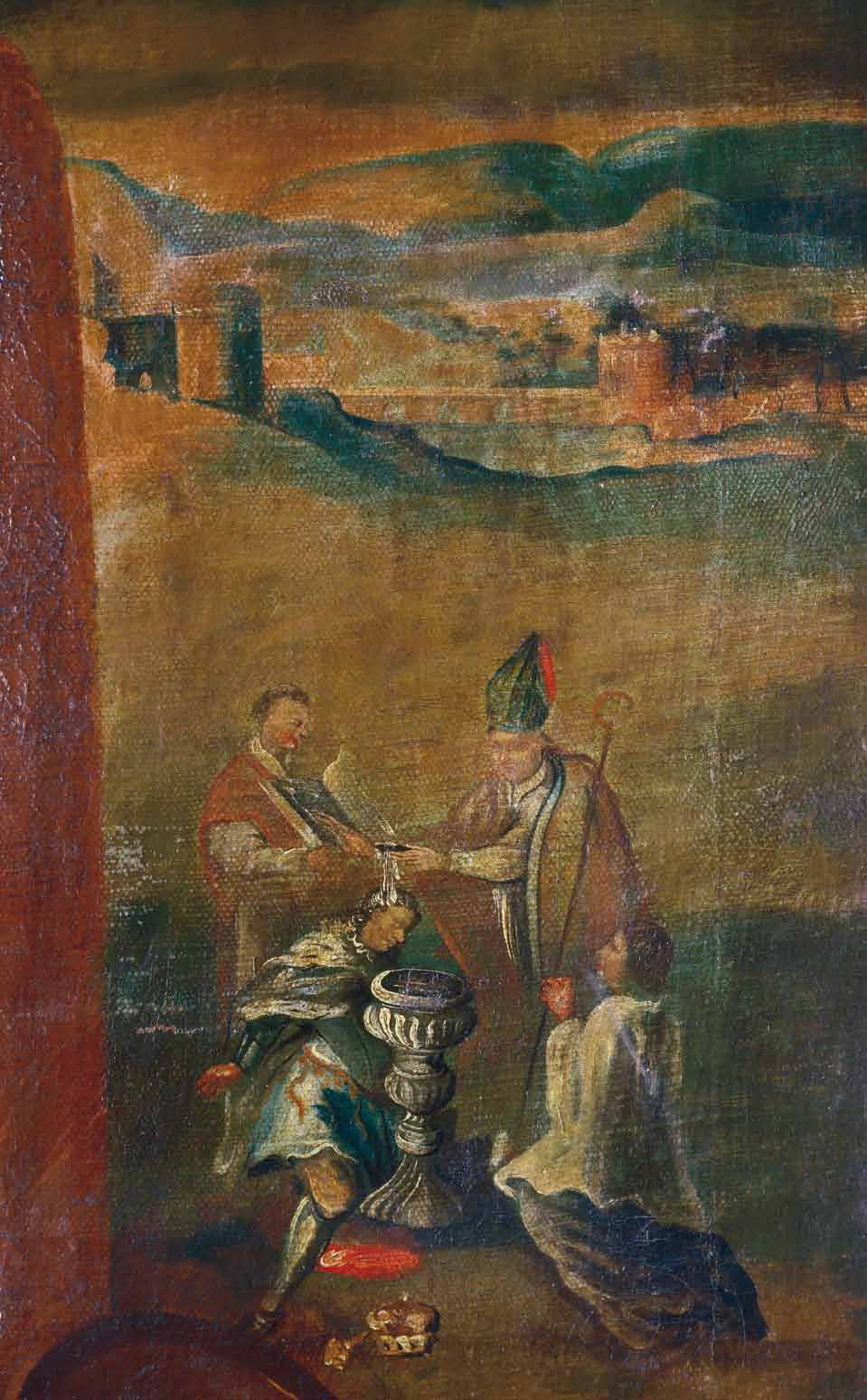
- The baptism of Mindaugas; On the left is Andreas von Felben, dressed as a Catholic monk.
- Elected: 1241; 1248
- In office: 1241–1242; 1248–1253
- Predecessor: Dietrich von Grüningen (1241); Heinrich von Heimburg (1248)
- Successor: Dietrich von Grüningen (1242); Anno von Sangershausen (1253)

Personal details
- Born: 1201 Prince-Archbishopric of Salzburg
- Died: 1261 (aged 59–60) Kingdom of Germany
- Denomination: Roman Catholic

Andreas von Velven, (Note: Alternatively rendered as Andreas von Felben) or Andreas von Stirland (1201–1263), was the Master of the Livonian Order from 1241 to 1242 and again from 1248 to 1253. His first tenure was dominated by the campaign against the Russian principalities in the east, and his second by the Order's relationship with the Grand Duchy of Lithuania. Allegations of catering to Lithuanian interests by dissidents in the order prompted him to resign in 1253.

== Biography ==
Andreas von Velven was born in the Prince-Archbishopric of Salzburg in around 1201 and heralded from a ministerialis family. He took over from Dietrich von Grüningen as Master of the Livonian Order in 1241. His first tenure saw him oversee the Novgorodian Crusade, in which the Teutonic Knights, which had incorporated the Livonian Brethren as an autonomous branch in 1237, fought against the Russian principalities. He provided martial support but did not actively campaign, being absent at the famous 1242 Battle of the Ice. In the affairs of Lithuania, he opposed Mindaugas, the grand duke and later king of Lithuania.

In 1242, he resigned and was succeeded by his predecessor. He then came to power again in 1248, succeeding Heinrich von Heimburg. In 1250, he set out to invade Lithuania and weaken Mindaugas. By the end of 1252, they had launched major raids into Nalšia and Lithuania proper. Mindaugas was eager to eliminate his main political rivals, namely Vykintas and his nephews Tautvilas and Gedvydas, and facing attacks from the order, he subsequentially acquiesced to the Livonian Order, bribing Andreas via sending him "many gifts" and promising to be baptized into Catholicism. This occurred in 1252, leading to the formation of the brief Kingdom of Lithuania. Mindaugas was crowned by Andreas in the summer of 1253.

Despite this, Andreas still had aspirations of ultimately subjugating Lithuania, forming a land-link between the lands of the Livonian Order, and the Teutonic Order's holdings in Prussia. There was as such discontent between him and members of the Livonian Order over this provisional alliance with Mindaugas. Nevertheless, Andreas agreed to back Mindaugas in exchange for parts of Samogitia. Andreas' cooperation with the Lithuanians engendered widespread opposition within the order, especially amongst a radical wing that was very keen on an invasion and conquest of Lithuania. Accusations of putting the interests of the Lithuanians before the order culminated in Andreas resigning as Master in 1253, and in autumn of that year, he returned to Germany. Although removed of his duties, his diplomatic connections to Lithuania remained important until the Battle of Durbe in 1260. He was replaced by the Teutonic Grandmarshall Eberhard von Sayn, who managed the Order on an interim basis until Anno von Sangershausen was elected in 1254.
