= Adolfas Tautavičius =

Lithuanian archaeologist

Adolfas Tautavičius (9 September 1925, Judrėnai, Lithuania – 10 August 2006, Vilnius) was a Lithuanian archaeologist and habilitated doctor.

In 1950 Adolfas Tautavičius graduated from Vilnius University and after four years (in 1954) he defended his thesis, Rytų Lietuva I m.e. tūkstantmetyje (East Lithuania in the 1st Millennium AD). In 1997, he became habilitated doctor with the work Vidurinysis geležies amžius Lietuvoje (The Middle Iron Age in Lithuania). From 1962 to 1987, he was the head of the archaeology department of the Lithuanian Institute of History. Among other excavations Tautavičius researched the Vilnius Castle Complex, Klaipėda Castle, and Trakai Peninsula Castle sites. Tautavičius wrote more than 600 academic publications and articles.
