= Konrad von Mandern =

Konrad von Mandern (1230 - 1295) was the master of the Livonian branch of the Teutonic Order from 1263 to 1266

Not much is known about the childhood or early life of Mandern, except that he was probably born somewhere in the modern-day area of Latvia and became associated with the Teutonic Order sometime around 1252, eventually climbing the ranks to become the master of the Livonian Teutonic Order

Mandern rose to power at a time when the chaos stemming from the Great Curonian Uprising which had already been going on for about three years at that point and so Mandern mostly concerned the early tenure of his position to assist in the stabilization of Lithuania.

In 1264, Mandern and his army marched into and invaded Zemgale where, after a long skirmish, he decides to carry on the battle despite being at a disadvantage and is eventually defeated, losing 20 knights of the Order and 600 other soldiers in the battle.

After this defeat, in 1265, for the further conquest of Zemgale, a fortification called Mythava was built by the Order along the area. The land upon which the fortifications were being built belonged to the Archbishopric of Riga and thus was granted land rights for such structure being formed by William of Modena to do so prior to his death in 1251 and was also given the final permission to construct Mythava and various other forts in 1266.

After many more battles and conflicts, (including multiple crusades) Mandern resigned from his position mostly due to a catastrophic series of failures and defeats and left to live to Germany where he spent the remainder of his life there although he continued to be in minor roles for the Teutonic Order. In 1268, he was reported as being the deputy master of the local Teutonic Order branch in Lübeck, Germany and later came to settle in Marburg, which would the place he would die in from natural causes in 1295.
