= Livonian Order =

Branch of the Teutonic Order, 1237–1561

- Seal of the Livonian Order's master VTOIINLIVONIA MENDATORIS•DOM and the coat of arms of the Teutonic Knights
- Active: 1237–1561
- Country: State of the Teutonic Order (1237–1561)
- Branch: Teutonic Order
- Garrison/HQ: Wenden (Cēsis), Fellin (Viljandi)

The Livonian Order was an autonomous branch of the Teutonic Order, formed in 1237. From 1435 to 1561, it was a member of the "Livonian Confederation".

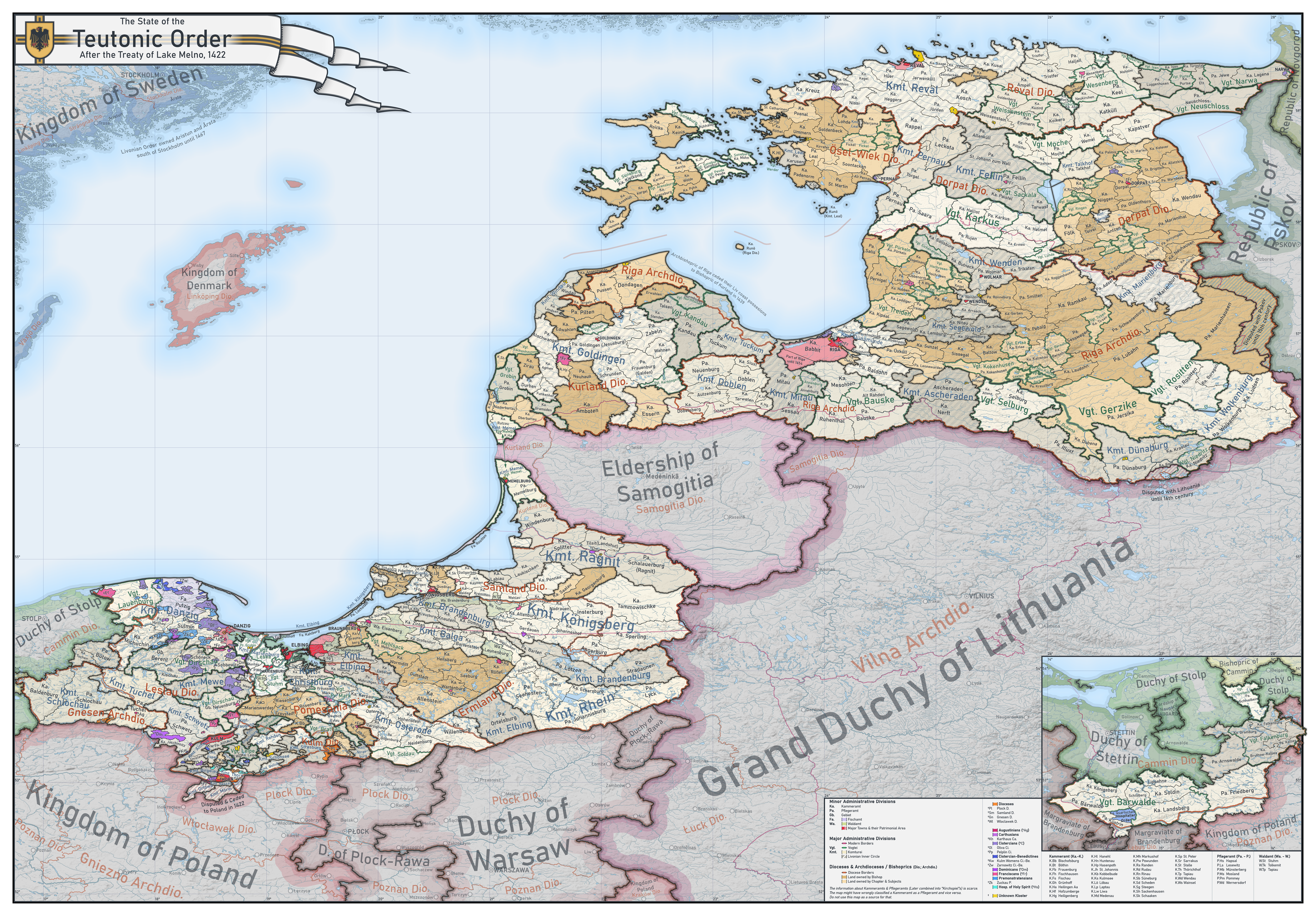
Medieval Livonia in 1422

== History ==
The Livonian branch of the Teutonic Order was formed from the remnants of the crusading order of the Livonian Brothers of the Sword (a.k.a. the Swordbrothers) after their defeat by Samogitians in 1236 at the Battle of Saule. In 1237, most of the former Swordbrothers became members of the Teutonic Order, thus forming its new regional branch in Livonia. In the summer of that year, the Master of Prussia Hermann Balk rode into Riga to install his men as castle commanders and administrators of Livonia.

In 1238, the Teutonic Knights of Livonia signed the Treaty of Stensby with the Kingdom of Denmark. Under this agreement, Denmark would support the expansion ambitions of the order in exchange for northern maritime Estonia.

In 1242, the Livonian Order tried to take the city of Novgorod. However, they were defeated by Alexander Nevsky in the Battle on the Ice.

Fortresses as Paide in land ceded by Denmark in the Treaty of Stensby allowed the order to contain the threat of Russian troops. For that reason, the order focused on its southern borders and Semigallia. Semigallia was a strategic territory for the Livonian Order. Lithuanians passed through Semigallia to raid settlements in Livonia, and they took advantage of the winter ice pack in the Gulf of Riga to reach Oesel Island. Also, this territory kept the Livonian Branch of the Teutonic Order separated from the Prussian Branch.

Between 1237 and 1290, the Livonian Order conquered all of Courland, Livonia and Semigallia. In 1298, Lithuanians took Karkus Castle north of Riga, and defeated the order in the Battle of Turaida, killing Livonian Land Master Bruno and 22 knights. In 1346, the order bought the Duchy of Estonia from King Valdemar IV of Denmark. Life within the order's territory is described in the Chronicle of Balthasar Russow (Chronica der Provinz Lyfflandt).

The Teutonic Order fell into decline following its defeat in the Battle of Grunwald in 1410 and the secularization of its Prussian territories by Albert of Brandenburg in 1525, while the Livonian branch of the Teutonic Order managed to maintain an independent existence.

=== Livonian "confederation" agreement (1435) ===
The Teutonic Order's defeat in the Battle of Święta (Wiłkomierz) on September 1, 1435, which claimed the lives of the master and several high-ranking knights, brought the order closer to its neighbors in Medieval Livonia. "A friendly (confederation) agreement" (eiine fruntliche eyntracht) was signed in Walk on 4 December 1435, by the Archbishop of Riga, the bishops of Courland, Dorpat, Ösel-Wiek and Reval; the representatives of the Teutonic Order and vassals, and the deputies of Riga, Reval and Dorpat city municipal councils.

During the Livonian War, however, the order suffered a decisive defeat by troops of Muscovite Russia in the Battle of Ergeme in 1560. The Livonian Order then sought protection from Sigismund II Augustus, King of Poland and Grand Duke of Lithuania, who had intervened in a war between Bishop William of Riga and the Brothers in 1557.

After coming to an agreement with Sigismund II, Augustus and his representatives (especially Mikołaj "the Black" Radziwiłł), the last Livonian Master, Gotthard Kettler, secularized the order and converted to Lutheranism. In the southern part of the Brothers' lands he created the Duchy of Courland and Semigallia for his family. Most of the remaining lands were seized by the Grand Duchy of Lithuania. Northern Estonia was taken back by Denmark and Sweden.

From the 14th to the 16th centuries, Middle Low German as spoken in the towns of the Hanseatic League was the established language, but was subsequently succeeded by High German as official language in the course of the 16th and 17th centuries.

== Masters of the Livonian Order ==
The Livonian Master, like the grandmaster of the Teutonic Order, was elected by his fellow knights for a life term. The grandmaster exercised supervisory powers and his advice was considered equal to a command. The grandmaster of Teutonic knights did not limit local autonomy, he rarely visited Livonia or sent ambassadors for oversight.

● Hermann Balk 1237–1238
● Dietrich von Grüningen 1238–1241
● Andreas von Velven 1241–1242
● Dietrich von Grüningen 1242–1246
● Heinrich von Heimburg 1246–1248
● Andreas von Velven 1248–1253
● Anno von Sangershausen 1254–1256
● Burkhard von Hornhausen 1256–1260
● Werner von Breithausen 1261–1263
● Konrad von Mandern 1263–1266
● Otto von Lutterberg 1266–1270
● Walther von Nortecken 1270–1273
● Ernst von Rassburg 1273–1279
● Konrad von Feuchtwangen 1279–1281
● Wilken von Endorp 1281–1287
● Konrad von Herzogenstein 1288–1290
● Halt von Hohembach –1293
● Heinrich von Dinkelaghe 1295–1296
● Bruno 1296–1298
● Gottfried von Rogga 1298–1307
● Gerhard van Joeck 1309–1322
● Johannes Ungenade 1322–1324
● Reimar Hane 1324–1328
● Everhard von Monheim 1328–1340
● Burchard von Dreileben 1340–1345
● Goswin von Hercke 1345–1359
● Arnold von Vietinghof 1359–1364
● Wilhelm von Vrymersheim 1364–1385
● Robin von Eltz 1385–1389
● Wennemar Hasenkamp von Brüggeneye 1389–1401
● Konrad von Vietinghof 1401–1413
● Diderick Tork 1413–1415
● Siegfried Lander von Spanheim 1415–1424
● Zisse von Rutenberg 1424–1433
● Franco Kerskorff 1433–1435
● Heinrich von Bockenvorde 1435–1437
● Heinrich Vinke von Overbergen 1438–1450
● Johann Osthoff von Mengede 1450–1469
● Johann Wolthuss von Herse 1470–1471
● Bernd von der Borch 1471–1483
● Johann Freytag von Loringhoven 1483–1494
● Wolter von Plettenberg 1494–1535
● Hermann Hasenkamp von Brüggeneye 1535–1549
● Johann von der Recke 1549–1551
● Heinrich von Galen 1551–1557
● Johann Wilhelm von Fürstenberg 1557–1559
● Godert (Gotthard) Kettler 1559–1561

== Commanderies of the Livonian Order ==
Across modern territory of Estonia and Latvia:

=== Estonia ===
- Komturei Reval
- Komturei Pernau
- Komturei Jerwen
- Komturei Fellin
- Komturei Talkhof

=== Latvia ===
- Komturei Marienburg
- Landmarschall Segewold
- Ordensmeister (Komturei) Dünamünde
- Komturei Ascheraden
- Komturei Dünaburg
- Komturei Bauske
- Komturei Mitau
- Komturei Doblen
- Komturei Goldingen
- Komturei Windau
