= Klaipėda Castle =

- Klaipėdos pilis (Lithuanian)
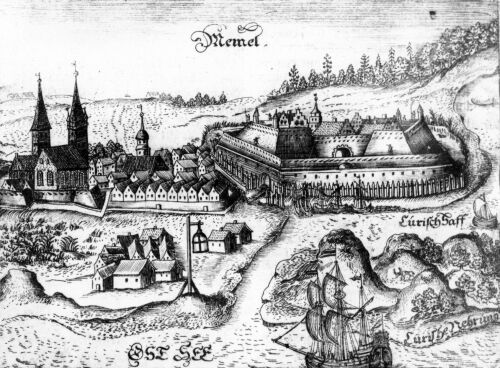
- Klaipėda Castle in the 17th century
- Interactive map of Klaipėda Castle
- 55°42′20″N 21°07′44″E
- Type: Castle
- Location: Klaipėda, Lithuania

History
- Built: 1252
- Built for: Teutonic Order

Site notes
- Architectural style: Brick Gothic

Plan of Klaipėda Castle (1742)

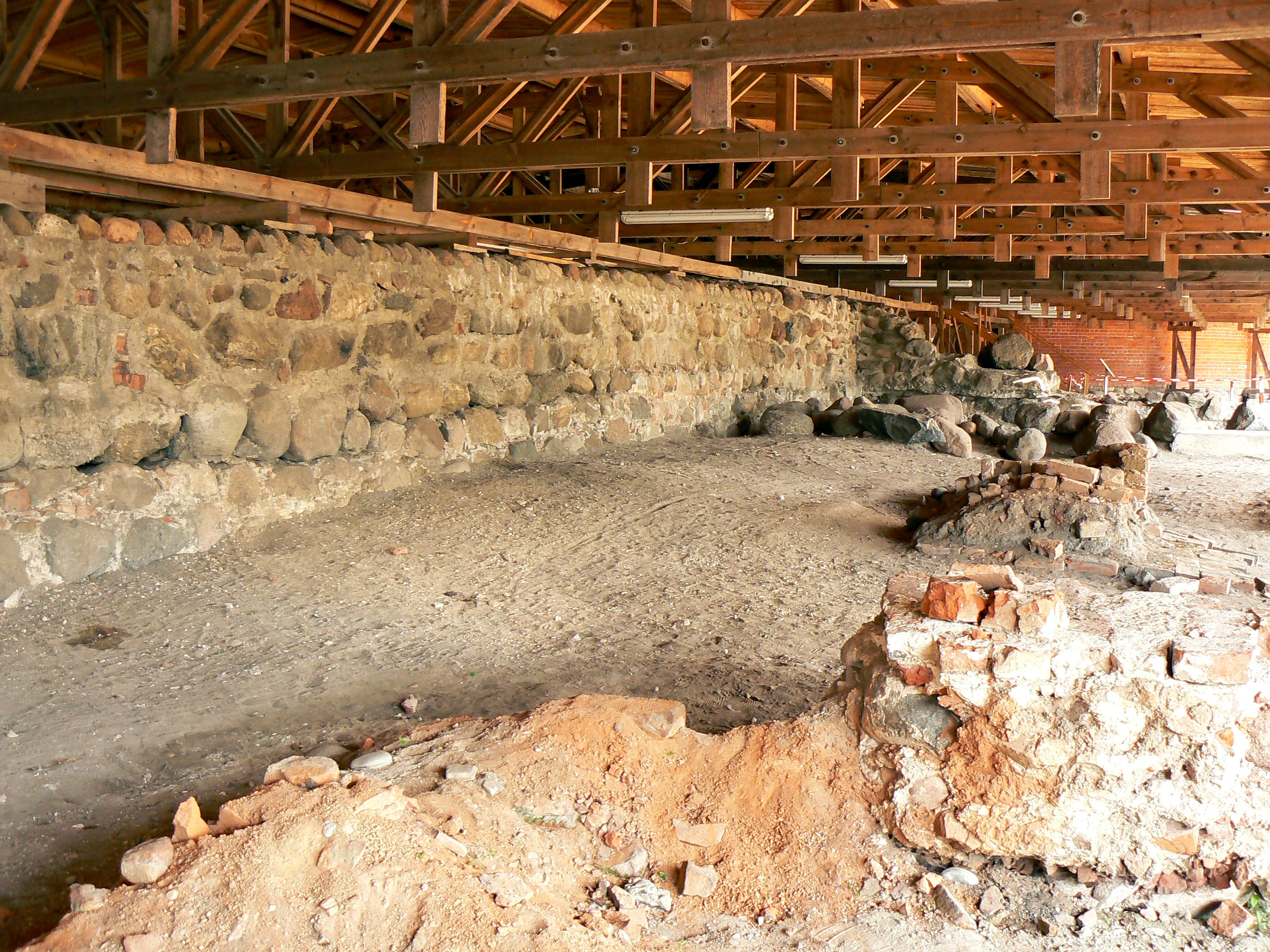
Ruins of Klaipėda Castle

Klaipėda Castle (Lithuanian: Klaipėdos pilis), also known as Memelburg or Memel Castle, is an archeological site and museum housed in a castle built by the Teutonic Knights in Klaipėda, Lithuania, near the Baltic Sea. The Teutons called the castle Memelburg or Memel, and Klaipėda was generally known as Memel until 1923, when Lithuanian military forces took over the city. The castle was first mentioned in written sources in 1252, and underwent numerous destructions and reconstructions in the centuries that followed. During the 19th century, having lost its strategic importance, the castle was demolished. Archeological work was performed at the site during the 20th century, and in 2002 a museum was established underneath one of its bastions. The museum has reopened following restoration, which was completed in 2021.

== History ==
The Christian Teutonic Order had been waging an ongoing war against the Prussians during the 13th century; in order to entrench their gains, the Teutons built a number of castles in the area. One such castle was planned for a location between the Nemunas and Dangė rivers. A written account of this plan is dated to 1252, when a Grand Master of the Teutons, represented by Eberhard von Sayn, made an agreement with the Curonian bishop to build this fortification. In the same year the Christians constructed the castle and named it Memelburg. The new castle was wooden, protected by a tower, and was in a marshy area. It is likely that this first castle was located on the left bank of the Danė river. It soon became a prime outpost in the war between the Christian Orders and the pagan Lithuanians allied with the Samogitians.

Probably because the low-lying area in which the first castle was built presented problems, a new stone castle was erected on the right bank of the Danė river in 1253. The new castle contained an enclosure; currently it is unknown whether it had any defensive tower. In 1379 the castle was destroyed in an attack by the Samogitians and Lithuanians. This destruction was followed by reconstruction; in 1393 a major defensive tower was erected, which was, however, destroyed by the Lithuanians in the same year. Continued expansions and renovations of the castle were systematically pursued until the 15th century. In 1408 and 1409 Grand Master Ulrich von Jungingen arrived with additional military engineers, and the castle's upgrade was completed soon afterwards in 1409. After the Teutonic Order lost the key Battle of Grunwald in 1410, the castle's military importance was sustained, as Lithuanian rulers regarded these territories as part of their patrimony. In the mid-15th century the castle was again upgraded to withstand assaults using firearms.

As the technologies used in warfare continued to evolve, the castle was rebuilt several times. During the 16th century it was upgraded into a bastion, becoming one of the first such fortifications in the region. Between 1529 and 1559 the castle underwent an upgrade by French engineers. After its reconstruction the castle had five towers associated with the main building. The main tower probably had six floors and was about 15 meters in diameter. In 1629 the castle was devastated by Swedish attacks; it later suffered major fire damage. In 1757 the castle sustained severe damage during a war with Russia. The last known reconstruction of the castle was done in 1763.

During the late 18th century, the castle lost its military importance and fell into disrepair. It was partially dismantled and its parts and materials were sold by local authorities. Between 1872 and 1874 the last remaining buildings were demolished.

== Castle today ==
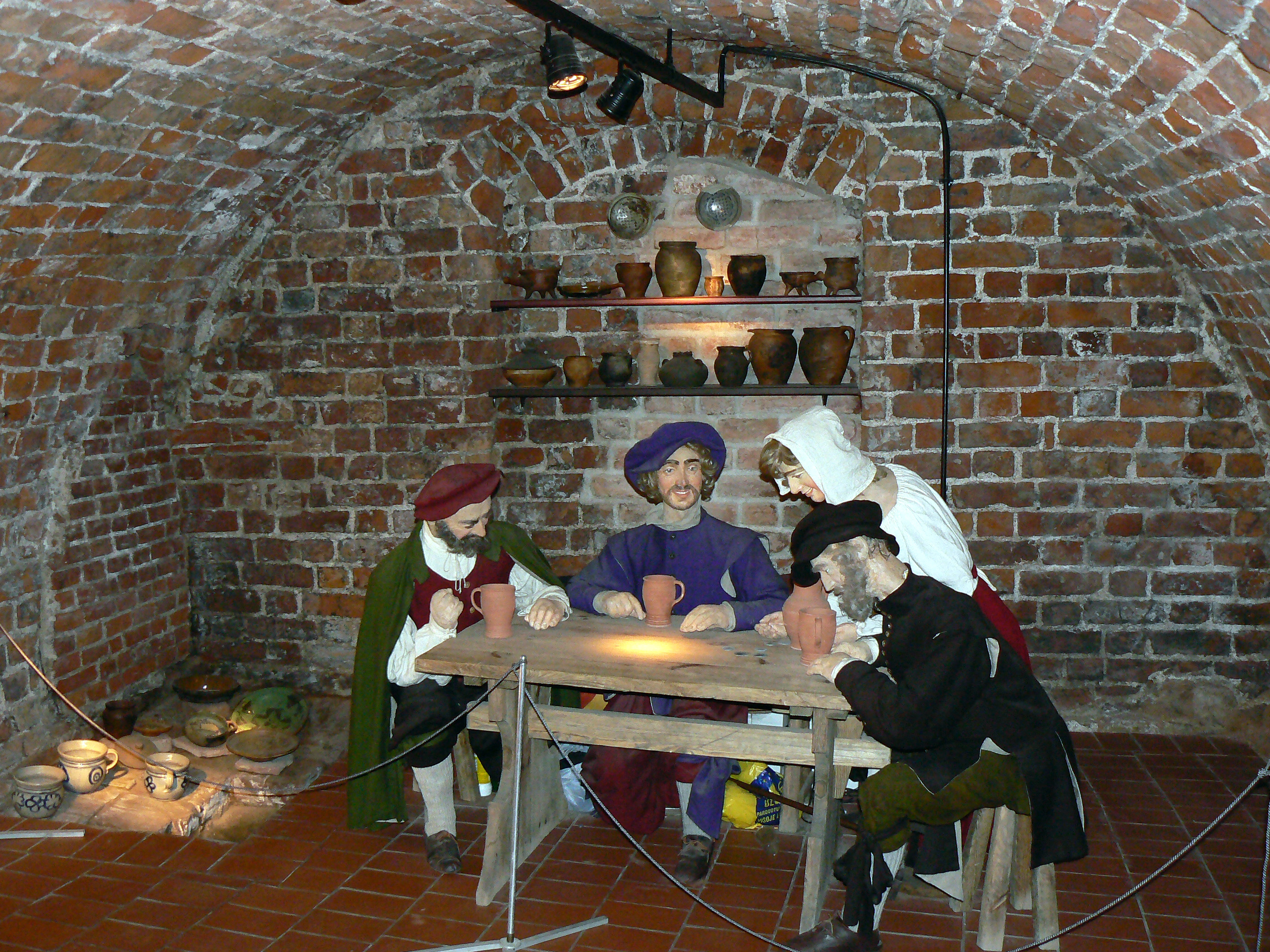
Museum in the remaining section of the castle

A major excavation of the castle's site was performed in 1968 under the supervision of archaeologist Adolfas Tautavičius. At that time a major cultural layer of the former Teuton castle was discovered. Excavations at the site have been ongoing since 1975; the work has been delayed by the urbanization of the area, which is near the Port of Klaipėda. Plans have been made to remove surrounding structures; this removal was scheduled for completion in 2009.

On August 1, 2002, in celebration of the City of Klaipėda's 750th anniversary, a museum was opened at the castle. The museum is located in the Prince Fredric chamber under the bastion, where artillery was stored in the 17th century. Visitors may familiarize themselves with the excavated findings, view the authentic remaining sections of the castle, and follow its historical development. The City of Klaipėda, in partnership with the European Network of National Heritage Organisations, envisions a re-integration of the castle and its surroundings with the Old Town and the Curonian Lagoon. The castle's site has since become one of Klaipėda's most popular tourist attractions. The annual Klaipėda Castle Jazz Festival is held on the grounds.

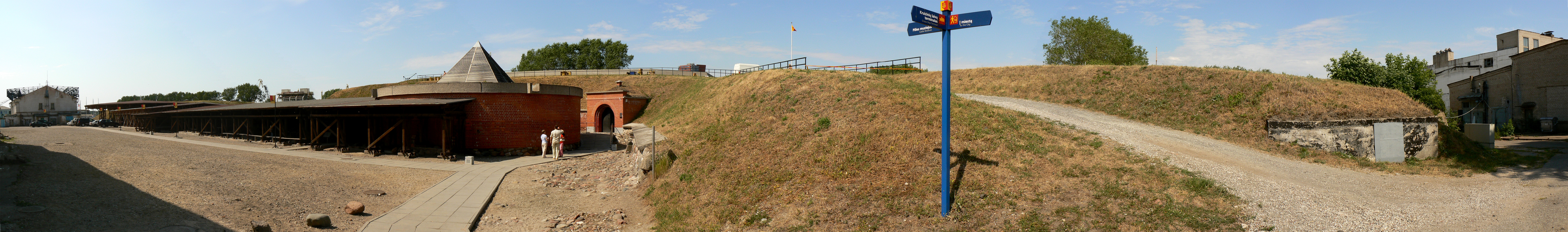
Klaipėda Castle site in 2006.

== See also ==
- List of castles in Lithuania
