= Alminas =

13th century Lithuanian duke

Alminas (Almenas, Algminas, Alemanas (German: Aleman) (fl. mid-13th century) was a Samogitian duke (kunigaikštis). The pre-Christian Lithuanian name Alminas is constructed of two components: '-al' + '-min-'.

In the Livonian Rhymed Chronicle he was called "brave warrior". When Mindaugas ceded Samogitia to the Livonian Order, Alminas organized a resistance and was elected to head the Confederation of Samogitian Lands (Žemaičių žemių konfederacija). Historian Inga Baranauskienė argued that Alminas was a leader in the Battle of Durbe.
