= Burkhard von Hornhausen =

Master of Livonian Order

- Seal of the Livonian Order with the inscription "(Sigillum) (Com)MENDATORIS DOM(us) (the)VTO(nic)I IN LIVONIA" - "Seal of the Commander of the Teutonic Order in Livonia".
- Died: July 13, 1260; Battle of Durbe
- Cause of death: killed in action

Burkhard von Hornhausen (* before 1252; † July 13 1260 in the Battle of Durbe) was from 1257 to 1260 Landmeister in Livonia of the Teutonic Order. He was the first commander and directed the construction of the Königsberg Castle.

Burkhard von Hornhausen appeared in Prussia around 1252. In 1254 he became Commander of the Samland and was the first Commander of the Königsberg Castle (1255–1256) and from January 18, 1255 to 1257 Vice-Landmeister of Prussia. In 1257 Burkhard became Landmeister Livonia. In 1255 he and his troops joined the Ottokar II of Bohemia and took part in the winter campaigns of 1254 and 1255.

During the campaign from 1256 to 1257 he had a number of castles built on the site of Prussian fortresses: Allenburg, Groß Wonsdorf and Georgenburg, and had Welau Castle rebuilt. As landmaster of the Teutonic Order in Livonia, he acquired extensive land. On July 13, 1260, during the Battle of Durbe between the knights of the order and local fighters, he fell together with about 150 knights. The Teutonic Order suffered a defeat.
