= Samogitians =

Lithuanian ethnic group

žemaitē
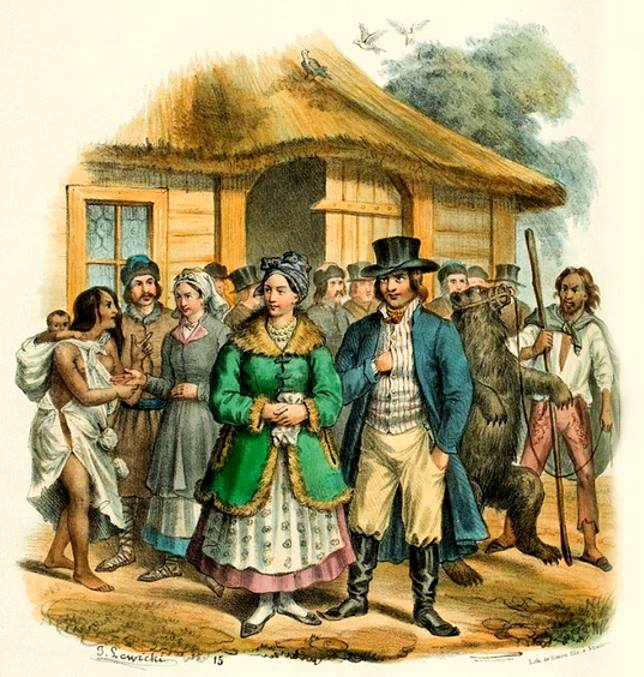
- Samogitians in the first half of the 19th century

Total population
- c. 500,000 in Lithuania (estimated)

Regions with significant populations
- Samogitia

Languages
- Samogitian, Standard Lithuanian language

Religion
- Catholicism

Related ethnic groups
- Aukštaitians, Curonians

Samogitians are the inhabitants of Samogitia, an ethnographic region of Lithuania. Many speak the Samogitian language, which in Lithuania is mostly considered a dialect of the Lithuanian language together with the Aukštaitian dialect. The Samogitian language differs the most from the standard Lithuanian language.

Whether Samogitians are considered to be a distinct ethnic group or merely a subset of Lithuanians varies. However, 2,169 people declared their ethnicity as Samogitian during the Lithuanian census of 2011, of whom 53.9% live in Telšiai County. The political recognition and cultural understanding of the Samogitian ethnicity has, however, changed drastically throughout the last few centuries as 448,022 people declared themselves Samogitians, not Lithuanians, in the 1897 Russian Empire census.

== History ==
On 13 July 1260, the Samogitians decisively defeated the joint forces of the Teutonic Knights from Prussia and Livonian Order from Livonia in the Battle of Durbe. Some 150 knights were killed, including Livonian Master Burchard von Hornhausen and Prussian Land Marshal Henrik Botel.

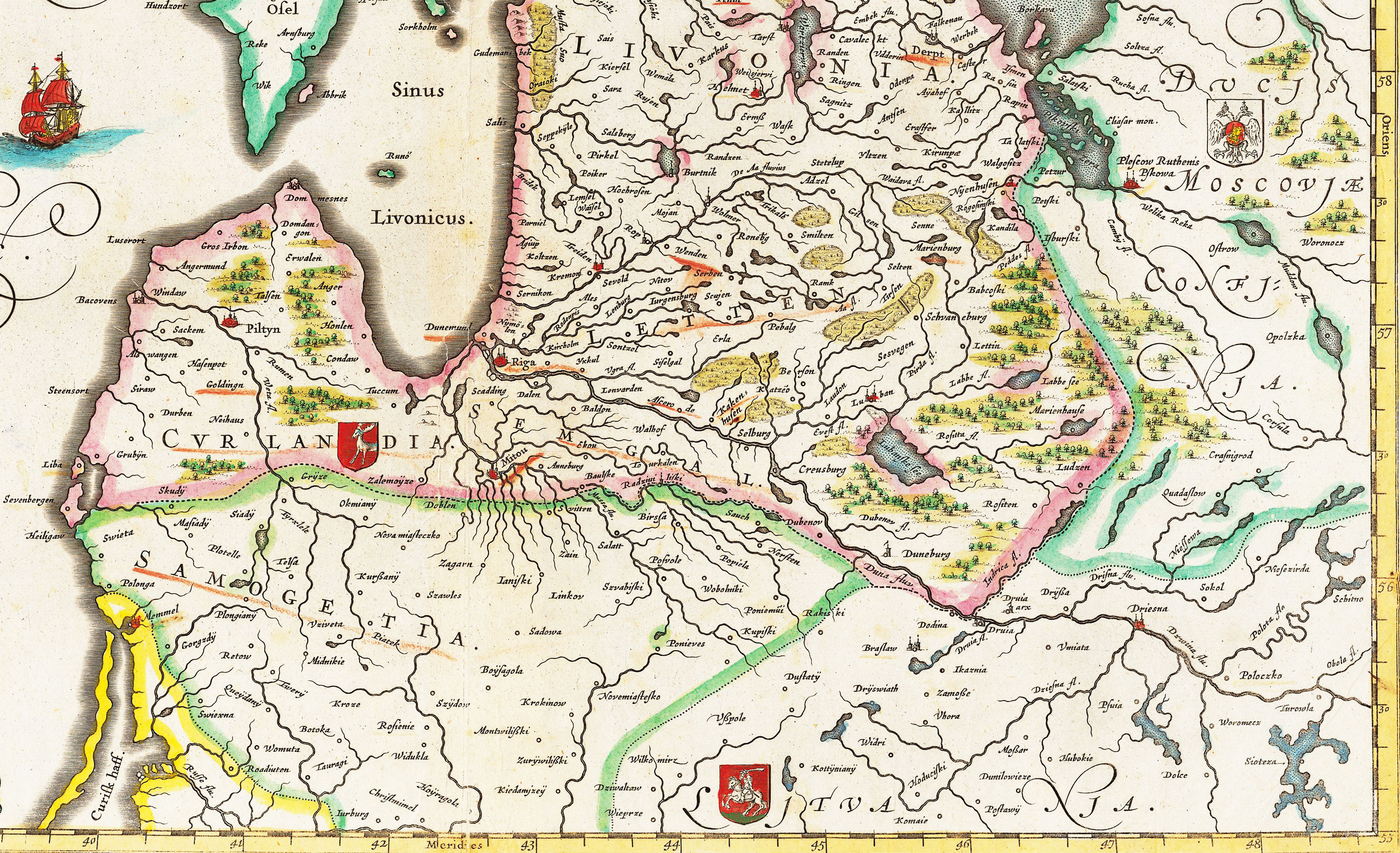
Samogitia in the 17th century

Samogitians lived in western Lithuania and were closely related to Semigallians and Curonians. In 1413, they became the last group of Europeans to convert to Christianity. Samogitians lived in the Duchy of Samogitia within the Grand Duchy of Lithuania. In 1857, there were 418,824 people of Samogitian roots and 444,921 persons declared the Samogitian language as their mother tongue in 1897 in Kovno Governorate. Currently Lithuania does not allow for declaration of Samogitian nationality in passports as it is not a recognized ethnicity. In list of ethnic groups of Russia there is one person who declared himself with "Zhemaijty".

== Exonyms ==
Samogitians call themselves žemaitē, although exonyms are used in different languages.

Language	Samogitia	Samogitians
Samogitian	Žemaitėjė	žemaitē
Lithuanian	Žemaitija	žemaičiai
Belarusian	Жамойць, Жмудзь	жамойты, жмудзіны
Yiddish	זאַמעט (Zámet)	זאַמעטער (Zámeter)
Estonian	Žemaitija	Žemaidid
Dutch	Samogitië	Samogitiërs
French	Samogitie	samogitiens
German	Schameiten	Schameiten
Italian	Samogizia	samogizi
Latvian	Žemaitija	žemaiši
Polish	Żmudź	Żmudzini
Portuguese	Samogícia	samogícios
Russian	Жемайтия	жемайты
Spanish	Samogitia	samogitios
Swedish	Samogitien	Samogitier
Ukrainian	Жмудь	жмудини
