= Tālava =

Latgalian country disestablished 1224

Coordinates: 57°30′N 25°27′E

Eldership of Tālava Tuolova (Latgalian) Tālava (Latvian)
- before 1180–1224
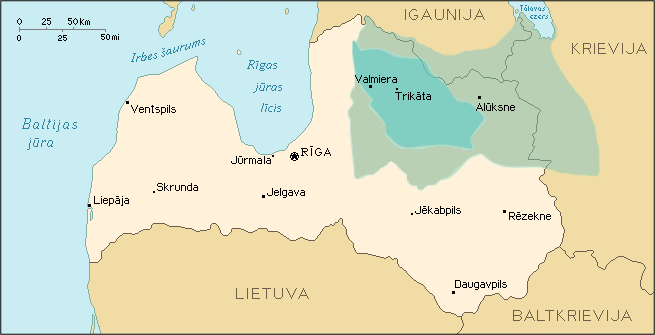
- Tālava and its border speculations in 12-13th centuries.
- Capital: Beverīna
- Common languages: Latgalian
- Religion: Latgalian paganism, Eastern Orthodoxy
- Government: Eldership
- Elder
- History
  - Established: before 1180
  - Disestablished: 1224
Succeeded by
Bishopric of Riga; Livonian Brothers of the Sword

Tālava (Latgalian: Tuolova; Latin: Tholowa) was a Latgalian country in the northern Vidzeme and northern Latgale region of modern-day Latvia. It was bordered by the Latgalian Principality of Jersika to the south, the Livonian counties of Metsepole and Idumeja to the west, the Estonian counties of Sakala and Ugandi to the north and the Russian Novgorod Republic to the east.

Tālava was first mentioned in the Livonian Chronicle of Henry in 1207 as the Christian County of Tholowa. Russian chronicles refer to the county of Atzele (Russian: Очела, romanized: Ochela), first mentioned in 1111, which was probably the eastern part of Tālava. The county existed from the 10th century until 1224 when it was divided between Bishopric of Riga and the Brothers of the Sword.

== History ==
After Mstislav Rostislavich "the Brave", the prince of Novgorod, rode against the Chud during the winter of 1179-1180, Tālava was forced to pay tribute to Novgorod. The leader of Tālava, Tālivaldis and his sons were baptized in the Eastern Orthodox faith.

In 1208, Tālivaldis, together with the Latgalian leaders Rūsiņš of Satekle and Varidots of Autine, established a military alliance with the Livonian Brothers of the Sword. The Sword Brothers promised their help against the Novgorodians. In the same year, the Tālavians invited their northern enemies, presumably Ugandians (or Ugaunians), for peace talks which however ended unsuccessfully. The Tālavians together with the Sword Brothers then fought a four years war with the Estonian tribes, concluded by a peace treaty in Turaida in 1212.

In 1214, two sons of Tālivaldis, Rameks and Varibuls signed a new treaty with Bishop Albert of Riga, giving the northern part of Talava to the Bishopric of Riga. They converted from Eastern Orthodoxy to Roman Catholicism and became vassals of the bishop. In 1215 the Tālavians together with the bishop's forces continued their war against the Estonians. In response, the Estonians raided Tālava and captured Tālivaldis in Trikāta, and later burnt him to death. After the death of Tālivaldis, the war continued. His sons took revenge and plundered the Estonian lands, burning alive all Ugandian men they could catch.

In the winter of 1216, Tālava was in turn invaded by Novgorodian troops from Pskov.

After the capture of Tartu and the Christianisation of the Ugandians in 1224, Tālava was divided between the Bishopric of Riga and the Brothers of the Sword, the bishop receiving two-thirds and the Sword Brothers one-third of Tālava. Tālava thus became part of Terra Mariana.

== Legacy ==
A Latvian choir under the name Tālava (Russian: Талава) was established by members of the Latvian diaspora in Moscow in 1993.
