= Battle of Lehola =

1215 military conflict in Estonia during Livonian Crusade

- Part of the Livonian Crusade
Date	1215
Location	Lõhavere, Estonia 58°32′58″N 25°28′58″E
Result	Livonian victory

Belligerents
Sword-Brothers, Livs and Letts	Estonians

Commanders and leaders
Philip of Ratzeburg, Volkwin, Sons of Tālivaldis of Tolowa	Lembitu of Sackalia

Strength
Around 6,000	More than 9,000

Casualties and losses
Unknown	Unknown

The Battle of Lehola was fought in 1215 between the Livonian Brothers of the Sword, a crusading military order, and the Estonians.

== History ==
In the spring of 1215, a Crusader force with their allies raided the Sakala County. The plundering, however, was done in the northern section of the county. Afterwards, the crusader army besieged the stronghold of Lõhavere (Leole) that belonged to the elder Lembitu. The Estonian forces inside the stronghold confronted the enemy and "gave them a big scare". The besiegers nevertheless managed to light the stronghold on the third day. The Estonians weren't able to put the fire out and were forced to come out and surrender. During the christening, however, the German army invaded the stronghold and "robbed everything that could be robbed". Lembitu along with other elders were taken with the Germans, but were released soon after receiving the elders' sons as hostages.
