= Rūsiņš =

- Duke of Satekle
- Reign: until 1212
- Born: 12th century
- Died: 1212

Rūsiņš of Satekle (Latin: Russinus de Sotekele) was a Latgalian duke in the early 13th century who is several times mentioned in ancient sources due to his activities in Livonian Crusade.

== Biography ==
Rūsiņš date of birth is unknown and it is presumed that his residence was Satekle castle (most likely Tanīsa hillfort in the modern village of Rauna) which was important centre in the Latgalian county of Tālava. According to the Livonian Chronicle of Henry, Rūsiņš had a permanent group of warriors with him (Latin: amici Russini) most likely similar to a druzhina.

Rūsiņš is first time mentioned by name in 1208 when he, together with dukes Varidots of Autīne and Tālivaldis of Beverīna, signed military alliance with the Livonian Brothers of the Sword. In the next few years, Rūsiņš was often involved in the military campaigns against Estonian tribes.

In the autumn of 1208, Rūsiņš, together with Varidots, raided into the Estonian land of Saccalia and heavily devastated it. In the winter of 1209, latgalians signed a one-year peace treaty with the Estonians. Soon as the treaty expired, Rūsiņš joined the knight Berthold of Wenden in his campaign against the Ugandians. After this campaign, the Livonians and some of the Latgalians signed a new peace treaty with the Estonians, but Rūsiņš was among those Latgalians who together with the Swordbrothers continued to wage warfare. It is known that Rūsiņš participated in a military campaign against the Estonians in early 1211, and also conducted a raid to on Soontagana together with the crusaders, Russians from Pskov, and Livonian dukes Dabrels, Ninns and Caupo of Turaida. Most likely he also took part in a joint Livonian, Latgalian and crusader campaign into Saccala and the subsequent siege of Viljandi castle.

In 1211, Ugandians raided into Latgalian lands and killed several of Rūsiņš relatives.

In the summer of 1212, Latgalians from Autīne land came into conflict with German crusaders. This conflict soon turned into armed uprising against the German knights known as the Autīne revolt. Rūsiņš joined the uprising and came to the Livonian Satesele castle (modern Satezele hillfort in Sigulda) which was main centre of uprising. The crusaders soon besieged the castle. According to the Livonian Chronicle of Henry, Rūsiņš was on the castle wall when he saw his friend and former ally knight Berthold among the crusaders as he took off his helmet to greet him and almost immediately was killed by a crossbow arrow.

It is still not known why Rūsiņš, who was a loyal ally of the crusaders, quite suddenly joined the anti-German uprising. He perhaps felt that the German crusaders were a threat to his authority and estates or that the crusaders were exploiting him and other Latgalians to consolidate their rule in Livonia. Due to his role in battles, Henry of Livonia called him the bravest of all Latgalians (Latin: Letthorum fortissimus)
