= Battle of St. Matthew's Day =

1217 battle of the Livonian Crusade

- Part of the Northern Crusades
Date	21 September 1217
Location	Near Viljandi, Estonia. 58°26′48″N 25°28′57″E
Result	Livonian victory County of Sakala surrenders

Belligerents
Estonians; Sakala; Läänemaa; Harjumaa; Järvamaa; Revala; Virumaa	Sword Brethren; Livonians; Latgalians

Commanders and leaders
Lembitu of Lehola †; Vootele †; Manivald †; Unnepeve	Volquin; Caupo of Turaida †; Bernard II of Lippe

Strength
6,000	3,000

Casualties and losses
~1,000 (Henry of Latvia)	~100 (According to the later chronicle of the Teutonic Order, possibly heavily understated)

The Battle of Matthew's Day (Estonian: Madisepäeva lahing) was fought near Viljandi (probably in Vanamõisa) on 21 September 1217 during the Livonian Crusade. The adversaries were the Sword Brethren (a German Crusading order) with their recently converted Livonian and Latgalian allies versus an army of 6,000 Estonian men from different counties, led by Lembitu, who had attempted to unify the Estonians. The Germans won, although the converted Livonian chieftain Caupo of Turaida died. Lembitu was also killed, and many other Estonians were forced to convert.

== Prelude ==
=== Military situation in 1217 ===
Following the end of the Turaida truce and the resumption of hostilities, by 1217 the Livonian Brothers of the Sword, based in Riga, along with Bishop Albert and their supporting Latgalian and Livonian allies, had forced the elders of Ugandi, Sakala, Järvamaa, and Soontagana to recognize their authority.

Disturbed by these conquests, the princes of the Novgorod Republic and the Principality of Pskov, who considered Ugandi part of their sphere of influence, launched a military campaign together with their Saaremaa, Harjumaa, and Sakala allies against the stronghold of Otepää and the forces of Riga and Ugandi who had fortified themselves there. After a prolonged siege, the stronghold surrendered, and according to the resulting peace agreement, the forces of the order and the bishop were to withdraw from Ugandi. Control was also lost over other territories in Estonia that had previously been conquered.

=== Planning of the campaign against Riga ===
In August, the Estonians sent many gifts to the Russians and requested them to join a new military campaign against the forces of Riga. Svjatoslav Mstislavich, who had meanwhile become the new prince of Novgorod, agreed to gather troops together with Prince Vladimir Mstislavich of Pskov and other princes, and to march to Estonia.

The campaign in Estonia was led by the elder of Sakala, Lembitu, who is referred to by Henry of Latvia with the title princeps ac senior, which in Henry's usage likely signifies a war leader. At Lembitu's invitation, a large force of 6,000 men gathered by the Navesti (or Paala) River, likely near a river crossing close to the present-day village of Navesti. This army was composed of warriors from Sakala, Läänemaa, Harjumaa, Järvamaa, Revala and Virumaa Of the larger counties, only the men of Ugandi and Saaremaa did not join.

Scholars have suggested several reasons for the absence of the Saaremaa islanders, who had previously led major military actions in Estonia. The suggestions include the belief that Novgorod forces would not arrive in time, fear of losing their leadership status to rivals from Sakala, or possibly a plan to sail to the Daugava River and join the others there (it is likely that the campaign was originally planned in that direction).

The people of Ugandi, on the other hand, may have come into conflict with the other Estonians due to having fought on the side of the Germans during the Battle of Otepää. The number of 6,000 warriors mentioned in the Livonian Chronicle of Henry is not considered unrealistic; it may well represent the maximum number of troops that could be gathered from those counties.

The Estonians rejoiced and sent word across all of Estonia, calling for the gathering of a great and powerful army. They assembled in Sakala, by the river called Pala (now known as the Navesti River). Their leader and elder, Lembitu, summoned all the men from every county. And from Läänemaa, Harjumaa, Virumaa, Revala, Järvamaa, and Sakala, they came to him. Their number was six thousand...

— Chronicle of Henry of Livonia

The army assembled around 6 September and waited for 15 days for their allies from Novgorod to arrive.

The promised reinforcements from Prince Svjatoslav, which according to Henry of Livonia had been pledged to the Estonian forces, ultimately never reached them. The chronicle does not state a reason for this, but it has been suggested that Svjatoslav, who had only recently become prince of Novgorod, held relatively weak authority there (he would lose his position a year later) and was likely preoccupied with internal political struggles, leading him to break his promise.

Another theory suggests that while preparations for the campaign may have begun, the reinforcements arrived too late to reach Sakala in time. This could have been due to the larger scale and complexity of mobilization in Novgorod compared to Estonia, which was not adequately taken into account by the parties involved.

Upon hearing news of the outcome of the battle, the Novgorodian forces may have called off the campaign altogether, as is known to have happened after the Siege of Tartu in 1224.

When news of the Estonian and Novgorodian plans reached Riga, a 3,000-strong army was rapidly assembled. It consisted of Brothers of the Sword, men of the Bishop of Riga, crusaders, Livonians, and Latgalians. Their objective was to march into Sakala and prevent the possible union of Prince Svjatoslav’s forces with the Estonians gathered at the Navesti river.

The commander of the forces from Livonia was likely the Master of the Order, Volkwin. Other prominent leaders included Count Albert of Lauenburg, Abbot Bernhard of Daugavgrīva Monastery, Dean Johannes of Riga Cathedral, and Caupo.

Near Sakala, possibly by the Säde River or in Ēvele, the army paused and was reorganized into battle columns. The Germans took the central route, Livonians the right, and Latgalians the left. From captives taken in the villages, they learned the size of the opposing army and that it was advancing toward them in battle formation.

Proceeding cautiously, the army reached the vicinity of Viljandi castle on the evening before St. Matthew’s Day, 21 September, and set up camp for the night.

According to Heiki Valk, it is possible that at least part of the Viljandi population was either allied with the Germans or remained neutral toward Lembitu’s campaign.

The following day, after holding mass, the army resumed its march. It was discovered that the Estonian forces had "turned aside to another location," so the Germans pursued them until the enemy suddenly appeared from the woods ahead, fully prepared for battle.

== Location ==
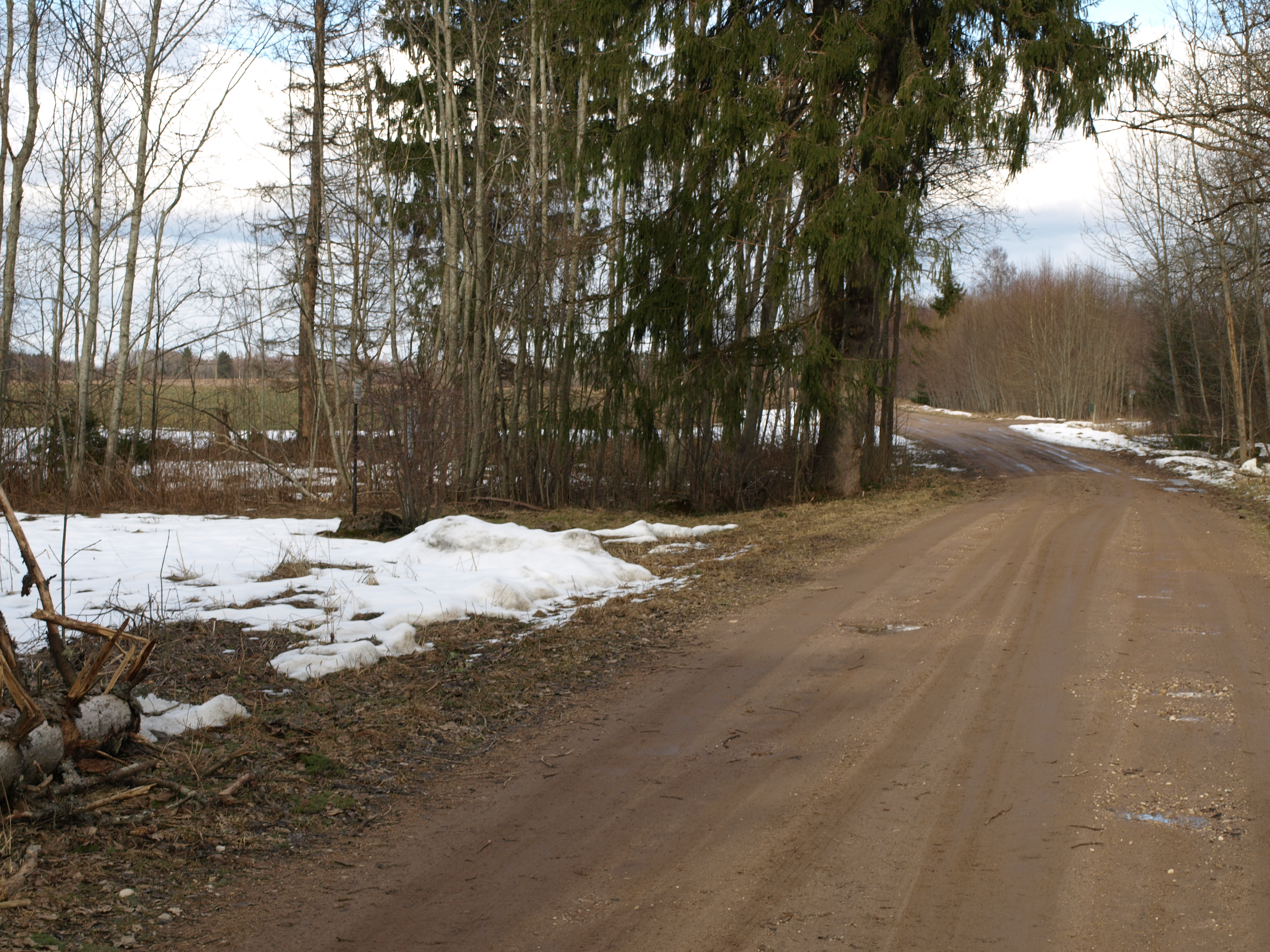
The Madi stone grave, part of the presumed battlefield

The exact site of the confrontation is not clearly stated in the sources. Henry of Livonia notes only that the clash took place slightly off the main road, while the Livonian Rhymed Chronicle claims the battle occurred more than a mile and a half (approx. 11 km) from Viljandi.

Among various scholarly hypotheses, Sulev Vahtre considers it most likely that the Estonian forces, wishing to avoid an immediate engagement, turned off the Navesti–Viljandi road near Lake Karula and moved northwest in the direction of Pärsti–Vanamõisa. The battle was likely fought in the area between Vanamõisa, Karuse, and the former Madi farm, a landscape that includes the former Rattama farm, Tammemägi hill, the Madi stone grave, and the former Risti Chapel (on Kirikumägi, or "Chapel Hill").

With its forests, groves, scrubby pastures, and moraine hills, the terrain in this location would have favored the more mobile Estonian troops over heavily armored knights. Current estimates suggest the main battle took place on the meadow between Madi and Rattama farms. Earlier authors had considered the site of Risti Chapel to be the main battleground.

== Battle ==
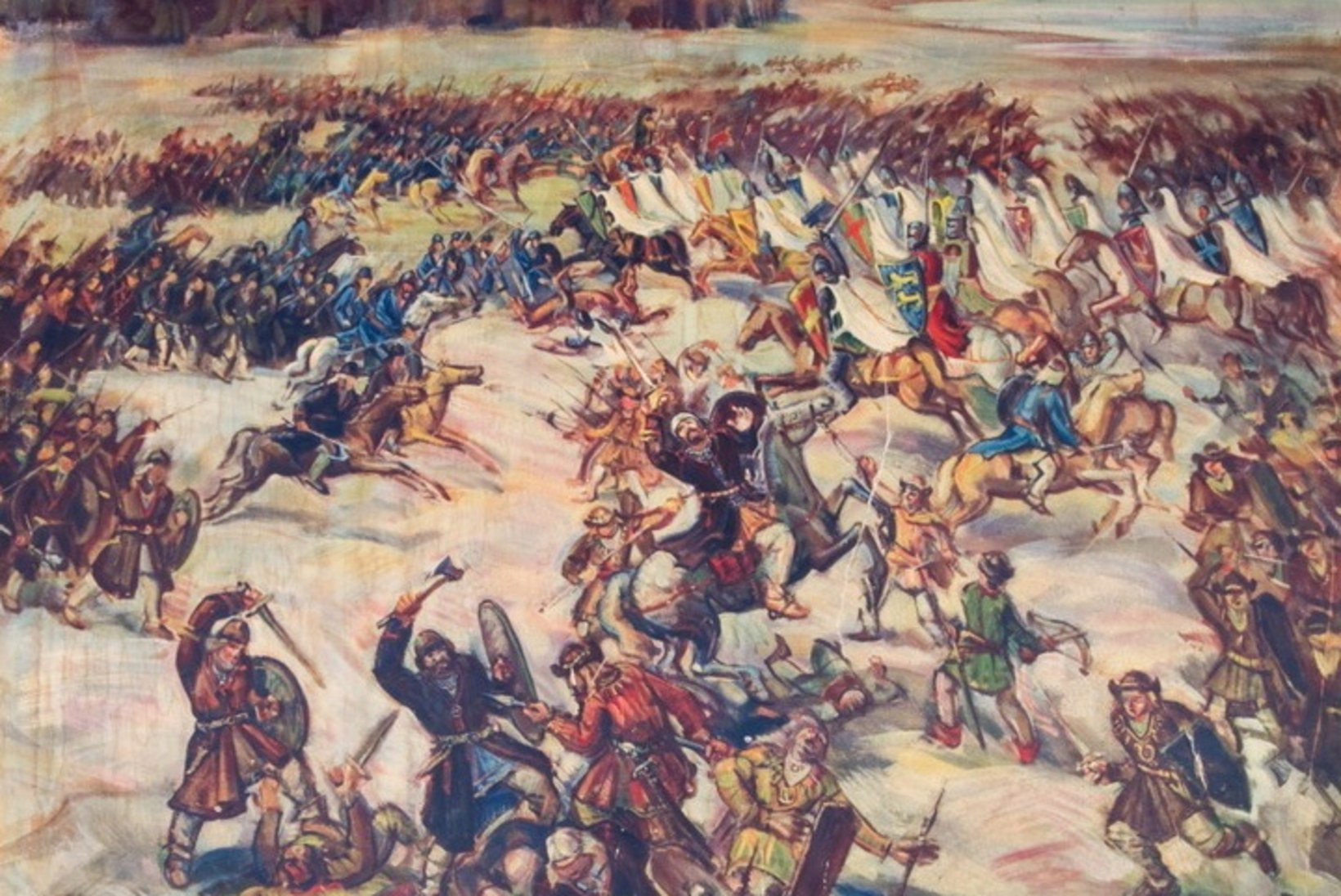
Battle of St. Matthew's Day

At the onset of the battle, the Livonian army maintained its previously organized formation: the Germans in the center, Livonians on the right flank, and Latgalians on the left. The German contingent was likely not a single cohesive unit but rather composed of smaller groups: crusaders, Brothers of the Sword, vassals of the bishop, and merchants, consisting of both cavalry and infantry intermingled.

The Estonian forces were also divided into three separate divisions. According to Henry of Livonia, the Sakalians were positioned on the right wing, opposite the Latgalians. Some scholars have speculated that the left flank was held by men from Läänemaa together with either Harjumaa or Revala warriors, while the center, which was described by Henry as the largest and strongest division, was made up of Vironians, Järvans, and Revalians (or Harrians).

The sudden appearance of the Estonian army from the forest was likely somewhat unexpected, and there was no time to use ambush tactics or launch arrows, which typically initiated battles. Nevertheless, the Livonian forces were better prepared for engagement than, for example, during the Battle of Ümera.

The German contingent advanced against the Estonians and, "slowly moving forward in their battle order," broke through the enemy lines and forced them into retreat. In the clash between the Sakalans and Latgalians, neither side initially gained the upper hand. However, upon witnessing the collapse of their center, the Sakalans also fled. This retreat may have been hastened by the Germans, having defeated their own opponents, turning to attack the Sakalans.

During the ensuing rout, many Sakalans were killed, including their leaders Lembitu, Vottele, Manivalde, and Vytamas.

On the other side of the battlefield, the Livonians, "seeing the spears of the Estonians cruelly flying toward them," initially fell back under the pressure of the attack and moved toward the Germans. Together, they began pursuing the fleeing Estonians. The Estonian flank that had been advancing then turned its attention to the German rear units, but these successfully repelled the attack and eventually forced the attackers to retreat as well.

All retreating Estonians were pursued; those who were caught were killed, and their horses taken by the victors.

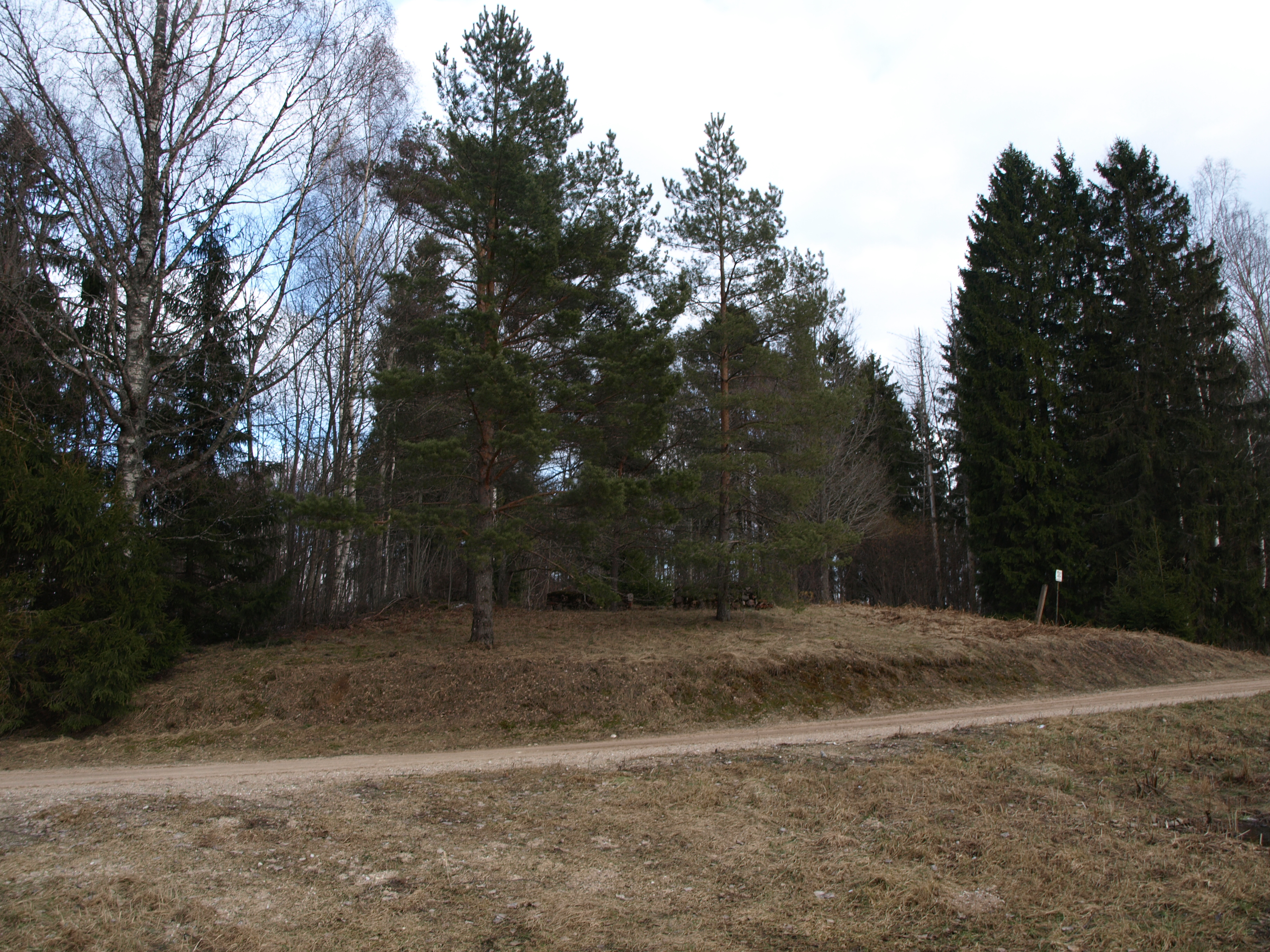
Ruins of the later Risti Chapel, presumed site of a follow-up battle

It has been suggested that a smaller follow-up battle, sometimes referred to as the Battle of the Cross, may have taken place near the Risti Chapel. This hypothesis is based on a version presented in 1527 by Danish historian Petrus Olai, who claimed that during a battle against pagans near Viljandi, Danish forces found themselves in a dire situation until a red flag with a white cross descended from the sky, later known as the Danish flag or Danebrog. This miraculous event allegedly turned the tide of the battle in favor of the Danes.

The connection to the Battle of St. Matthew’s Day is made plausible not only by the location but also by the presence of Albert of Orlamünde, a vassal of the Danish king, among the Christian forces. Paul Johansen associated the Danes’ critical moment with the retreat of the Livonian flank and the advance of Estonian forces behind the German lines, where Albert may have been positioned.

Artur Vassar, however, considered it more likely that the event described by Olai occurred after the main battle, when a Danish detachment pursuing fleeing Estonians came under attack by regrouped Estonian forces near Kirikumägi (later the site of the Risti Chapel), a location suitable for an ambush. Danish historian L. P. Fabricius believed the Risti Chapel was built at the site to commemorate the miracle of the cross-bearing flag.

Alternatively, it has been proposed that the chapel may have been erected atop a pre-Christian cult site—a common practice—and may not have been related to the Dannebrog legend at all. Archaeological excavations at the site of Risti Chapel have yielded no finds clearly linked to the Battle of St. Matthew’s Day, with the earliest datable artifacts originating from the 15th century. It is also possible that the narrative element of the flag legend, aside from the toponym, derives instead from the Battle of Lindanise, which is more commonly associated with the origins of the Danish flag.

== Aftermath ==
=== Casualties ===
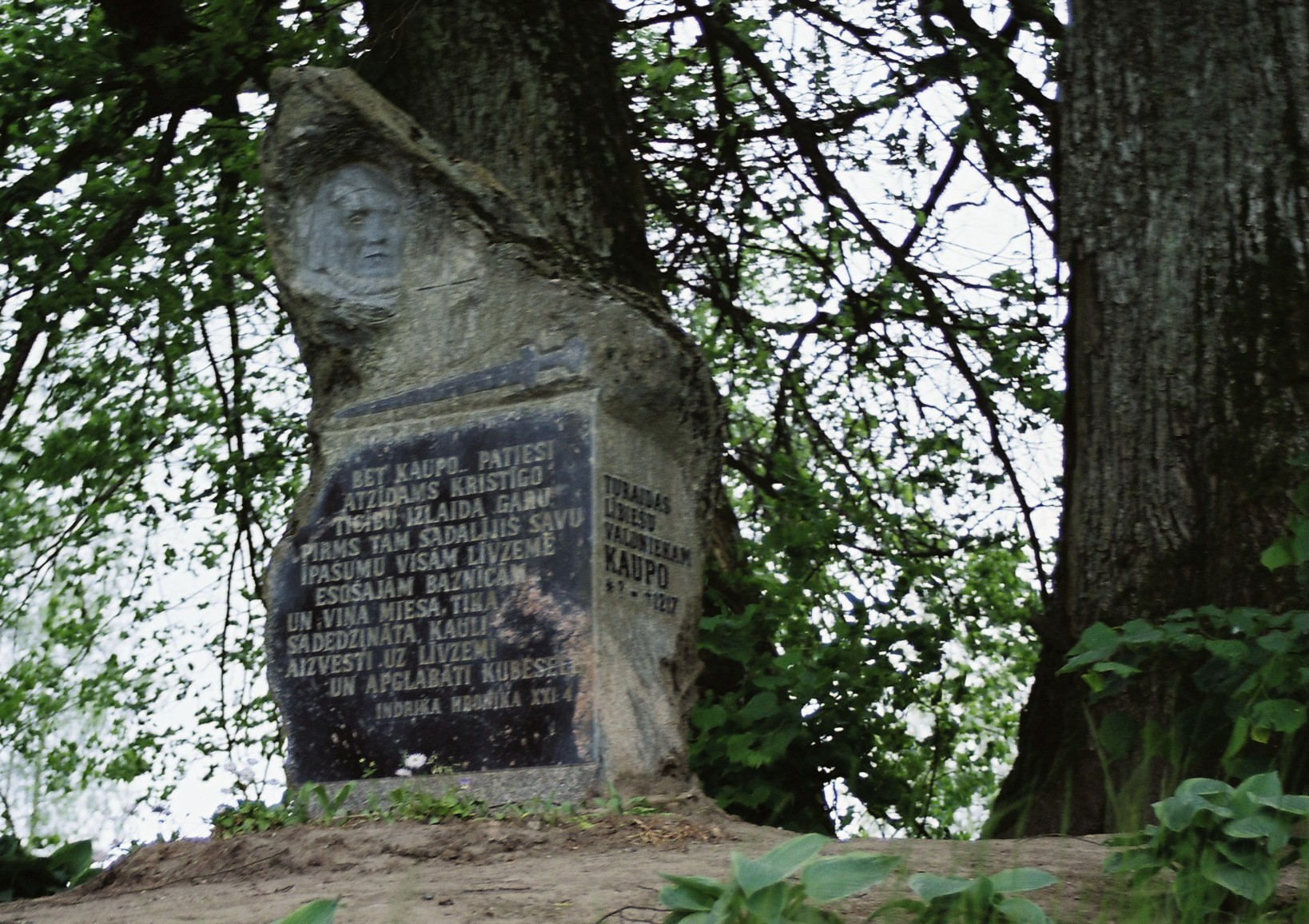
Memorial to Caupo, who was fatally wounded in the battle (in Krimulda)

According to Henry of Livonia, around 1,000 Estonians were killed in the battle, the Livonian Rhymed Chronicle puts the number at 1,400. Additionally, Henry notes that the victors seized 2,000 horses as spoils of war. While medieval chronicles are often prone to exaggeration, modern scholars consider casualties of this scale to be plausible. Neither source specifies the losses among the victors in detail, though Henry does mention that Caupo was fatally wounded. A later chronicle of the Teutonic Order claims that fewer than a hundred Christians died.

Historian Artur Vassar suggested that the bodies of the fallen Estonians were cremated and their bones transported to be buried in their home regions. Some earlier authors had speculated that the dead were buried on or near the battlefield—especially in the Madi burial site and Tammemägi near Rattama farm, but later archaeological excavations have not confirmed these theories.

=== Peace Settlement ===
After the battle, the victorious army advanced to Lembitu’s village by the Navesti river, where they remained in camp for three days, pillaging the surrounding area. They were approached by Unnepewe, Lembitu’s brother, along with several other Sakala elders who had survived the battle. These leaders renewed peace with the forces from Riga and offered hostages as a guarantee. Afterwards, the Christian army returned to Livonia with the spoils of war.

=== Impact ===
Scholars have offered differing assessments of the significance of what is considered the largest pitched battle of the Ancient Estonian War for Freedom. Many have interpreted it as effectively the final battle of the Ancient Estonian War for Freedom, in which the Estonian resistance was broken. Despite having numerical superiority, they were shown to be clearly militarily inferior.

However, historian Enn Tarvel has argued that, although it was not a definitive "final battle," the defeat was a major strategic and moral blow to the Estonians. Similarly, Artur Vassar and Sulev Vahtre have not considered the battle a decisive turning point. Citing subsequent events, they argue that the Estonians still possessed the will and resources for further military action.

Nonetheless, the defeat had a negative impact on cooperation between Estonia's various regions as well as with Novgorod, which was already evident during the 1224 Novgorodian campaign against Riga, when only Harjumaa joined the effort.
