= Metsepole =

County of medieval Livonia

Coordinates: 57°31′N 24°43′E

Livonian county of Metsepole Mõtsa Pūol
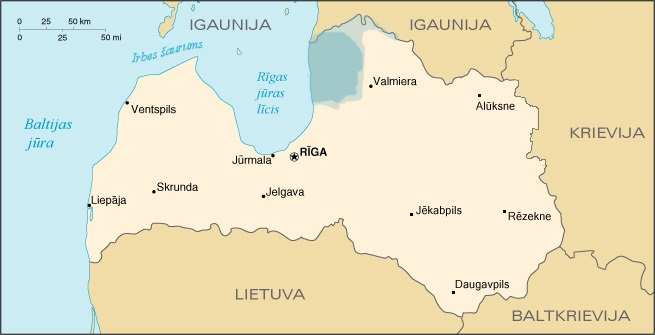
- Approximate boundaries of Metsepole in 12–13th centuries
- Common languages: Livonian
- Religion: Livonian paganism
- Elder
Succeeded by
Bishopric of Riga

Metsepole (Livonian: Mõtsa Pūol) was a medieval Livonian county inhabited by the Finnic-speaking Livonians, situated on the east coast of the Gulf of Riga, in most part at the northwest of the Vidzeme region of what is now Latvia, and including some adjacent areas in the present-day Pärnu County of Estonia. Metsepole was bordered by the ancient Estonian Sakala County to the north, Latgalian Tālava to the east and Livonian county of Turaida to the south.

During the Livonian Crusade in the beginning of the 13th century, the crusading Livonian Brothers of the Sword led by Albert of Riga began to occupy the shores of the Gulf of Riga. By 1206, Metsepole had been taken over by the crusaders and incorporated into the Bishopric of Riga in 1255.

In 1201, the Bishop Albert von Buxhövden founded the City of Riga as a Christian settlement at the mouth of the river Daugava. When this did not immediately induce the Livonians, Estonians, and Baltic peoples in its hinterland to convert, a knightly order was formed, the Livonian Brothers of the Sword, primarily consisting of Low Germans, to bring salvation to the pagans by force. In a campaign which was a part of the wars known as the Northern Crusades, these knights defeated, subdued and converted the Livonians in 1206 and 1207.

The main centres of Metsepole were located at the hillforts in Skulte, Liepupe and Limbaži. In 1206, the first Christian priest from Riga, Alexander, arrived in Metsepole. Already in 1207 there was a Christian parish in Metsepole. In the winter 1210, a crusader army from Riga went through Metsepole to attack Estonian county of Soontagana. It was followed by an Estonian revenge raid in Metsepole and whole region was heavily devastated. In 1211, Estonians again invaded Metsepole.

== See also ==
- Archbishopric of Riga
- Eldership of Samogitia
- Lembitu
- Livonian Crusade
- Principality of Kukenois
- Sackalia
