= Northern Crusades =

12th- and 13th-century crusades around the Baltic Sea

The Northern Crusades, or Baltic Crusades, were military campaigns conducted by several Catholic kingdoms and military orders in an effort to Christianize all the pagans (Balts, Finns, and West Slavs) around the southern and eastern shores of the Baltic Sea. The most notable of these campaigns were the Prussian and Livonian Crusades, the latter of which also fought against the Orthodox Christian states of Novgorod and Pskov. In some cases, such as with the Wendish Crusade, the conflicts were partly aimed at controlling the rich resources found in these lands. The Swedish Crusades were fought against Finns, Tavastians, and Karelians.

Some of these wars were explicitly regarded as crusades during the Middle Ages. For example, the war against the Estonians and the "other pagans in those parts" was authorized by Pope Alexander III's 1171 crusade bull, Non parum animus noster (Our mind is deeply [troubled/distressed]).

== Background ==
At the start of the northern crusades, Christian monarchs across northern Europe commissioned forays into territories that comprised modern-day Estonia, Finland, Latvia, Lithuania, Poland, and Russia. The indigenous populations of pagans suffered forced baptisms and the ravages of military occupation. The ascendant Teutonic Order, a German military religious order founded as a hospital around 1190 and established as a military order in 1198, spearheaded these incursions and profited immensely from the crusades, as did German merchants who fanned out along trading routes traversing the Baltic frontier.

The official starting point for the Northern Crusades was Pope Celestine III's call in 1195, but the Catholic kingdoms of Scandinavia, Poland, and the Holy Roman Empire had begun moving to subjugate their pagan neighbors even earlier (see Christianization of Pomerania). The non-Christian peoples who were objects of the campaigns at various dates included:

- The Polabian Wends, Sorbs, and Obotrites between the Elbe and Oder Rivers (by the Saxons, Danes, and Poles, beginning with the Wendish Crusade in 1147).
- The Finns proper in the 1150s in the First Crusade by the Swedes; by the Danes in 1191 and 1202; Tavastia in 1249 in the Second Crusade by the Swedes; and Karelia in 1293 in the Third Crusade by the Swedes. Christianization in these areas, however, had started earlier.
- Livonians, Latgallians, Selonians, and Estonians (by the Germans and Danes, 1193–1227).
- Semigallians and Curonians (1219–1290).
- Old Prussians (1219 and 1222).
- Lithuanians and Samogitians (by the Germans, unsuccessfully, 1236–1410).

Armed conflict between the Finnic peoples, Balts, and Slavs who lived by the Baltic shores, and their Saxon and Danish neighbors to the north and south, had been common for several centuries before the crusade. The previous battles had been caused largely by attempts to destroy castles and sea trade routes in order to gain economic advantage in the region. The crusade followed this pattern of conflict, albeit now inspired and prescribed by the pope and undertaken by papal knights and armed monks.

- Norway
- Germany
- Denmark
- Sweden
- Teutonic Order
- Livonian Sword Brothers / Order

== Wendish Crusade ==
The campaigns started with the 1147 Wendish Crusade against the Polabian Slavs (or Wends) of what is now northern and eastern Germany. The crusade occurred parallel to the Second Crusade to the Holy Land and continued intermittently until the 16th century.

== Swedish Crusades ==
The Swedish crusades were campaigns by Sweden against Finns, Tavastians, and Karelians during the period from 1150 to 1293. The wars with the Eastern Orthodox Novgorod Republic also had a religious aspect.

== Danish Crusades ==
The Danes are known to have made at least three crusades to Finland. The first mention of these crusades is from 1187, when crusader Esbern Snare mentioned a major victory over the Finns in his Christmas-feast speech. The next known crusades were made in 1191 and in 1202, the latter led by the bishop of Lund, Anders Sunesen, with his brothers.

Journalist Matts Dumell explains that there was a rivalry between the churches in Denmark and Sweden that led to competition between the two countries, mostly in the form of conquests which gained adherents to Christianity and propaganda wins against each other. Thus there is virtually no possibility that Finland was already part of Sweden in the mid-1100s to early 1200s. Sweden had civil strife from within during this period as well, in the form of several battles and assassinations between several strongmen from the House of Sverker and the House of Erik. Only in 1216 would the pope declare that the Finnish areas should no longer be part of the Danish kingdom but instead be placed under the Swedish king's "protection."

It was not until 1165 that the Roman Catholic Church started to "expect" bigger territorial gains and adherents from the Danes in missionary work in Finland and Estonia, the latter having undergone some conversion to Christianity before that date. There is scholarly debate over how successful the Danes ultimately were and whether they gained any permanent foothold or territory in Finland before the Swedes began their efforts. Dumell debates whether places such as a fort in Saxby near Porvoo could be a product of this Danish presence, possibly built during their crusade in 1191.

Dumell lists several possible crusades by Denmark to Finland:

- King Canute VI (Knut Waldemarsson) led a "victorious" crusade to Finland in 1191, an expedition Dumell deems well attested to because of its mention in multiple ancient sources. The king would also later embark on crusades against Estonia in 1194 and 1196–1197.
- In 1202, Bishop Anders Sunesen and his brothers, Ebbe and Lars, are said to have conducted a crusade into Finland. Attestation to this crusade is very sparse and its veracity uncertain, however; and Dumell debates if it were confused with another expedition in 1206 to Ösel or was a real and distinct event.
- There was possibly a Danish crusade against Finland in 1209, but this is very poorly attested to and hard to confirm.

== Livonian Crusade ==
By the 12th century, the peoples inhabiting the lands now known as Estonia, Latvia, and Lithuania formed a pagan wedge between increasingly powerful, rival Christian states—the Orthodox Church to their east and the Catholic Church to their west. The difference in creeds was one of the reasons they were able to resist being forcibly converted to a different religion. During a period of more than 150 years leading up to the arrival of German crusaders in the region, Estonia was attacked 13 times by the Russian principalities and by Denmark and Sweden as well, and in turn Estonia raided Denmark and Sweden. Although there were peaceful attempts by some Catholics to convert the Estonians, starting with missions dispatched by Adalbert, Archbishop of Bremen, in 1045–1072, these peaceful efforts seem to have had limited success.

=== Campaign against the Livonians (1198–1212) ===
Moving in the wake of German merchants following old Viking trading routes, Meinhard, a German canon later proclaimed a saint, landed at the mouth of the Daugava River in present-day Latvia in 1180 and six years later was made bishop. Pope Celestine III proclaimed a crusade against the Baltic pagans in 1195, which was reiterated by Pope Innocent III, and a crusading expedition led by Meinhard's successor as bishop, Berthold of Hanover, landed in Livonia (part of present-day Latvia, surrounding the Gulf of Riga) in 1198. Although the crusaders won their first battle, Bishop Berthold was mortally wounded and the crusaders were repelled.

In 1199, Albert of Buxhoeveden was appointed by Archbishop Hartwig II of Bremen to Christianize the Baltic countries. By the time Albert died 30 years later, the conquest and formal Christianization of present-day Estonia and northern Latvia was complete. Albert began his task by touring the empire, preaching a crusade against the Baltic countries, assisted in this effort by a papal bull declaring that fighting the Baltic heathens was of the same rank as participating in a crusade to the Holy Land. Landing at the mouth of the Daugava River in 1200 with only 23 ships and 500 soldiers, the archbishop's efforts helped Albert ensure that a constant flow of recruits followed. The first crusaders usually arrived to fight during the spring and returned to their homes in the autumn.

To ensure a permanent military presence, the Livonian Brothers of the Sword were founded in 1202. The founding, led by Bishop Albert at the market at Riga in 1201, attracted citizens from the Empire and economic prosperity ensued. At Albert's request, Pope Innocent III dedicated the Baltic countries to the Virgin Mary to popularize recruitment to his army, as is noticeable in one of the names given to Livonia at the time, Terra Mariana (Land of Mary). The name "Mary's Land" has also survived up to modern times.

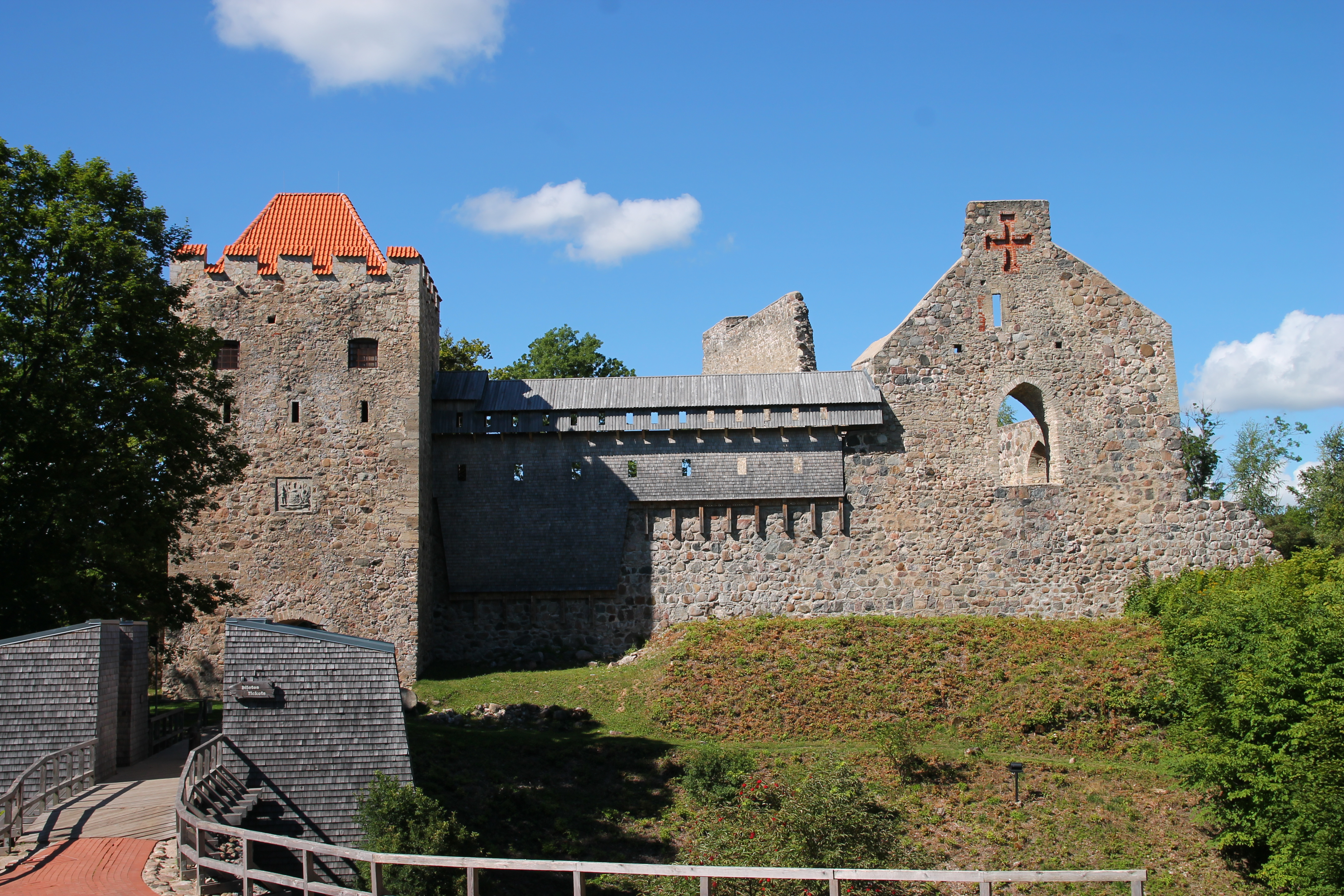
Ruins of the castle in Sigulda from which the Livonian Order controlled the Gauja River valley for centuries.

In 1206, the crusaders subdued the Livonian stronghold in Turaida on the right bank of the Gauja River, the ancient trading route to Northwestern Russia. In order to gain control over the left bank of the Gauja River, a stone castle was built in Sigulda before 1210. By 1211, the Livonian province of Metsepole (now Limbaži district) and the mixed Livonian–Latgallian-inhabited county of Idumea (now Straupe) were converted to the Roman Catholic faith. The first prominent Livonian to be christened was their leader, Caupo of Turaida.

The last battle against the Livonians was the siege of Satezele hillfort near Sigulda in 1212. The Livonians, who had been paying tribute to the East Slavic Principality of Polotsk, first considered the Germans useful allies. As the German grip tightened, however, the Livonians rebelled against the crusaders and the christened chief was unseated. The German crusaders enlisted newly baptized Livonian warriors to participate in their campaigns against Latgallians and Selonians (1208–1209); Estonians (1208–1227); and Semigallians, Samogitians, and Curonians (1219–1290). Caupo of Turaida remained an ally of the crusaders until his death in the Battle of St. Matthew's Day in 1217.

=== Campaign against the Latgallians and Selonians (1208–1224) ===
Baltic tribes c. 1200.

After the subjugation of the Livonians, the crusaders turned their attention to the Latgallian principalities to the east, along the Gauja and Daugava Rivers. The military alliance in 1208 and later conversion from Greek Orthodoxy to Roman Catholicism of the Principality of Tālava was the only peaceful subjugation of the Baltic tribes during the Nordic crusades. The ruler of Tālava, Tālivaldis (Talibaldus de Tolowa), became the most loyal ally of German crusaders against the Estonians. He died a Catholic martyr in 1215.

The war against the Latgallian and Selonian countries along the Daugava waterway started in 1208 with the occupation of the Orthodox Principality of Koknese and the Selonian Sēlpils hillfort. The campaign continued in 1209 with an attack on the Orthodox Principality of Jersika (known as Lettia), which crusaders had accused of being allied with Lithuanian pagans. After the defeat, the king of Jersika, Visvaldis, became the vassal of the bishop of Livonia and received part of his country (southern Latgale) as a fiefdom.

The Selonian stronghold of Sēlpils was briefly the seat of a Selonian diocese (1218–1226) but then came under the rule of the Livonian Order. Eventually, the stone castle of Selburg was built in its place. Only in 1224, with the division of Tālava and Adzele counties between the Bishop of Riga and the Order of the Swordbearers, did the Latgallian countries come under the possession of the German conquerors. The territory of the former Principality of Jersika was divided between the Bishop of Riga and the Livonian Order in 1239.

=== Campaign against the Estonians (1208–1224) ===
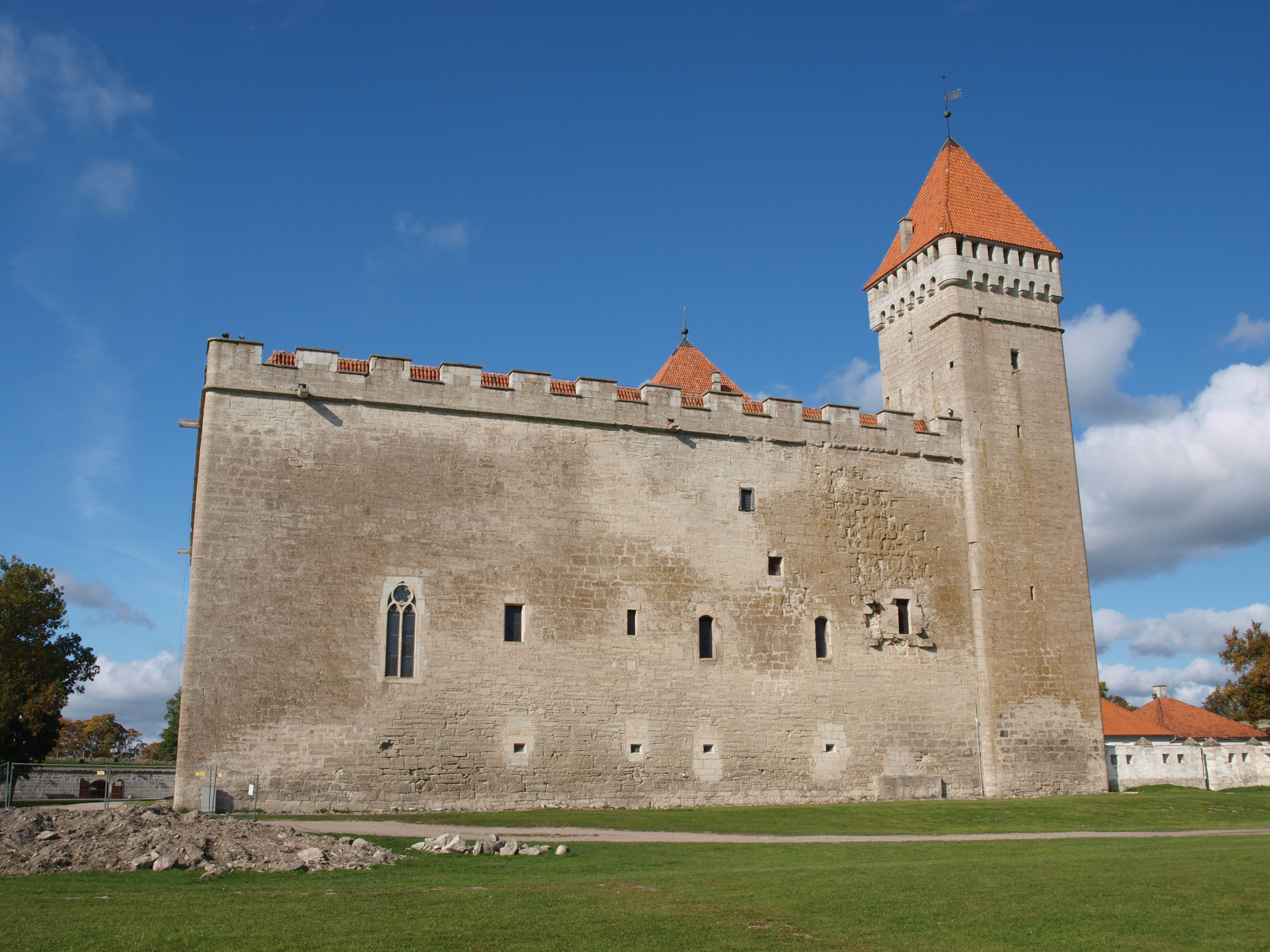
Kuressaare Castle, Estonia, constructed by the Teutonic Order.

By 1208, the Germans were strong enough to begin operations against the Estonians, who were divided into eight territories of varying sizes led by elders with limited mutual cooperation. From 1208 to 1227, the war parties of both sides rampaged through the Livonian, Northern Latgallian, and Estonian counties. The Livonians and Latgallians normally allied with the crusaders, with the Principalities of Polotsk and Pskov appearing as allies of different sides at different times.

Hillforts, which were the key centers of Estonian counties, were besieged and captured numerous times. A truce between the war-weary sides was established for three years (1213–1215) and proved generally more favorable to the Germans, who consolidated their political position, while the Estonians were unable to develop their system of loose alliances into a centralized state. The Livonian leader Kaupo was killed in battle near Viljandi (Fellin) on the 21st of September, 1217. The battle was a crushing defeat for the Estonians, whose leader Lembitu was also killed. Since 1211, his name had come to the attention of the German chroniclers as a notable Estonian elder, becoming the central figure of the Estonian resistance.

The Christian kingdoms of Denmark and Sweden were also greedy for conquests on the Eastern shores of the Baltic. Whereas the Swedes made only one failed foray, the Battle of Lihula, into western Estonia in 1220, the Danish fleet, headed by King Valdemar II of Denmark, had landed at the Estonian town of Lindanisse (present-day Tallinn) in 1219. After the Battle of Lindanisse, the Danes established a fortress that was besieged by Estonians in 1220 and 1223 but held out. Eventually, the whole of northern Estonia came under Danish control.

=== Wars against Saaremaa (1206–1261) ===
The last Estonian county to hold out against the invaders was the island county of Saaremaa (Ösel), whose war fleets had raided Denmark and Sweden during the years of fighting against the German crusaders.

In 1206, a Danish army, led by King Valdemar II and Bishop Andreas of Lund, landed on Saaremaa and attempted to establish a stronghold but without success. In 1216, the Livonian Brothers of the Sword and Estonian Bishop Theoderich joined forces and invaded Saaremaa over the frozen sea. The following spring in return, the Oeselians raided the territories in Latvia that were under German rule. In 1220, the Swedish army, led by King John I of Sweden and Karl Magnusson, Bishop of Linköping, conquered Lihula in Rotalia in Western Estonia. However, the Oeselians attacked the Swedish stronghold the same year, conquered it, and killed the entire Swedish garrison, including the bishop of Linköping.

In 1222, King Valdemar II attempted the second conquest of Saaremaa, this time establishing a stone fortress housing a strong garrison. The Danish stronghold was besieged, however, and surrendered within five days. The Danish garrison then returned to Reval, modern-day Tallinn, leaving behind Bishop Albert of Riga's brother Theodoric and a few others as hostages for peace. The castle was razed to the ground by the Oeselians.

A 20,000-strong army under the papal legate William of Modena crossed the frozen sea while the Saaremaa fleet was icebound in January of 1227. After the surrender of two major Oeselian strongholds, Muhu and Valjala, the Oeselians formally accepted Christianity.

In 1236, after the defeat of the Livonian Brothers of the Sword in the Battle of Saule, military action on Saaremaa broke out again. In 1261, warfare continued as the Oeselians had once more renounced Christianity and killed all the Germans on the island. A peace treaty was signed after the united forces of the Livonian Order, the Bishopric of Ösel-Wiek, and Danish Estonia, including mainland Estonians and Latvians, defeated the Oeselians by conquering their stronghold at Kaarma. Soon thereafter, the Livonian Order established a stone fort at Pöide.

=== Wars against the Curonians and Semigallians (1201–1290) ===
Although the Curonians attacked Riga in 1201 and 1210, Albert of Buxhoeveden, who in 1202 became the bishop of Riga, had been reluctant to conduct a large-scale campaign against them, considering Courland a tributary of King Valdemar II of Denmark. After Albert's death in 1229, the crusaders secured the peaceful submission of Vanemane (a county with a mixed Livonian, Oeselian, and Curonian population in the northeastern part of Courland) by treaty in 1230.

In the same year, however, the papal vice-legate Baldouin of Alnea annulled this agreement and concluded an agreement with the ruler (rex) of Bandava in the central Courland Lammekinus, delivering his kingdom into the hands of the papacy. Baldouin became the pope's delegate in Courland and bishop of Semigallia. However, the Germans complained about him to the Roman Curia, and in 1234 Pope Gregory IX removed Baldouin as his delegate.

After their decisive defeat in the Battle of Saule by the Samogitians and Semigallians, the remnants of the Livonian Brothers of the Sword were reorganized in 1237 as a subdivision of the Teutonic Order, and became known as the Livonian Order. In 1242, under the leadership of the master of the Livonian Order, Andrew of Groningen, the crusaders began the military conquest of Courland. They defeated the Curonians as far south as Embūte, near the contemporary border with Lithuania, and founded their main fortress at Kuldīga. In 1245, Pope Innocent IV allotted two-thirds of conquered Courland to the Livonian Order and one-third to the Bishopric of Courland.

At the Battle of Durbe in 1260, a force of Samogitians and Curonians overpowered the united forces of the Livonian and Teutonic Orders. However, over the following years, the crusaders gradually subjugated the Curonians and in 1267 concluded the peace treaty, stipulating the obligations and rights of their defeated rivals. The unconquered southern parts of their territories (Ceklis and Megava) were united under the rule of the Grand Duchy of Lithuania.

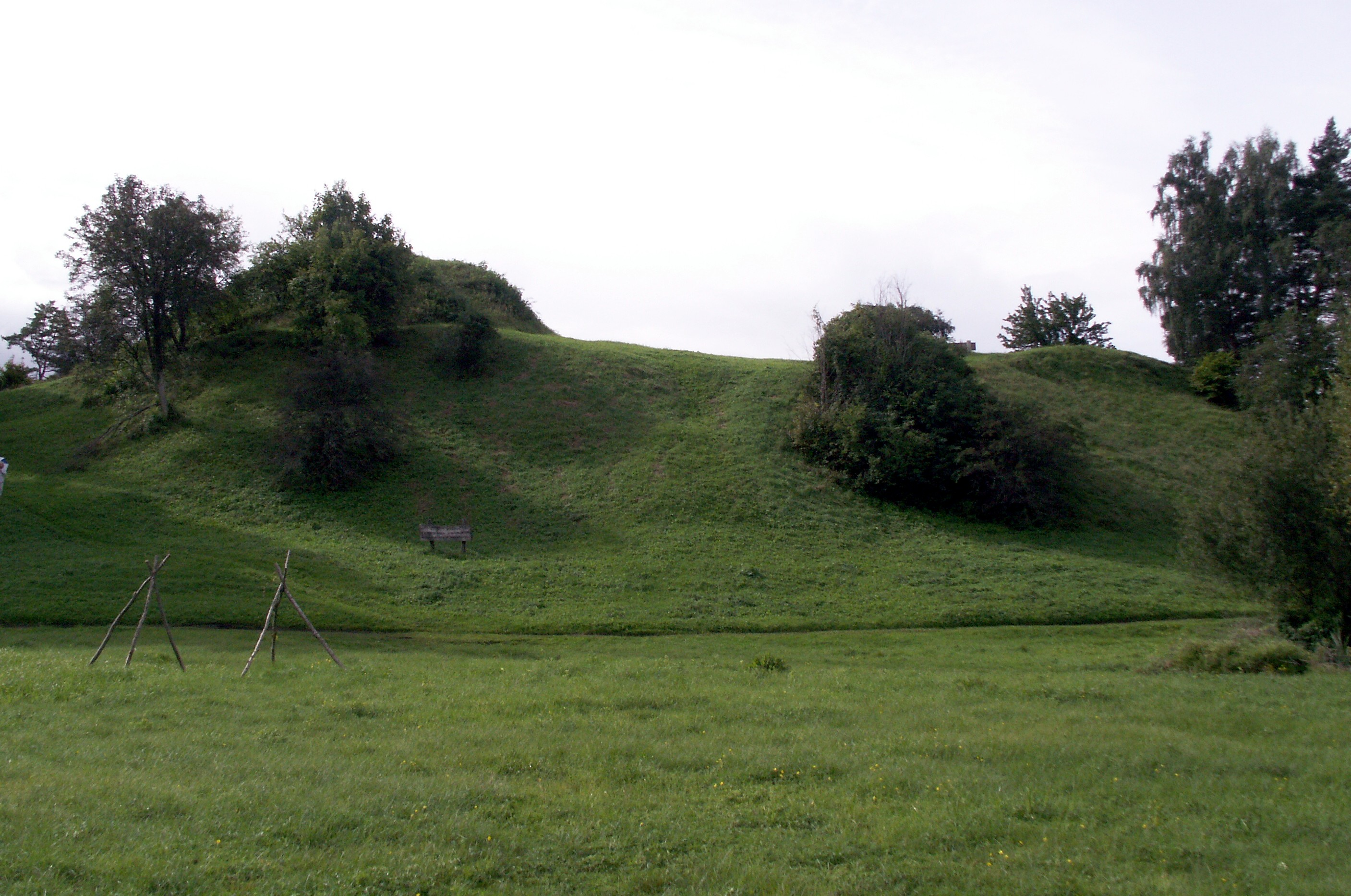
Tērvete castle hill in 2010.

The conquest of Semigallian counties started in 1219 when crusaders from Riga occupied Mežotne, the major port on the Lielupe waterway, and founded the Bishopric of Semigallia. In 1251, after several unsuccessful campaigns against the pagan Semigallian Duke Viestards and his Samogitian kinsfolk, the Roman Curia decided to abolish the Bishopric of Semigallia, dividing its territories between the Bishopric of Riga and the Livonian Order. In 1265, a stone castle was built at Jelgava, on the Lielupe waterway, and became the main military base for crusader attacks against the Semigallians. In 1271, the capital hillfort of Tērvete was conquered. However, Semigallians led by Duke Nameisis rebelled in 1279, and the Lithuanians under Grand Duke Traidenis defeated Livonian Order forces in the Battle of Aizkraukle.

Duke Nameisis' warriors unsuccessfully attacked Riga in 1280, provoking the siege of Turaida castle by around 14,000 crusaders in 1281. To conquer the remaining Semigallian hillforts, the Livonian Order's master Villekin of Endorpe built a castle called Heiligenberg ("Saints' Hill"), right next to the Tērvete castle in 1287. The same year, the Semigallians made another attempt to conquer Riga but were unsuccessful. Although Livonian knights attacked them on their return home, the Semigallians defeated them in the Battle of Garoza. Villekin and at least 35 knights lost their lives. The new master of the Livonian Order, Konrad von Hattstein, organized the last campaigns against the Semigallians in 1289 and 1290. The hillforts of Dobele, Rakte, and Sidabre were conquered, and most of the Semigallian warriors joined the Samogitian and Lithuanian forces.

== Prussia and Lithuania ==
=== Campaigns of Bolesław the Curly and Konrad of Mazovia ===
From 1147, the Polish duke of Mazovia, Boleslaw the Curly, led many expeditions against pagan Prussia, with some of them being successful and resulting in the conquest of parts of the Prussian territories.

Konrad I, the Polish duke of Mazovia, unsuccessfully attempted to conquer pagan Prussia in crusades in 1219 and 1222. Taking the advice of the first bishop of Prussia, Christian of Oliva, Duke Konrad founded the crusading Order of Dobrzyń (or Dobrin) in 1220. However, the order was largely ineffective, and Duke Konrad's campaigns against the Old Prussians were answered by incursions into the already captured territory of Culmerland (Chełmno Land). Subjected to constant Prussian counter-raids, Konrad wanted to stabilize the north of the Duchy of Masovia in this fight over the border area of Chełmno Land. Mazovia became part of Poland in the 10th century, but native Prussians, Yotvingians, and Lithuanians were still living in the territories north of Mazovia, where there were no settled borders. Konrad asked the Roman Catholic monastic order of the Teutonic Knights in 1226 to come to Prussia to suppress the Old Prussians; and he supported the Knights financially, militarily, and by providing supplies.

=== Campaigns of Bolesław the Chaste and Leszek the Black ===
Campaigns against Yotvingians and Lithuanians were also conducted in the years 1248–1282 by Princes Bolesław V the Chaste, Siemowit, and Leszek the Black. They defeated the forces of pagans invading Mazovia, Kujawy, and the Lublin region. They also carried out several expeditions to Yotvingian territories.

== Teutonic Order in Livonia and Votia (1237–1410) ==
The Northern Crusades provided both the rationale and the opportunity for the growth and expansion of the Teutonic Order. Duke Konrad I of Masovia (a region in east-central Poland, also spelled Mazovia) appealed to the Teutonic Knights to defend his borders and subdue the pagan Old Prussians in 1226. In 1234, a significant expedition began in which Polish forces, allied with the Teutonic Knights, defeated the Old Prussians in a battle on the Dzierzgoń River. While engaged in the decades-long subjugation of the Prussians, the Teutonic Knights also entered into conflict with the Grand Duchy of Lithuania.

When the Livonian Brothers of the Sword were heavily defeated by Samogitians and Semigallians at the Battle of Saule in 1236, coinciding with Estonian revolts, the remnants of the order were incorporated into the Teutonic Order in 1237, becoming its autonomous Livonian branch. This allowed the Teutonic Order to exercise political control over large territories in the Baltic region. King Mindaugas of Lithuania was baptized alongside his wife around 1251 and crowned in 1253 with papal approval in an attempt to stop crusader attacks. However, this failed to prevent further conflict. The Teutonic Knights failed to subdue Lithuania.

The country began its official conversion to Catholic Christianity following the marriage of Grand Duke Jogaila to Jadwiga, the young ruling queen (crowned as king) of Poland, and Jogaila's own baptism in 1386. The formal Christianization of Lithuania commenced in 1387. However, the conflict persisted even after Lithuania's official conversion, culminating in the pivotal Battle of Grunwald (also known as Tannenberg or Žalgiris) in 1410. In this battle, the allied forces of Poland and Lithuania, supported by Tatar, Moldovan, Ruthenian, and Czech contingents, decisively defeated the Teutonic Knights.

In 1221, Pope Honorius III expressed concern about conflicts in the Finnish region involving Novgorod, after receiving alarming information from the archbishop of Uppsala in Sweden. Pope Honorius authorized the bishop of Finland to establish a trade embargo against the "barbarians" in the belief that they threatened Christianity in Finland. The specific identity or origin of these "barbarians," presumably cited from the archbishop's letter, remains unclear and may not have been known precisely, even by the pope.

However, when the call for an embargo was renewed around 1229, it specifically targeted Russians (Novgorodians). According to papal letters from that year, (Note: See Diplomatarium Fennicum documents 72, 73, 74, 75, 76, 77, and 78.) the bishop of Finland requested Pope Gregory IX to authorize or call for the implementation of a trade embargo against the Novgorodians by Baltic Sea ports (including Visby, Riga, and Lübeck). In the following decade (around 1232–1237), Pope Gregory IX also requested the Livonian Brothers of the Sword to send troops to protect Finland from Novgorod incursions. Whether any knights were actually dispatched remains unknown.

The Teutonic Order's attempts to conquer Orthodox Russian lands (particularly the Republics of Pskov and Novgorod) were an enterprise endorsed by Pope Gregory IX and a component of the Northern Crusades. One of the major setbacks for the eastward expansion into Russian principalities was the Battle of the Ice in 1242, in which Novgorodian forces defeated the Livonian branch of the Teutonic Order. Separately, with or without explicit papal blessing for every campaign, Sweden also undertook several crusades against Orthodox Novgorod.

Missionary work and crusading in Estonia by the Livonian Order and other Catholic powers led to conflicts with Novgorod, which had its own interests in the region, as demonstrated by its attempts to subjugate, raid, or convert the pagan Estonians. The Estonians, in turn, sometimes sought alliances with Novgorod against the crusaders.

Intermittent warfare between Novgorod and the crusader states in Livonia continued. These conflicts ultimately halted the eastward expansion of the Livonian Order. Novgorodian attempts to gain control over Estonia and Livonia also failed. The region (Terra Mariana) remained under the complex political control of the Livonian Confederation, primarily the Livonian Order and powerful prince-bishops.

== See also ==
- Christianization of Lithuania
- Chronology of the Northern Crusades
- Finnish–Novgorodian wars
- Ostsiedlung
- Swedish–Novgorodian wars

== Bibliography ==
- Paul Srodecki and Norbert Kersken, eds. The Expansion of the Faith: Crusading on the Frontiers of Latin Christendom in the High Middle Ages. Turnhout: Brepols, 2022. ISBN 978-2-503-58880-3
