= Tālivaldis =

- Elder of Tālava
- Reign: until 1215
- Successor: His sons, Rameks and Drivinalds
- Died: 1215; Trikāta
- Issue: Several sons

Tālivaldis or Tālibalds (Latin: Thalibaldus de Tolowa; died 1215) was a Latgalian elder, the ruler of Tālava, whose support for Albert of Riga and the German crusaders brought about his death at the hands of the native Baltic peoples.

== Biography ==
Tālivaldis's date of birth is unknown. He is first noted in 1208 when he fought against the Saccalians and Ugandians as an ally of the Latgalian dukes Rūsiņš and Varidots. Tālivaldis was baptised in the Eastern Orthodox faith sometime before 1208 when he was a vassal of the Pskov Republic.

Tālivaldis became a vassal of Albert of Riga and was thus involved in the Northern Crusades against the Estonian tribes as an ally of the German crusaders. In 1211, the Estonians raided Tālava as revenge for the Latgalian support of the crusaders and pillaged the area round Trikāta, Tālivaldis's native region.

In 1212, Tālivaldis, as a vassal of Albert of Riga, did not support the Autīne revolt, a joint Latgalian and Livonian revolt against the crusaders.

In 1213, the Lithuanians invaded Tālava. They captured Tālivaldis in his castle at Trikāta and were taking him back to Lithuania as a prisoner, but he managed to escape.

When the Northern Crusades began, Tālava fell into the spheres of influence of both Bishop Albert of Riga and Pskov. At this point, Tālivaldis chose to support Albert, in the hope that the Germans would help the Tālavians to resist the pressure on them from the Russians. However, Bishop Albert and the German crusaders had no interest in maintaining an independent Latgalian state. Once the Tālavians and the Estonians were involved in a war of attrition, Albert seized the opportunity for the benefit of the German occupiers.

Tālivaldis was killed in 1215 by invading Ugandians, who, according to the Livonian Chronicle of Henry, burnt Tālivaldis alive. Soon afterwards, Tālivaldis's sons Rameka and Drivinalds raided Ugandia in revenge and plundered it severely. After Tālivaldis's death, his lands were divided between the crusaders and Albert of Riga. Talivaldis's sons changed from Orthodoxy to Roman Catholicism and became vassals of Albert of Riga.

== Sources and external links ==
- Chronicle of Henry of Livonia
- "Tālava", in Latviešu konversācijas vārdnīca (21st edn), 42104 - 42110
- "Tālivaldis", in Latvijas padomju enciklopēdija (9th edn), p. 486
- Švābe, A., "Tālava" in Straumes un avoti (3rd edn), pp. 179-210. Sakārtojusi Švābe, L. Lincoln (Nebraska): Pilskalns, 1965 (in Latvian)
- Hypothetical portrait of Tālivaldis
