= Lõhavere =

Village in Estonia

- Village
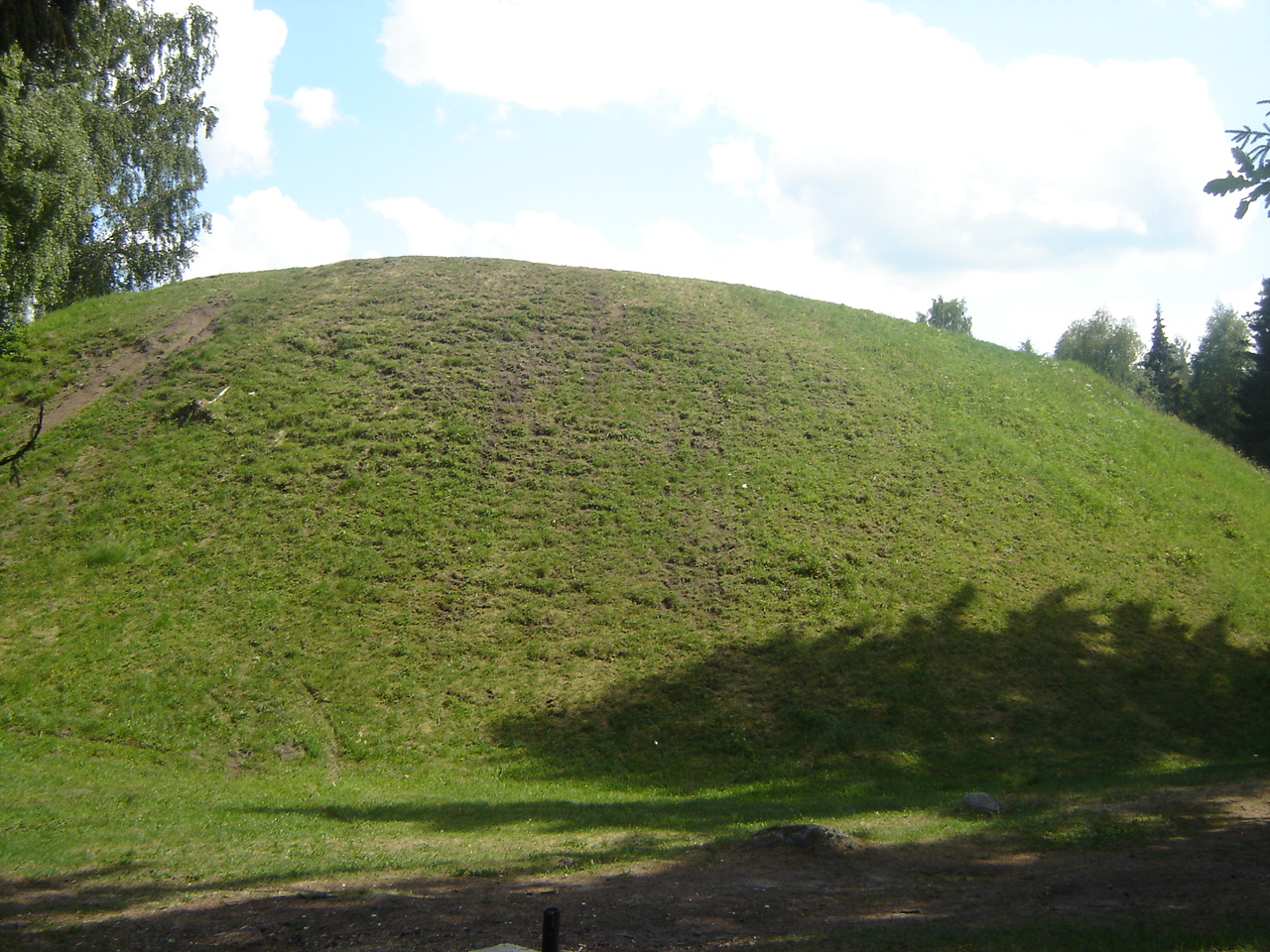
- Site of Lõhavere stronghold.

- Location in Estonia
- Coordinates: 58°32′58″N 25°28′58″E
- Country: Estonia
- County: Viljandi County
- Municipality: Põhja-Sakala Parish

Population (2009)
  - Total: 183

Lõhavere (German: Lehowa) is a village in Põhja-Sakala Parish, Viljandi County in central Estonia. It has a population of 183 (as of 2009).

== See also ==
- Battle of Lehola (1215)
