= Chukhna =

Obsolete Russian-language term for some Finnic peoples

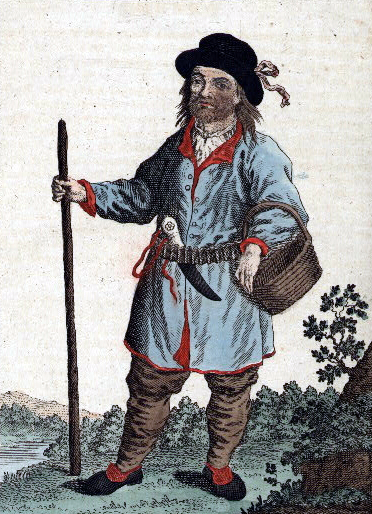
An ethnographic illustration of a Chukhna peasant, 1799

Chukhna, Chukhnas, Chukhontsy (singular: Chukhonets (male), Chukhonka (female)) is an obsolete Russian term for Balto-Finnic peoples; particularly Finns, Estonians, Karelians, Ingrian Finns.

It is thought to be a derivative from the ethnonym Chud.

The 18th century Linguarum totius orbis vocabularia comparativa of Peter Simon Pallas has a vocabulary of the "Chukhna language".

Vladimir Dal, in his Explanatory Dictionary of the Living Great Russian Language, writes that "chukhonets" was a reference to suburban Finns used in St. Petersburg.

In modern usage, the words are considered ethnic slurs for Finns and Estonians.

In 2000, TV-journalist Leonid Parfenov's usage of a term considering Vladimir Putin was perceived as an insult towards the President of Russia. Parfenov denied the claims, saying:

That was normal. Literally, I said: "a type of whitish northern appearance which is popularly called "chukhon blond" (Russian: чухонь белобрысая, romanized: chukhon belobrysaya). How else? They don't say "blond of medium height". My cousin, Sasha, looks just like that. And Baba Katya, the kingdom of heaven to her, always called him that. This is very common in the North: Novgorod, St. Petersburg, Vologda, Arkhangelsk region, Karelia ... By the way, we have discussed this with Sveta Sorokina who is from St. Petersburg. I am also partly from St. Petersburg, because I studied in St. Petersburg. And we said this is ours, and many do not know that "chukhon" is northern Russia. As a matter of fact, I am also a chukhon by birth. Yesenin has a verse line: "Russia has got lost in Mordva and Chud."

== See also ==
- Chukhon Fantasia (1864) by Alexander Dargomyzhsky
- Ryssä, a Finnish term for a Russian person, considered derogatory today
