= Chud =

Old Slavic term for Finnic peoples

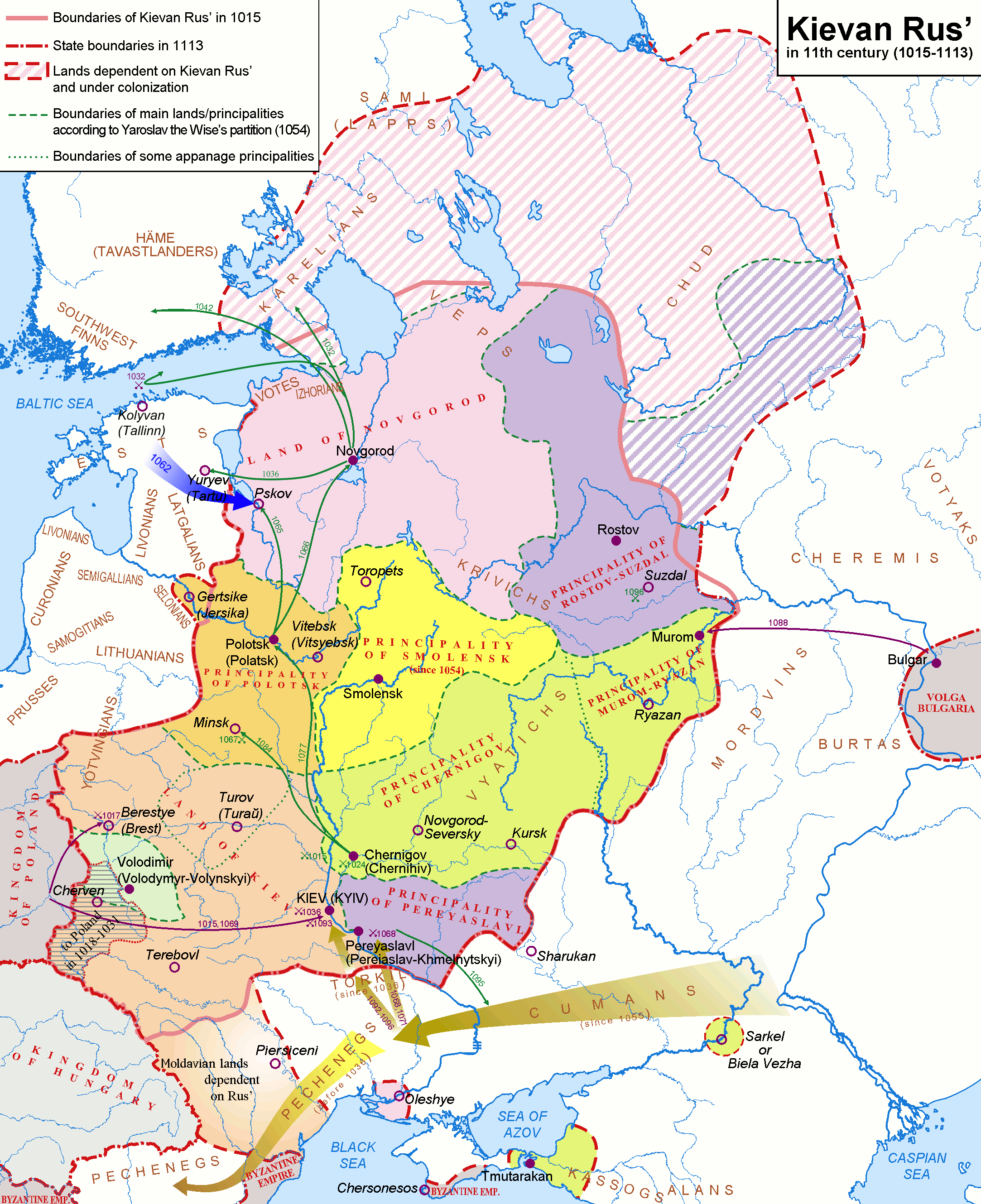
Kievan Rus 1030–1113. The lands of the Chud are approximated in the eastern portion of the northern frontier region.

Chud or Chude (Old East Slavic: чудь, romanized: čudǐ; Finnish: tšuudi; Northern Sami: čuhti) is a term historically applied in the early East Slavic annals to several Baltic Finnic peoples in the area of what is now Estonia, Karelia and Northwestern Russia. It has also been used to refer to other Finno-Ugric peoples.

== Etymology ==
There are a number of hypotheses as to the origin of the term. Chud could be derived from the Slavic word tjudjo ('foreign' or 'strange'). Another hypothesis is that the term was derived from a transformation of the Finno-Ugric name for the wood grouse. Yet another hypothesis contends that it is derived from the Sami word tshudde or čuđđe, meaning an enemy or adversary (Finnish: vainolainen). This would have required prominent Sami presence in trading centers around Lake Ladoga.

== Attestation in Slavonic sources ==
Arguably, the earliest attested written use of the word "Chuds" to describe Baltic Finnic peoples (presumably early Estonians) was c. 1100, in the earliest Rus' chronicles in the Old East Slavic language. According to the Primary Chronicle, the Chud lived along the "Varangian Sea" (Baltic Sea), next to the Lyakhs (Poles) and Old Prussians. It goes on to narrate that the Chud were among the founders of the Kievan Rus' state. along with Krivichs, Veps, Ilmen Slavs and Varangians. The invading troops of Yaroslav I the Wise are said to have defeated "Chuds" in a battle in 1030 and then established the fort of "Yuryev" (in what is now Tartu, Estonia).

In other Old East Slavic chronicles, the term "Chuds" refers to several Finnic tribes, early Estonian groups in particular. Kievan rulers then collected tribute from the Chuds of the surrounding ancient Estonian county of Ugaunia, possibly until 1061, when, according to the chronicles, Yuryev was burned down by an Estonian tribe called Sosols (probably Sackalians, Oeselians or Harionenses). Most of the raids against Chuds described in medieval East Slavic chronicles occur in present-day Estonia. The border lake between Estonia and the Russian Federation is still called Chudskoye (Chud Lake) in modern Russian. However, many ancient references to Chuds talk of peoples very far from Estonia, like Zavoloshka Chuds between Mordovians and Komis.

== Identity ==
Chuds have traditionally been believed to belong to the group of Baltic-Finnic peoples, though there have been some debate as to which specific group. After the first encounter with the Chuds, Slavic people tended to call other Finnic-speaking peoples Chuds, and thus became a collective name for the Finno-Ugric neighbours in Russian cultural tradition. Many writers contend that the Chuds were Vepsians, Fasmer posits them in Karelia while Smirnov suggests the Setos are descendants of the Chuds. In recent research on toponymy of the Luga and Volkhov river catchment areas Finnish fennougrist Pauli Rahkonen has come to the conclusion, that the language spoken in the area has been Finnic only in the vicinity of the southern coasts of Lake Ladoga and the Gulf of Finland, but more upstream of the two rivers, the language, as based on the evidence of hydronyms in the area, has represented other Finno-Ugric languages than Finnic. However, the Zavoloshka Chuds in the White Sea catchment area seem to have spoken Finnic languages based on the evidence of substrate toponymy in northern Russia carried out recently by Finnish Finno-Ugrist Janne Saarikivi.

== Chuds in folklore ==
In Russian folk legends, the Chuds were described as exalted and beautiful. One characteristic of the Chuds was 'white-eyed', which means lightly colored eyes.

Russian bylinas and bylichkas describe the disappearance of the Chud when the Slavs came to their territories. When there were very few Chud left, the last of their kind drowned themselves (or buried themselves) to avoid being captured or having contact with aliens.

In the chronicles which narrate about the founding of Russia, the Chuds are mentioned as one of the founder races, with the Slav and the Varyags (Varangians).

Folk etymology derives the word from Old East Slavic language (chuzhoi, 'foreign'; or chudnoi 'odd'; or chud 'weird'), or alternatively from chudnyi, wonderful, miraculous, excellent, attractive.

Chuds or Tchuds are traditional generic villains in some Sami legends, as well as in the Sami-language movie Pathfinder from 1987, which is loosely based on such legends.

== Use of term in historical times ==
Chuds and other ethnic groups in 9th century Eastern Europe

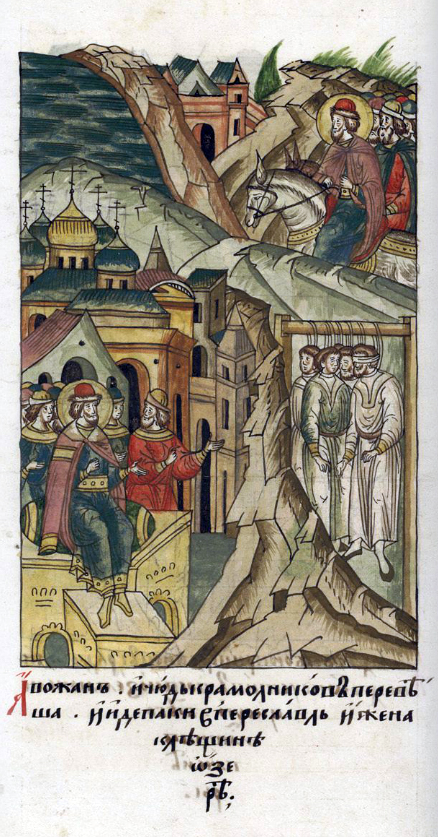
Execution of Vods and Chuds by Alexander Nevsky, 16th-century miniature depicting 13th-century events

Later, the word Chuds was more often used for more eastern Finnic peoples, Veps and Votes in particular, while some derivatives of chud like chukhna or chukhonets were applied to more western Finns and Estonians. Following the Russian conquests of Finland 1714–1809, and increasing contacts between Finns and Saint Petersburg, Finns perceived the word Chud to be disparaging and hinting at the serfdom that the Russians were believed to find fit for the Finns. However, as a disparaging word, it was rather chukhna that was applied also to Finns and Estonians as late as during the Winter War, 1939–1940, between the Soviet Union and Finland.

In present-day Russian vernacular, the word chukhna is often used to denote the Veps. The name Chuds (or Northern Chuds) has been used for Veps people also by some anthropologists.

In the mytho-poetical tradition of the Komi, the word chud can also designate Komi heroes and heathens; Old Believers; another people different from the Komi; or robbers—the latter two are the typical legends in Sámi folklore. In fact, the legends about Chuds (Čuđit) cover a large area in northern Europe from Scandinavia to the Urals, bounded by Lake Ladoga in the south, the northern and eastern districts of the Vologda province, and passing by the Kirov region, further into Komi-Permyak Okrug. It has from this area spread to Trans-Ural region through mediation of migrants from European North.

Chud has become a swear word in the Arkhangelsk region. As late as 1920, people of that region used legends of the Chuds to scare small naughty children.

== See also ==
- Gauja Estonians
- Chudovo

== Primary sources ==
- Izbornyk (1908). Лѣтопись По Ипатьевскому Списку [The Chronicle according to the Hypatian Codex]. Complete Collection of Russian Chronicles (PSRL). Volume 2. 3rd Edition. Col. 15. Saint Petersburg: Typography of Edward Prats.
- Cross, Samuel Hazzard; Sherbowitz-Wetzor, Olgerd P. (1953). The Russian Primary Chronicle, Laurentian Text. Translated and edited by Samuel Hazzard Cross and Olgerd P. Sherbowitz-Wetzor (PDF). Cambridge, Massachusetts: The Mediaeval Academy of America. p. 325. (First edition published in 1930. The first 50 pages are a scholarly introduction.)
  - Cross, Samuel Hazzard; Sherbowitz-Wetzor, Olgerd P. (2013) [1953]. SLA 218. Ukrainian Literature and Culture. Excerpts from The Rus' Primary Chronicle (Povest vremennykh let, PVL) (PDF). Toronto: Electronic Library of Ukrainian Literature, University of Toronto. p. 16. Archived from the original (PDF) on 30 May 2014.
