= Soopoolitse =

Ancient Estonian county

- county of Ancient Estonia
- 1224
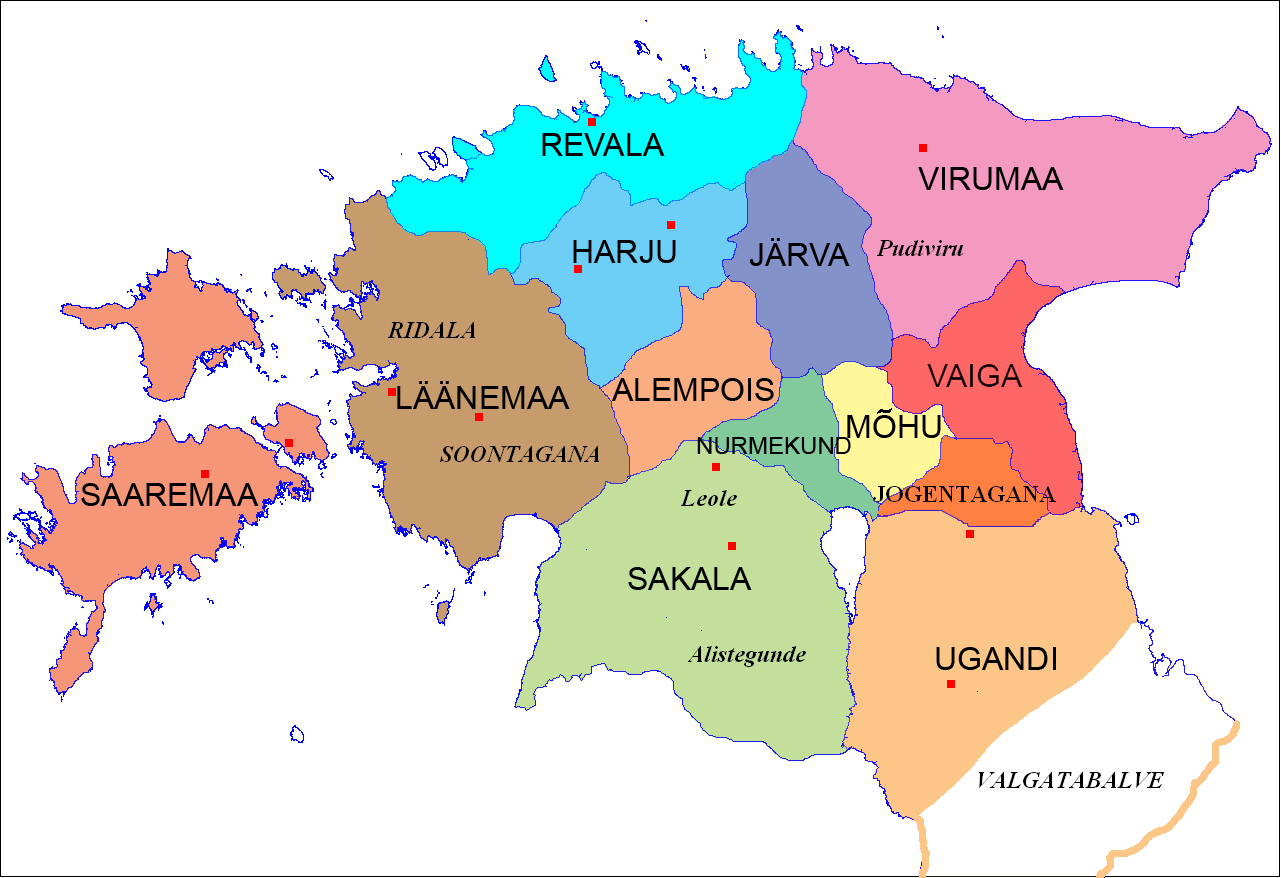
- Ancient Estonian counties
- Area
  - Coordinates: 58°36′36″N 27°06′48″E
Succeeded by
Monastic state of the Teutonic Knights

Soopoolitse was a small landlocked ancient Estonian county in the eastern part of the territory of Estonia.

== See also ==
- Livonian Crusade
