= Trikāta Parish =

Parish in Valmiera Municipality, Latvia

- parish of Latvia
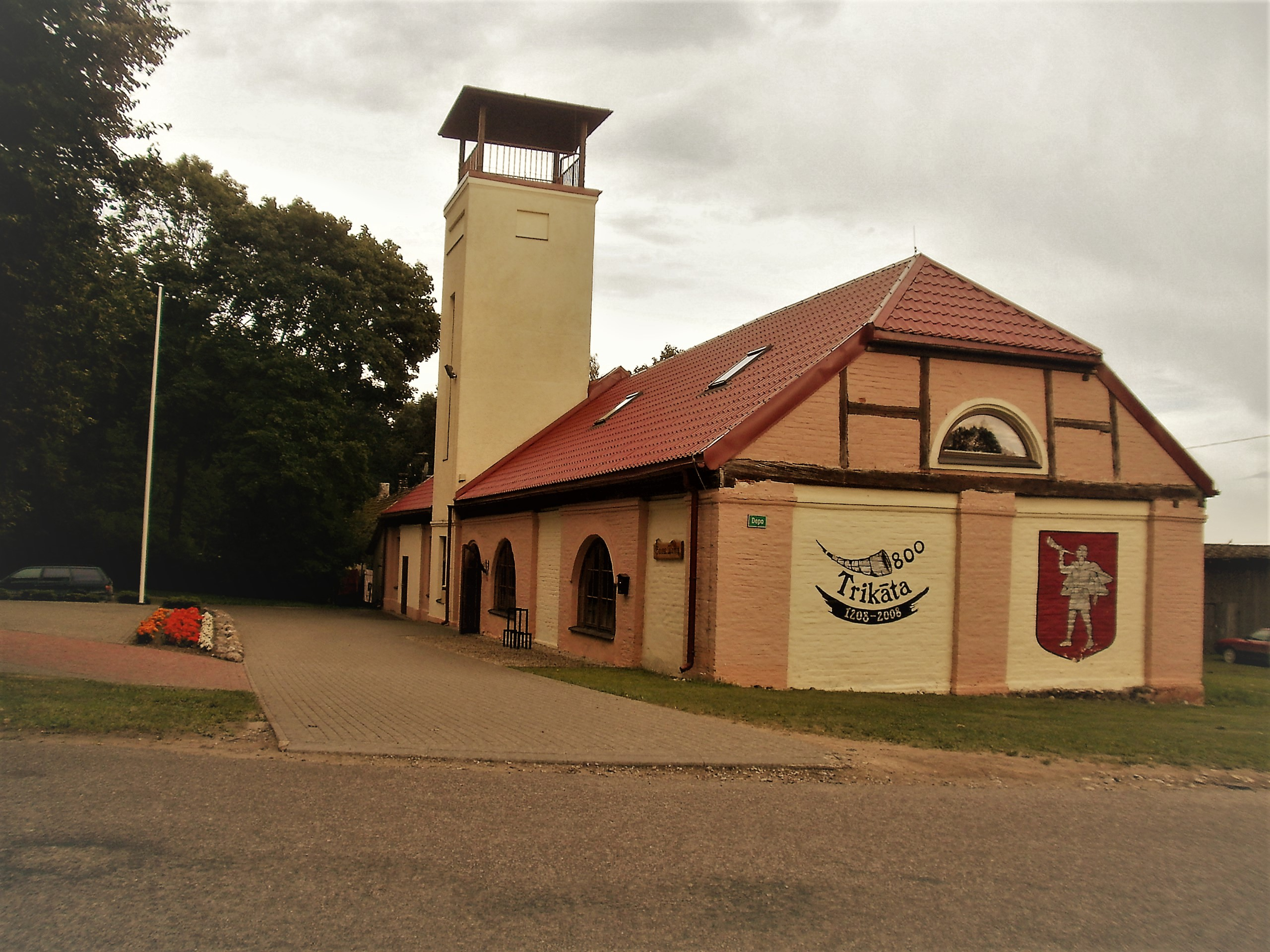

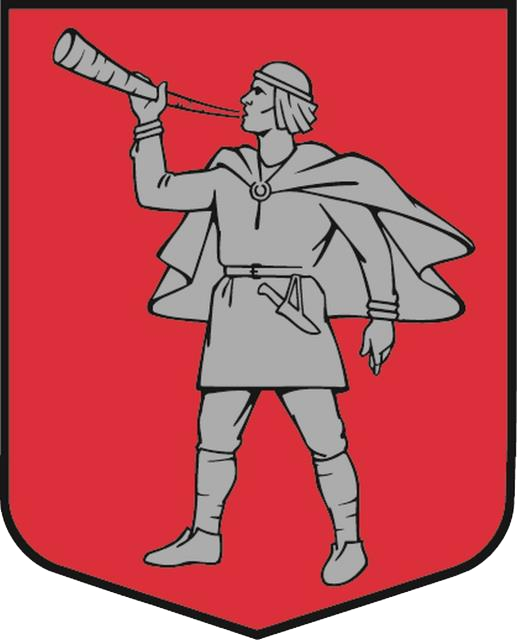
- Coat of arms

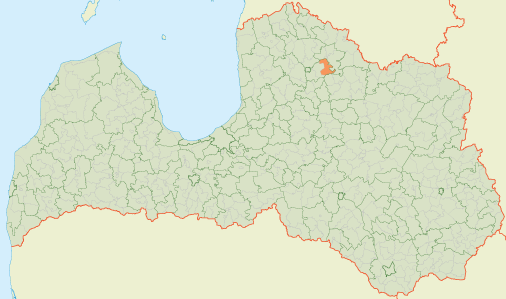
- 57°32′51″N 25°41′57″E
- Country: Latvia

Area
  - Total: 113.22 km^{2} (43.71 sq mi)
  - Land: 109.97 km^{2} (42.46 sq mi)
  - Water: 3.25 km^{2} (1.25 sq mi)

Population (1 January 2025)
  - Total: 829
  - Density: 7.54/km^{2} (19.5/sq mi)

Trikāta Parish (Latvian: Trikātas pagasts) is a constituent part of Valmiera Municipality, Latvia. From 2009 to 2021, Trikāta Parish was a part of the now-defunct Beverīna Municipality. Before the July 1, 2009, administrative reform it had been a part of Valka district and Valka county.

Latvian law defines Trikāta Parish as a part of the Vidzeme historical region.

Trikāta, the central settlement of the parish lies approximately 17 km to the east of Valmiera, 23 km north-west of Smiltene, and 14 km south of Strenči.

== Towns, villages of Trikāta Parish ==
- Trikāta - parish administrative center
- Dutka
- Ūdriņas
- Kačori
- Vāle
