= Sakala County =

Ancient county of Estonia

County of Sakala Sakala Maakond
- 11th century–1224
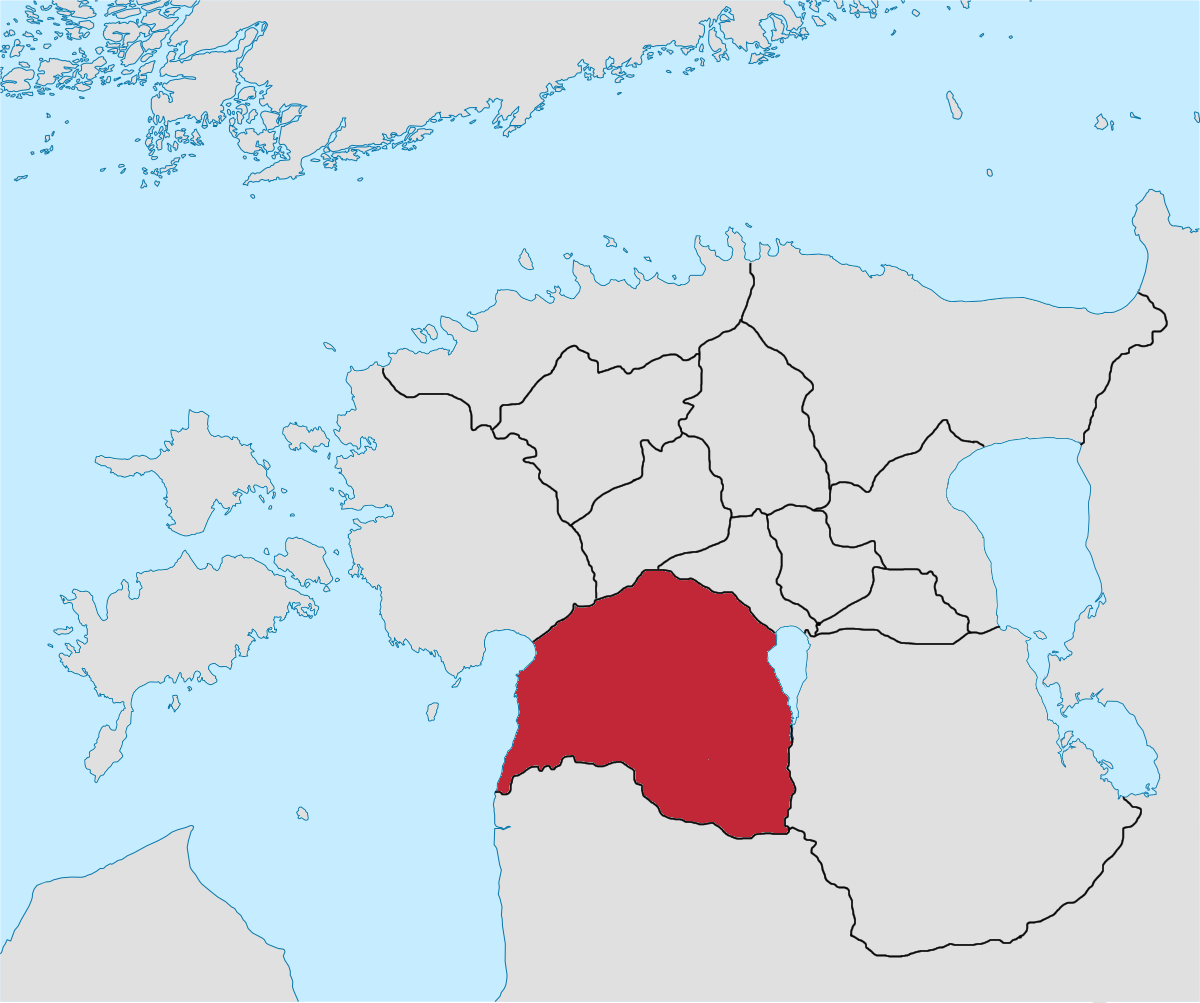
- Common languages: Estonian
- Government: County
- Elder
  - unknown-1217: Lembitu
- History
  - Established: 11th century
  - Disestablished: 1224

Sakala County (Estonian: Sakala, Latin: Saccalia) was an ancient Estonian county that was first mentioned in print by Henry of Latvia in the early 13th century.

== Geography ==
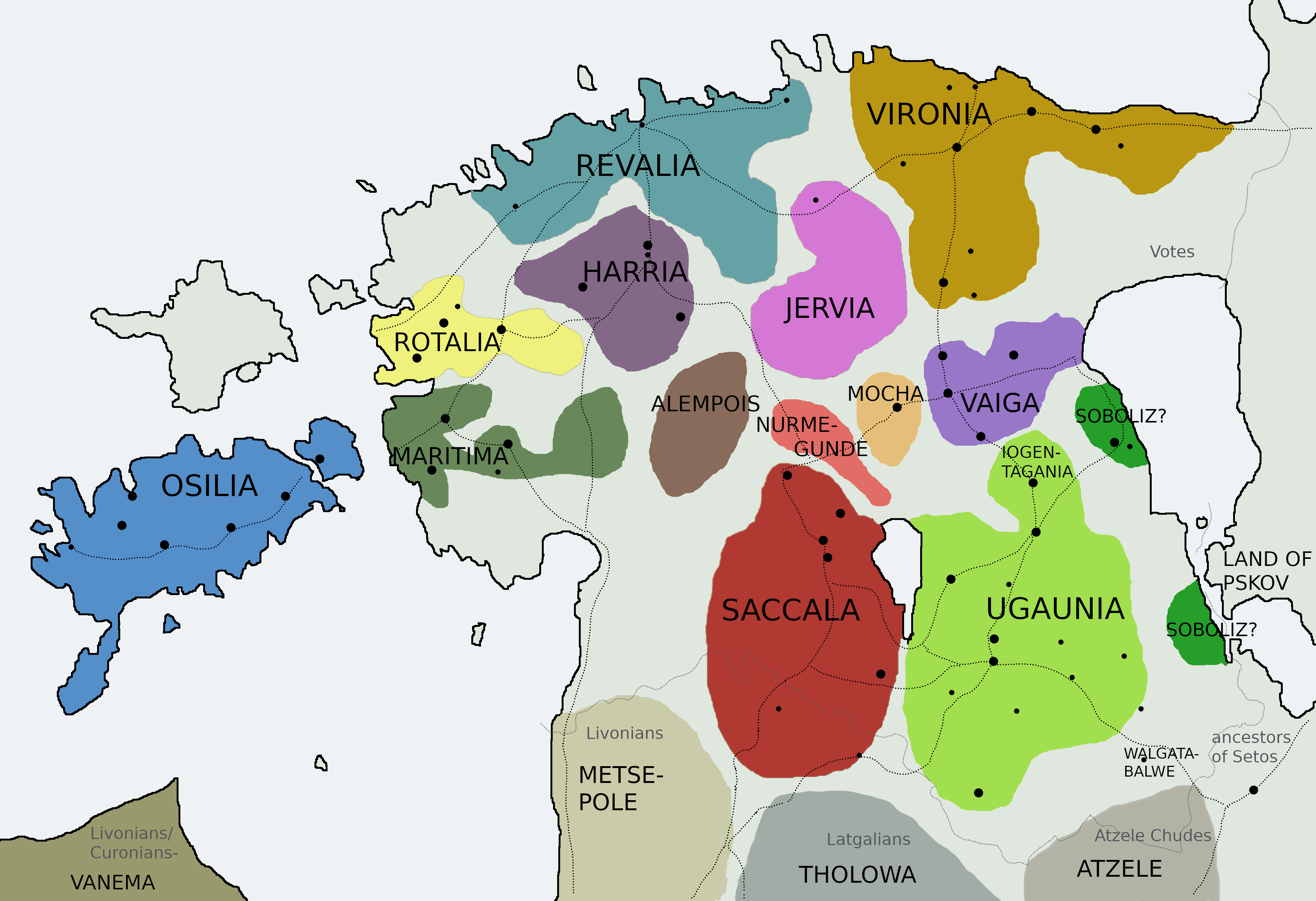
12th century map of the counties in Pre-Livonian Order Estonia

Sakala County is in northwestern Livonia, covering approximately the present counties of Viljandi, the southern half of Pärnu and the western third of Valga County. It was the southernmost of the ancient Estonian counties.

== History ==
According to one hypothesis, the tribe of Sosols mentioned in Old East Slavic chronicles implies the people of Sakala. The chronicles say that Kievan Rus organized military campaign against Sosols in 1060 and taxed them. A year later, Sosols rose, destroyed Kievan Rus Fort in Tartu and tried to attack Pskov.

After the Livonian Crusade, the county became a part of the Livonian Confederation.

In Sackalian folklore, the neighbouring Ugaunians (ugalased) were enemy warriors and robbers. For instance, a folk song from Viljandi, the capital of Sackalia, calls for speeding up the harvest work because the Ugaunians might attack.

== See also ==
- List of Estonian rulers
