= Estonia =

Country in Northern Europe

Republic of Estonia Eesti Vabariik
- Flag Coat of arms
- Anthem: Mu isamaa, mu õnn ja rõõm "My Fatherland, My Happiness and Joy"
- Location of Estonia (dark green) – in Europe (green & dark grey) – in the European Union (green) – [Legend]
- Capital and largest city: Tallinn; 59°25′N 24°45′E
- Official language: Estonian
- Ethnic groups (2026): 68.5% Estonians; 20.3% Russians; 5.5% Ukrainians; 5.3% other; 0.4% undeclared
- Religion (2021): 58.4% no religion; 26.7% Christianity; 16.3% Eastern Orthodoxy; 7.7% Lutheranism; 2.7% other Christian; 12.7% undeclared; 2.1% other
- Demonym: Estonian
- Government: Unitary parliamentary republic
  - President: Ülle Madise
  - Prime Minister: Kristen Michal
- Legislature: Riigikogu

Independence from Russian and German Empires
  - Declaration of Independence: 24 February 1918
  - German and Soviet occupations: 1940–1991 (Note: Estonia has been de facto independent in 1918–1940, and since 1991. Throughout foreign occupations in 1940–1991 the continuity of de jure independence was preserved by Estonian diplomats and government-in-exile.)
  - Restoration of Independence: 20 August 1991

Area
  - Total: 45,335 km^{2} (17,504 sq mi) (129th)
  - Water (%): 4.6

Population
  - 2026 estimate: ▲1,362,954 (153rd)
  - 2021 census: 1,331,824
  - Density: 30.3/km^{2} (78.5/sq mi) (148th)
- GDP (PPP): 2026 estimate
  - Total: ▲$70.711 billion (119th)
  - Per capita: ▲$51,653 (42nd)
- GDP (nominal): 2026 estimate
  - Total: ▲$51.634 billion (99th)
  - Per capita: ▲$37,718 (37th)
- Gini (2021): ▲30.6 medium inequality
- HDI (2023): ▲0.905 very high (36th)
- Currency: Euro (€) (EUR)
- Time zone: UTC+02:00 (EET)
  - Summer (DST): UTC+03:00 (EEST)
- Calling code: +372
- ISO 3166 code: EE
- Internet TLD: .ee

Estonia, (Note: /ɛsˈtoʊniə/ ess-TOH-nee-ə, Estonian: Eesti [ˈeˑstʲi]) officially the Republic of Estonia, (Note: Estonian: Eesti Vabariik, lit. 'Free state of Estonia') is a country in the Baltic region of Northern Europe. (Note: Located in Northern Europe, Estonia has also been classified as Eastern or Central Europe in some contexts. Various sources classify Estonia differently for statistical and other purposes. For example, the UN, and Eurovoc classify Estonia as part of Northern Europe, the OECD classifies it as a Central and Eastern European country, the CIA World Factbook classifies it as Eastern Europe. Usage varies greatly in press sources.) It is bordered to the north by the Gulf of Finland across from Finland, to the west by the Baltic Sea across from Sweden, to the south by Latvia, and to the east by Russia. The territory of Estonia consists of the mainland, the larger islands of Saaremaa and Hiiumaa, and over 2,300 other islands and islets on the east coast of the Baltic Sea. Its capital city of Tallinn, along with the city of Tartu, are the country's two largest urban areas. The Estonian language, of the Finnic family, is the official language and the first language of the majority of nearly 1.4 million people. Estonia is one of the least populous member states of the European Union.

Present-day Estonia has been inhabited since at least 9,000 BC. The medieval indigenous population of Estonia was one of the last pagan civilisations in Europe to adopt Christianity following the Northern Crusades in the 13th century. After centuries of foreign rule by the Teutonic Order, Denmark, Poland, Sweden, and the Russian Empire, a distinct Estonian national identity gained new momentum with the Age of Awakening in the mid-19th century. This culminated in the 1918 Estonian Declaration of Independence. Democratic throughout most of the interwar period, Estonia declared neutrality at the outbreak of World War II, but the country was repeatedly invaded and occupied, and ultimately annexed into the USSR. Throughout the de facto Soviet occupation, from World War II until 1991, Estonia's de jure state continuity was preserved by diplomatic representatives and the government-in-exile. Following the 1988–1990 "Singing Revolution" against Soviet rule, full independence was restored on 20 August 1991, and the country joined NATO and the European Union in 2004.

Estonia is a developed country with a high-income, advanced economy, and Eurozone membership. It is a democratic unitary parliamentary republic, with a single-tier local government system consisting of 79 municipalities. Estonia is among the least corrupt countries in the world and ranks very high in international rankings for education, human development, press freedom, online public services, and the prevalence of technology companies.

== Name ==
The name Estonia (Estonian: Eesti [ˈeˑstʲi]) has been connected to the Aesti, a people first mentioned by Roman historian Tacitus around AD 98. Some historians believe he was referring to the Balts, while others think the name applied to all inhabitants of the eastern Baltic Sea region. Scandinavian sagas and Viking runestones referring to Eistland are the earliest sources known to use the name in its modern geographic meaning.

== History ==
=== Prehistory ===
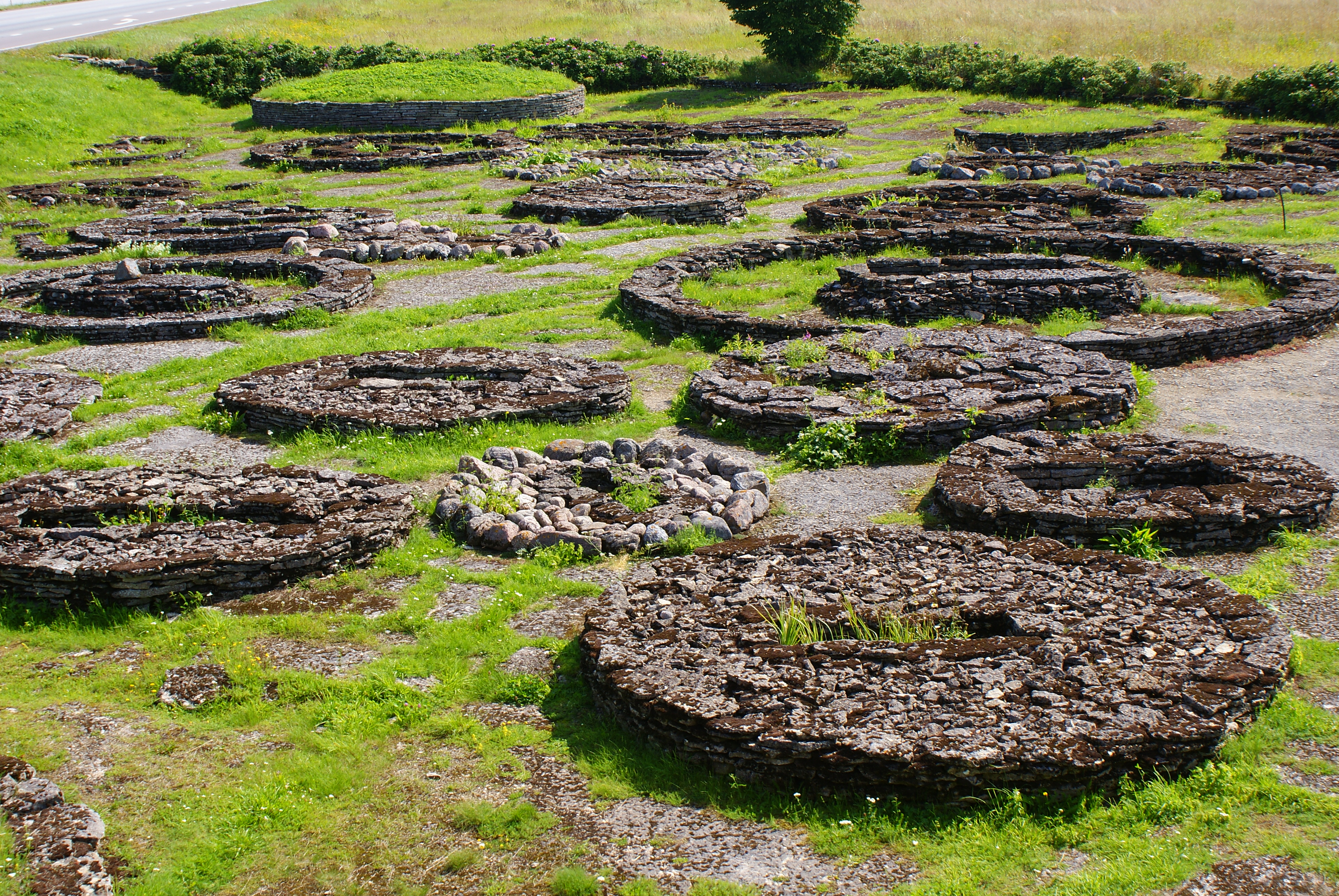
Bronze Age stone-cist graves at Jõelähtme

The oldest known settlement in Estonia is the Pulli settlement on the banks of Pärnu that dates to the early 9th millennium BC, making it at least 11,000 years old.

The earliest human habitation during the Mesolithic period is connected to the Kunda culture. Around 5300 BCE, ceramics appear of the neolithic period, known as Narva culture. The Comb Ceramic culture emerged around 3900 BC, bringing traces of early agriculture and sophisticated religious art. Starting from around 2800 BC the Corded Ware culture appeared; this included new activities like primitive farming and animal husbandry.

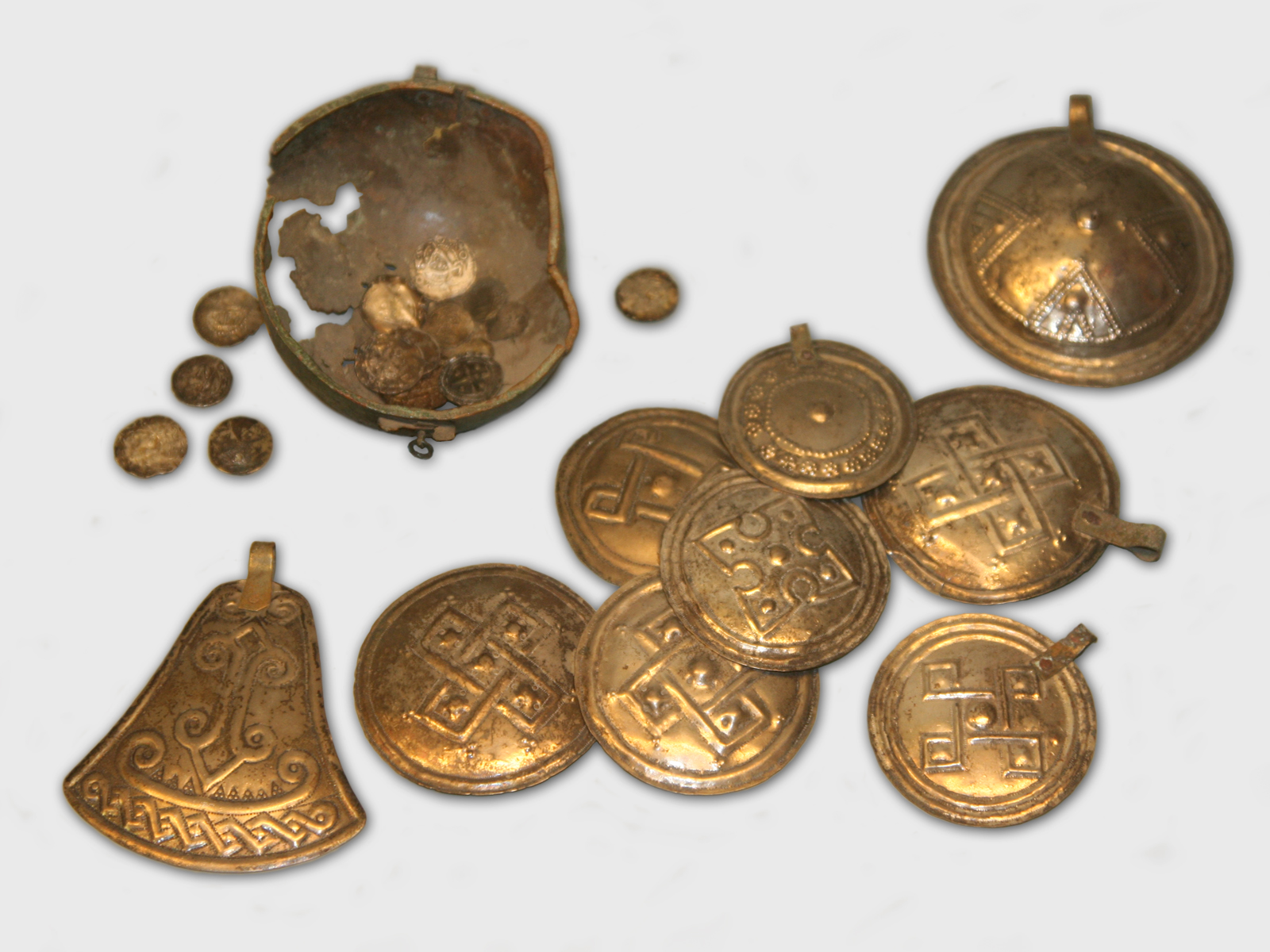
Iron Age artefacts of a hoard from Kumna

The Bronze Age started around 1800 BCE, and saw the establishment of the first hill fort settlements. A transition from hunter-fisher subsistence to single-farm-based settlement started around 1000 BC, and was complete by the beginning of the Iron Age around 500 BC. The large amount of bronze objects indicate the existence of active communication with Scandinavian and Germanic tribes.

=== Viking Age ===
The middle Iron Age produced threats appearing from different directions. Several Scandinavian sagas referred to major confrontations with Estonians, notably when in the early 7th century "Estonian Vikings" defeated and killed Ingvar Harra, the King of Swedes. Similar threats appeared to the east, where East Slavic principalities were expanding westward. In c. 1030, Grand Prince Yaroslav the Wise of Kievan Rus' attempted to subjugate the Chuds(as East Slavic sources called Estonians and related Finnic tribes) in southeast Estonia and captured Tartu. Chuds (Sosols) destroyed this foothold in 1061. Around the 11th century, the Scandinavian Viking era around the Baltic Sea was succeeded by the Baltic Viking era, with seaborne raids by Curonians and by Estonians from the island of Saaremaa, known as Oeselians. In 1187 Estonians (Oeselians), Curonians or/and Karelians sacked Sigtuna, which was a major city of Sweden at the time.

Estonia could be divided into two main cultural areas. The coastal areas of north and west Estonia had close overseas contacts with Scandinavia and Finland, while inland south Estonia had more contacts with Balts and Pskov. The landscape of Ancient Estonia featured numerous hillforts. Prehistoric or medieval harbour sites have been found on the coast of Saaremaa. Estonia also has a number of graves from the Viking Age, both individual and collective, with weapons and jewellery including types found commonly throughout Northern Europe and Scandinavia.

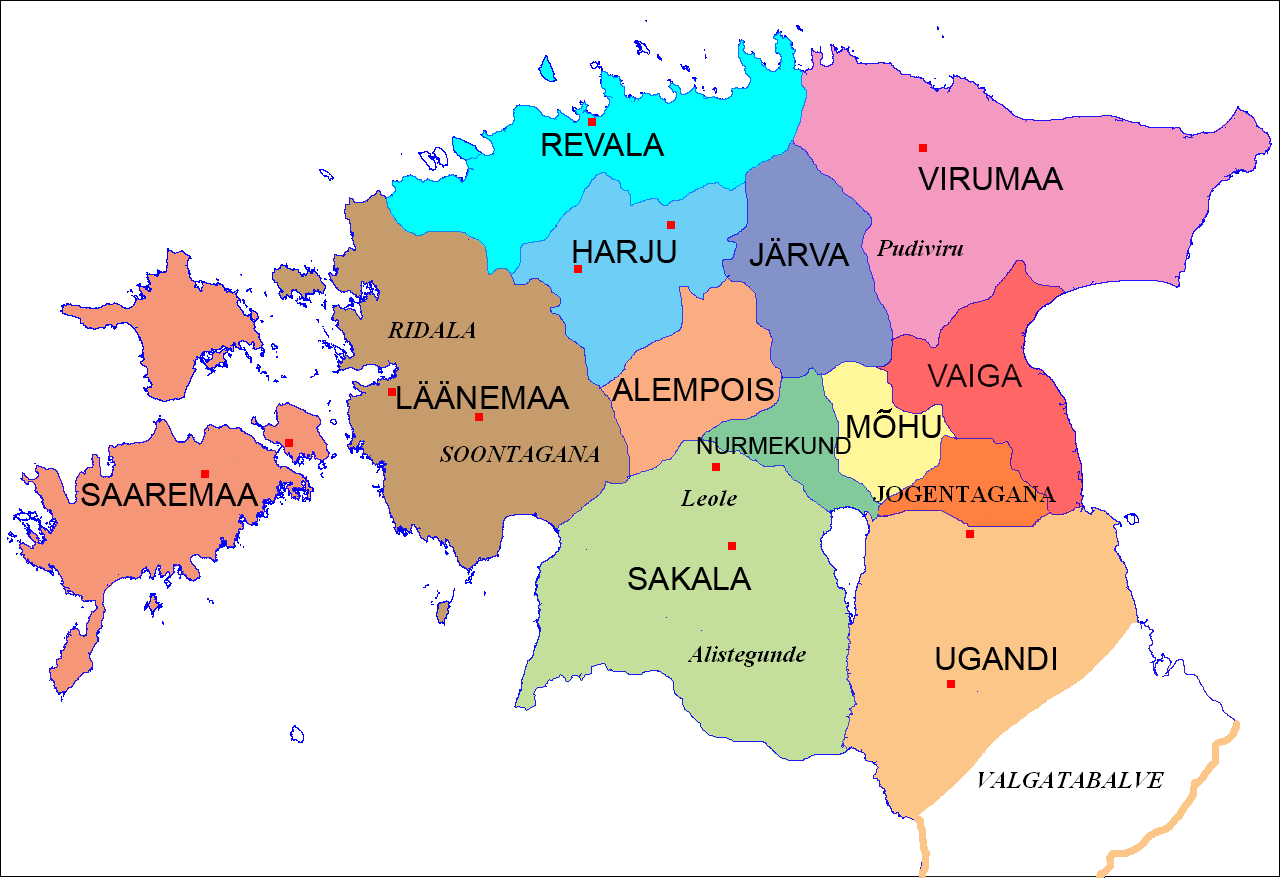
Pre-Christian independent Estonian counties (maakond), c. 1200

In the early centuries AD, administrative subdivisions began to emerge in Estonia. Two larger subdivisions appeared: the parish (Estonian: kihelkond) and the county (Estonian: maakond), which consisted of multiple parishes. A parish was led by elders and centered on a hill fort; in some rare cases a parish had multiple forts. By the 13th century, Estonia comprised eight bigger counties: Harjumaa, Järvamaa, Läänemaa, Revala, Saaremaa, Sakala, Ugandi, and Virumaa; and six minor smaller, single-parish counties: Alempois, Jogentagana, Mõhu, Nurmekund, Soopoolitse, and Vaiga. Counties were independent entities and engaged only in a loose cooperation against foreign threats.

Medieval Estonians' spiritual and religious practices before Christianization were often noted for their animistic beliefs. There is historical evidence about sacred groves, especially groves of oak trees, having served as places of "pagan" worship.

=== Crusades and the Catholic Era ===
Medieval Estonia and Livonia after the crusade

In 1199, Pope Innocent III declared a crusade to "defend the Christians of Livonia". Fighting reached Estonia in 1206, when Danish King Valdemar II unsuccessfully invaded Saaremaa. The German Livonian Brothers of the Sword, who had previously subjugated Livonians, Latgalians, and Selonians, started campaigning against the Estonians in 1208, and over the next few years both sides made numerous raids and counter-raids. A major leader of the Estonian resistance was Lembitu, an elder of Sakala County, but in 1217 the Estonians suffered a significant defeat in the Battle of St. Matthew's Day, where Lembitu was killed. In 1219, Valdemar II landed at Lindanise, defeated the Estonians in the Battle of Lyndanisse, and started conquering Northern Estonia. The next year, Sweden invaded Western Estonia, but were repelled by the Oeselians. In 1223, a major revolt ejected the Germans and Danes from the whole of Estonia, except Reval, but the crusaders soon resumed their offensive, and in 1227, Saaremaa was the last maakond (county) to surrender.

After the crusade, the territory of present-day south Estonia and Latvia was named Terra Mariana; later on it became known simply as Livonia. Northern Estonia became the Danish Duchy of Estonia, while the rest was divided between the Sword Brothers and prince-bishoprics of Dorpat and Ösel–Wiek. In 1236, after suffering a major defeat, the Sword Brothers merged into the Teutonic Order becoming the Livonian Order. In the next decades there were several uprisings against the Teutonic rulers in Saaremaa. In 1343, a major uprising encompassed north Estonia and Saaremaa. The Teutonic Order suppressed the rebellion by 1345, and in 1346 the Danish king sold his possessions in Estonia to the Order. The unsuccessful rebellion led to a consolidation of power for the upper-class German minority. For the subsequent centuries Low German remained the language of the ruling elite in both Estonian cities and the countryside.

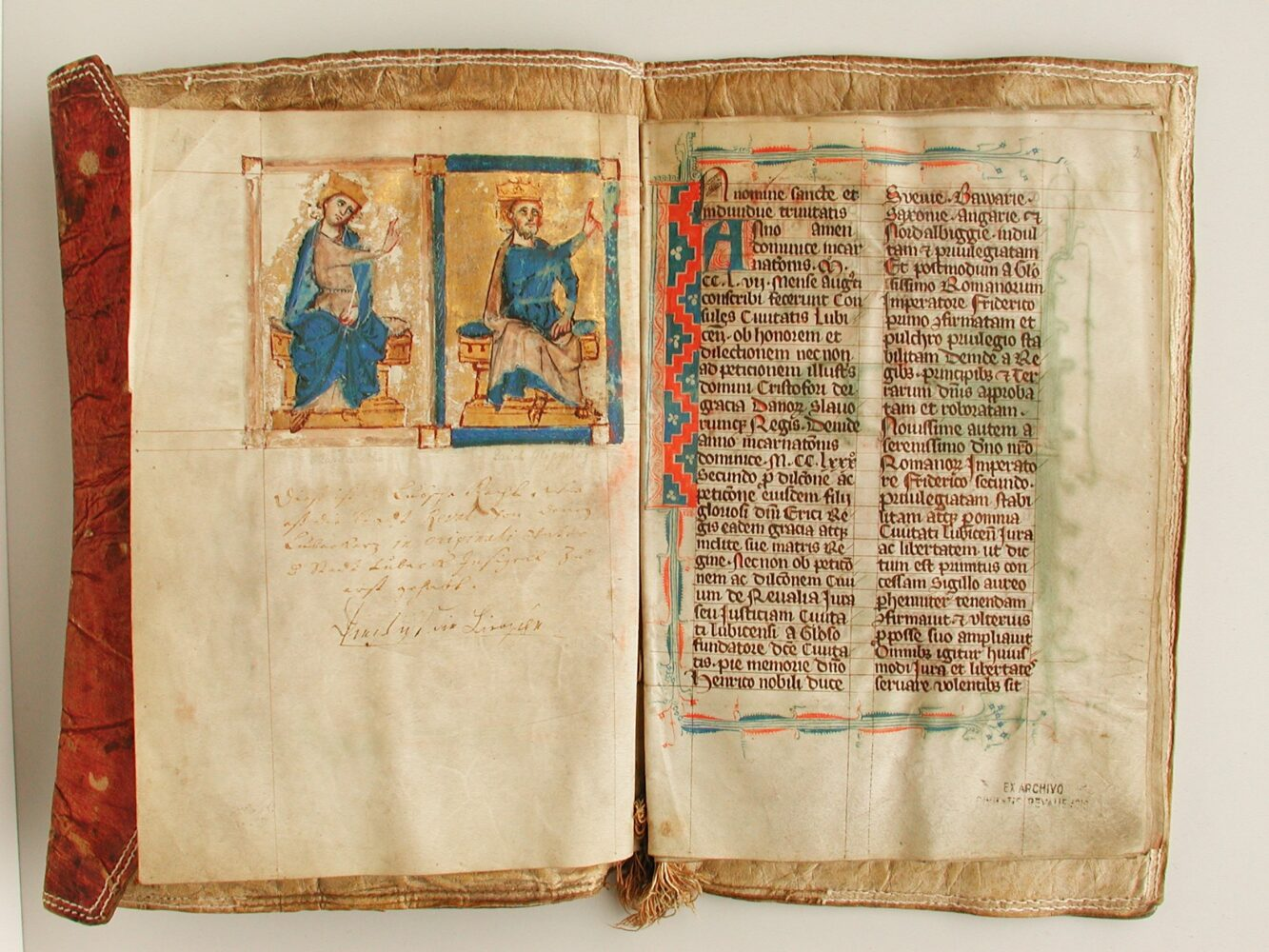
Lübeck Law Codex for Tallinn

Reval (Tallinn), the capital of Danish Estonia founded on the site of Lindanise, adopted the Lübeck law and received full town rights in 1248. The Hanseatic League controlled trade on the Baltic Sea, and overall the four largest towns in Estonia became members: Reval, Dorpat (Tartu), Pernau (Pärnu), and Fellin (Viljandi). Reval acted as a trade intermediary between Novgorod and western Hanseatic cities, while Dorpat filled the same role with Pskov. Many artisans' and merchants guilds were formed during the period. Protected by their stone walls and membership in the Hansa, prosperous cities like Reval and Dorpat often defied other rulers of the medieval Livonian Confederation. (Note: After the decline of the Teutonic Order following its defeat in the Battle of Grunwald in 1410, and the defeat of the Livonian Order in the Battle of Swienta on 1 September 1435, the Livonian Confederation was established by a treaty signed on 4 December 1435.)

=== Post-Reformation Era ===
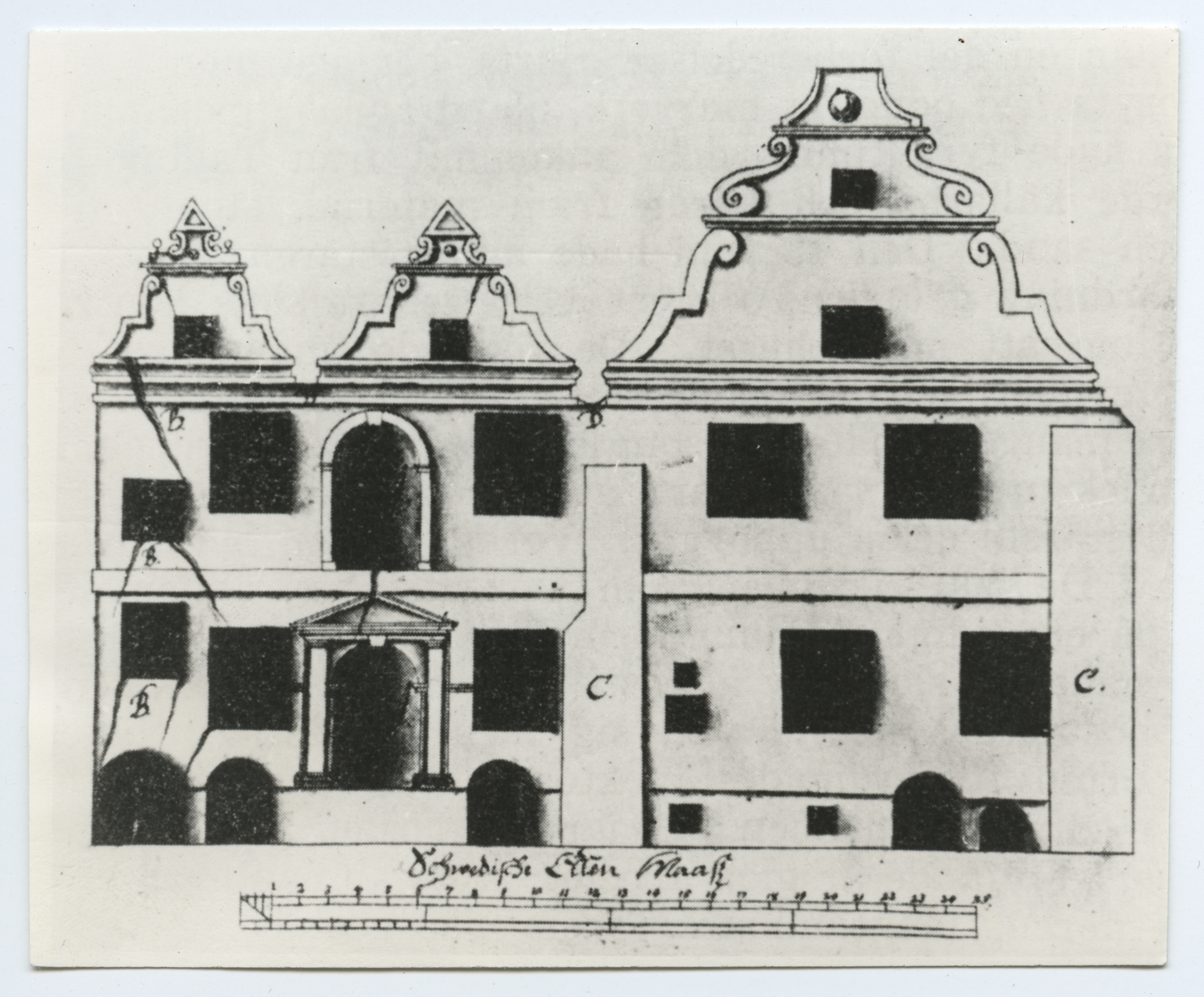
Academia Gustaviana (now University of Tartu) was founded in 1632 by King Gustaf II Adolf and was then the second university in the entire Kingdom of Sweden.

The Reformation began in central Europe in 1517, and soon spread northward to Livonia despite some opposition by the Livonian Order. Towns were the first to embrace Protestantism in the 1520s, and by the 1530s the majority of the landowners and rural population had adopted Lutheranism. Church services were now conducted in vernacular language, which initially meant Low German, but already from the 1530s onward the regular religious services were held in Estonian.

During the 16th century, the expansionist monarchies of Muscovy, Sweden, and Poland–Lithuania consolidated power, posing a growing threat to decentralised Livonia weakened by disputes between cities, nobility, bishops, and the Order.

In 1558, Tsar Ivan the Terrible of Russia (Muscovy) invaded Livonia, starting the Livonian War. The Livonian Order was decisively defeated in 1560. The majority of Livonia accepted Polish rule, while Reval and the nobles of northern Estonia swore loyalty to the Swedish king, and the Bishop of Ösel-Wiek sold his lands to the Danish king. Tsar Ivan's forces were at first able to conquer the larger part of Livonia, however in the 1570s the Polish-Lithuanian and Swedish armies went on the offensive and the war ended in 1583 with Russian defeat. As a result of the war, northern Estonia became the Swedish Duchy of Estonia, southern Estonia became the Polish Duchy of Livonia, and Saaremaa remained under Danish control.

In 1600, the Polish–Swedish War broke out, causing further devastation. The protracted war ended in 1629 with Sweden gaining Livonia, including the regions of Southern Estonia and Northern Latvia. Danish Saaremaa was transferred to Sweden in 1645. The wars had halved the population of Estonia from about 250–270,000 people in the mid 16th century to 115–120,000 in the 1630s. While large parts of the rural population remained in serfdom during the Swedish rule, legal reforms strengthened both serfs' and free tenant farmers' land usage and inheritance rights – hence this period got the reputation of "The Good Old Swedish Time" in historical memory. Swedish King Gustaf II Adolf established gymnasiums in Reval and Dorpat; the latter was upgraded to Tartu University in 1632. Printing presses were also established in both towns. The beginnings of the Estonian public education system appeared in the 1680s, largely due to efforts of Bengt Forselius, who also introduced orthographical reforms to written Estonian. The population of Estonia grew rapidly until the Great Famine of 1695–97 in which 70,000–75,000 people died – about 20% of the population.

During the 1700–1721 Great Northern War, the Tsardom of Russia (Muscovy) conquered the whole of Estonia by 1710. The war again devastated the population of Estonia, with the 1712 population estimated at only 150,000–170,000. In 1721, Estonia was divided into two governorates: the Governorate of Estonia, which included Tallinn and the northern part of Estonia, and the southern Governorate of Livonia, which extended to the northern part of Latvia. The tsarist administration restored all the political and landholding rights of the local aristocracy. The rights of local farmers reached their lowest point, as serfdom completely dominated agricultural relations during the 18th century. Serfdom was formally abolished in 1816–1819, but this initially had very little practical effect; major improvements in farmers' rights started with reforms in the mid-19th century.

The reopening of the university in Tartu in 1802 gave opportunities for higher education to both Baltic German and a growing number of Estonian students. Among the latter were first public proponents of Estonian nationalism, such as young poet Kristjan Jaak Peterson. At the same time, the nationalist ideas of Johann Gottfried Herder greatly influenced the Baltic German intelligentsia to see the value in the native Estonian culture. The resulting Estophile movement gave rise to the Learned Estonian Society and other scientific societies, supported Estonian-language education and founded the first newspapers in the Estonian language. They also began to value and collect Estonian folklore, including surviving pre-Christian myths and traditions. Another sign of a rising Estonian national consciousness was a mass movement in South Estonia to convert to Eastern Orthodoxy in the 1840s, following a famine and a promise for being rewarded with land.

=== National Awakening ===
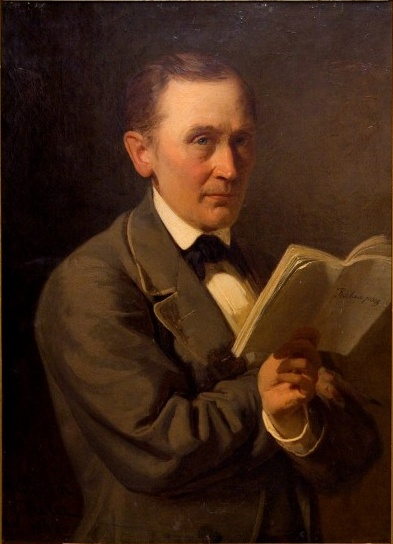
Friedrich Reinhold Kreutzwald, author of the Estonian national epic Kalevipoeg, (by Johann Köler, 1864)

By the 1850s, several leading figures were promoting an Estonian national identity among the general populace. Widespread farm buyouts by Estonians and the resulting rapidly growing class of land-owning farmers provided the economic basis for the political affirmation of the Estonian identity. In 1857, Johann Voldemar Jannsen started publishing one of the first successful circulating Estonian-language weekly newspapers, Perno Postimees, and began popularising the denomination of oneself as eestlane (Estonian). Schoolmaster Carl Robert Jakobson and clergyman Jakob Hurt became leading figures in a nationalist movement, encouraging Estonian farmers to take pride in their language and ethnic Estonian identity.

The first nationwide movements formed in the 1860s, such as a campaign to establish the Estonian language Alexander School, the founding of the Society of Estonian Literati and the Estonian Students' Society, and the first national song festival, held in 1869 in Tartu. Linguistic reforms helped to develop the Estonian language. The national epic Kalevipoeg was published in 1857, and 1870 saw the first performances of Estonian theatre. In 1878 a major split happened in the national movement. The moderate wing led by Hurt focused on development of culture and Estonian education, while the radical wing led by Jakobson started demanding increased political and economical rights.

In the 1890s, the central government of the Russian Empire launched a Russification campaign in order to tie the Baltic governorates more closely to the empire administratively and culturally. Russian language replaced German and Estonian in most secondary schools and universities, and many societal activities in local languages were suppressed. In the late 1890s, prominent figures like Jaan Tõnisson and Konstantin Päts rose in a new surge of nationalism. By the early 20th century, Estonians started taking over their German-run town governments. During the 1905 Revolution, the first legal Estonian political parties were founded. An Estonian national congress was convened and demanded the unification of Estonian areas into a single autonomous territory and an end to Russification. The unrest was accompanied by both peaceful demonstrations and violent riots. The Tsarist government responded with a brutal crackdown; some 500 people were executed and hundreds more jailed or deported to Siberia.

In 1917, following the collapse of the Russian Empire, the Russian Provisional Government yielded to popular demand and the two main Estonian-speaking governorates were merged into one Autonomous Governorate of Estonia, and the Estonian Provincial Assembly was then elected. Bolsheviks seized power in Estonia in November 1917, and disbanded the Provincial Assembly. However, the Provincial Assembly established the Salvation Committee, and during the short interlude between Russian retreat and German arrival, the committee declared the independence of Estonia on 24 February 1918, and formed the Estonian Provisional Government. German occupation immediately followed, but after Germany's capitulation in World War I, they were forced to return power to the Estonian government on 19 November 1918.

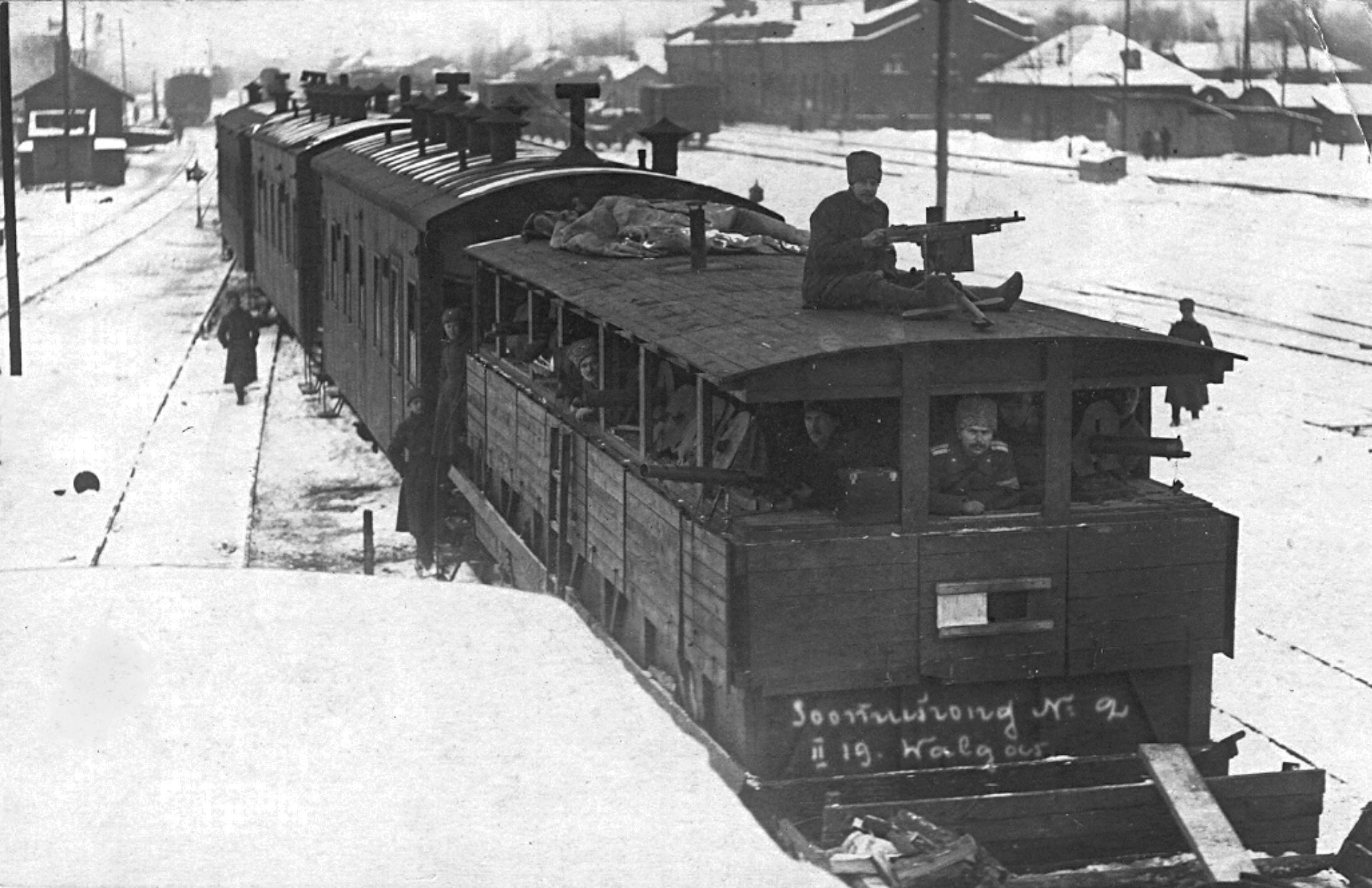
Estonian armoured train during the war of independence

On 28 November 1918 Soviet Russia invaded, starting the Estonian War of Independence. The Red Army came within 30 km of Tallinn, but in January 1919, the Estonian Army, led by Johan Laidoner, went on a counter-offensive, ejecting Bolshevik forces from Estonia within a few months. Renewed Soviet attacks failed, and in spring, the Estonian army, in co-operation with White Russian forces, advanced into Russia and Latvia. In June 1919, Estonia defeated the German Landeswehr which had attempted to dominate Latvia. The Red Army launched a final offensive against Narva in late 1919, but failed to achieve a breakthrough. On 2 February 1920, the Tartu Peace Treaty was signed by Estonia and Soviet Russia, with the latter pledging to permanently give up all sovereign claims to Estonia.

In April 1919, the Estonian Constituent Assembly was elected. They passed a sweeping land reform and adopted a highly liberal constitution, establishing Estonia as a parliamentary democracy. Estonia joined the League of Nations in 1921. Estonia enjoyed rapid economic growth during the interwar period. Land reforms improved the farmers' conditions, but the country also prospered from industrialisation and the development of oil shale mining. With independence, most economic links with Russia dissolved, but trade rapidly reoriented towards Western markets. Estonia's cultural-autonomy law for ethnic minorities, adopted in 1925, was one of the most liberal of its time.

The Great Depression strained Estonia's political system, and in 1933 the right-wing Vaps movement spearheaded a constitutional reform establishing a strong presidency. On 12 March 1934 the acting head of state, Konstantin Päts, extended a state of emergency over the entire country, under the pretext that the Vaps movement had been planning a coup. Päts ruled by decree for several years while parliament did not reconvene ("era of silence"). The Päts régime was relatively benign compared to other authoritarian régimes in interwar Europe, never using violence against political opponents. A 1937 referendum adopted a new constitution. In 1938, an election including opposition candidates provided a new bicameral parliament. Estonia signed non-aggression pacts with the Soviet Union in 1932, and with Germany in 1939. In 1939, Estonia declared neutrality, but this proved futile in World War II.

=== Independence ===
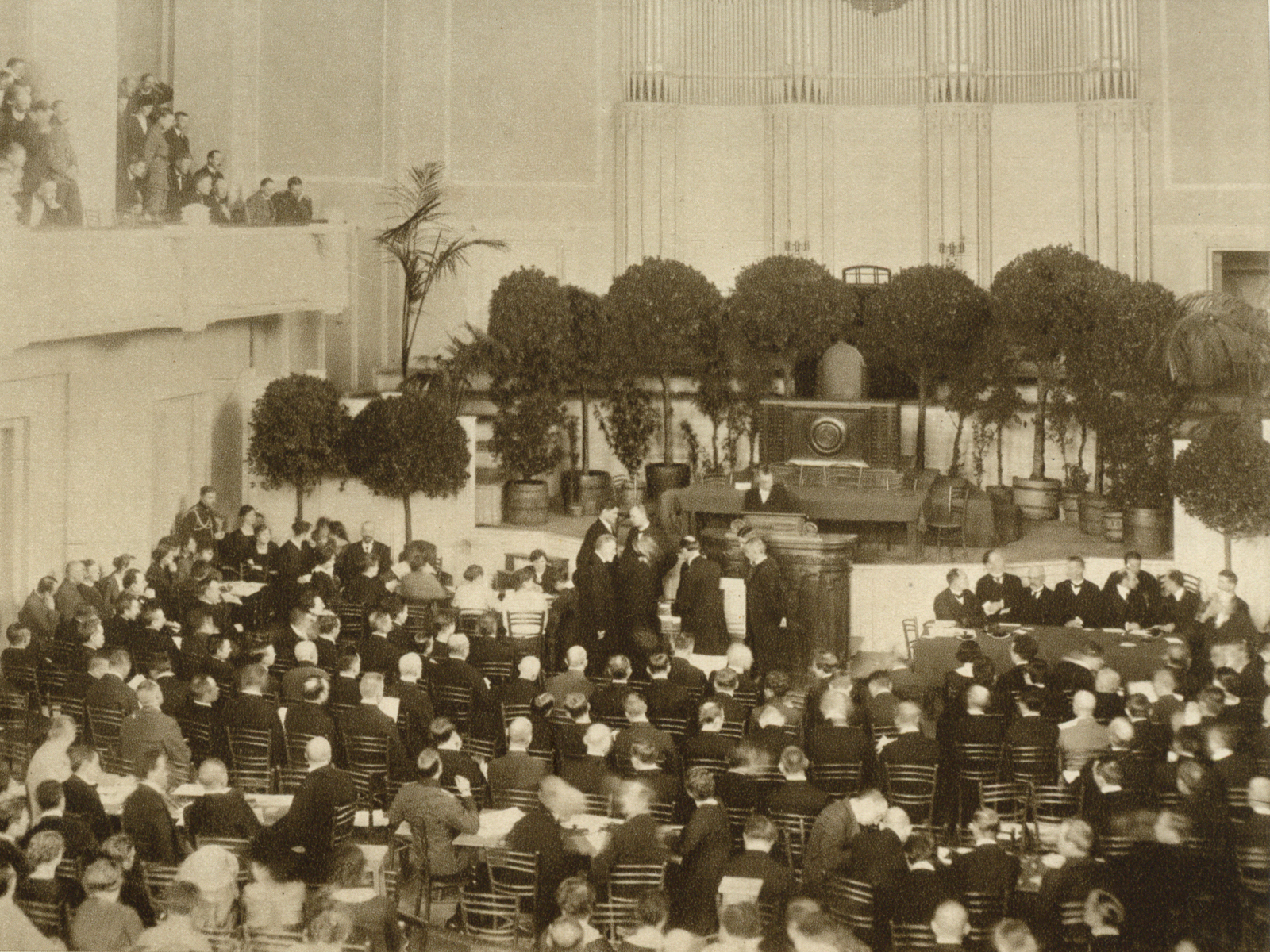
Estonian Constituent Assembly, opening session on 23 April 1919

In 1917, after the February Revolution, the governorate of Estonia was expanded by the Russian Provisional Government to include Estonian-speaking areas of Livonia and was granted autonomy, enabling the election of the Estonian Provincial Assembly. The Bolsheviks seized power in Estonia in November 1917, and the Provincial Assembly was disbanded. However, the Provincial Assembly established the Salvation Committee, and during the short interlude between Bolshevik retreat and German arrival, the committee declared independence and formed the Estonian Provisional Government on 24 February 1918 in the capital Tallinn. German occupation immediately followed, but after their defeat in World War I, the Germans were forced to hand over power back to the Provisional Government of independent Estonia on 19 November 1918.

On 28 November 1918, Soviet Russia invaded, starting the Estonian War of Independence. The Red Army came within 30 km of Tallinn, but in January 1919, the Estonian Army, led by Johan Laidoner, went on a counter-offensive, ejecting Bolshevik forces from Estonia within a few weeks. Renewed Soviet attacks failed, and in the spring of 1919, the Estonian army, in co-operation with White Russian forces, advanced into Russia and Latvia. In June 1919, Estonia defeated the German Landeswehr which had attempted to dominate Latvia, restoring power to the government of Kārlis Ulmanis there. After the collapse of the White Russian forces, the Red Army launched a major offensive against Narva in late 1919, but failed to achieve a breakthrough. On 2 February 1920, the Tartu Peace Treaty was signed by Estonia and Soviet Russia, with the latter pledging to permanently give up all sovereign claims to Estonia.

In April 1919, the Estonian Constituent Assembly was elected. The Constituent Assembly passed a sweeping land reform expropriating large estates, and adopted a new highly liberal constitution establishing Estonia as a parliamentary democracy. In 1924, the Soviet Union organised a communist coup attempt, which quickly failed. Estonia's cultural-autonomy law for ethnic minorities, adopted in 1925, is widely recognised as one of the most liberal in the world at that time. The Great Depression put heavy pressure on Estonia's political system, and in 1933, the right-wing Vaps movement spearheaded a constitutional reform establishing a strong presidency. On 12 March 1934 the acting head of state, Konstantin Päts, extended a state of emergency over the entire country, under the pretext that the Vaps movement had been planning a coup. Päts went on to rule by decree for several years, while the parliament did not reconvene ("era of silence"). A new constitution was adopted in a 1937 referendum, and in 1938 a new bicameral parliament was elected in a popular vote, where both pro-government and opposition candidates participated. The Päts régime was relatively benign compared to other authoritarian régimes in interwar Europe, and the régime never used violence against political opponents.

Estonia joined the League of Nations in 1921. Attempts to establish a larger alliance together with Finland, Poland, and Latvia failed, with only a mutual-defence pact being signed with Latvia in 1923, and later was followed up with the Baltic Entente of 1934. In the 1930s, Estonia also engaged in secret military co-operation with Finland. Non-aggression pacts were signed with the Soviet Union in 1932, and with Germany in 1939. In 1939, Estonia declared neutrality, but this proved futile in World War II.

=== World War II ===
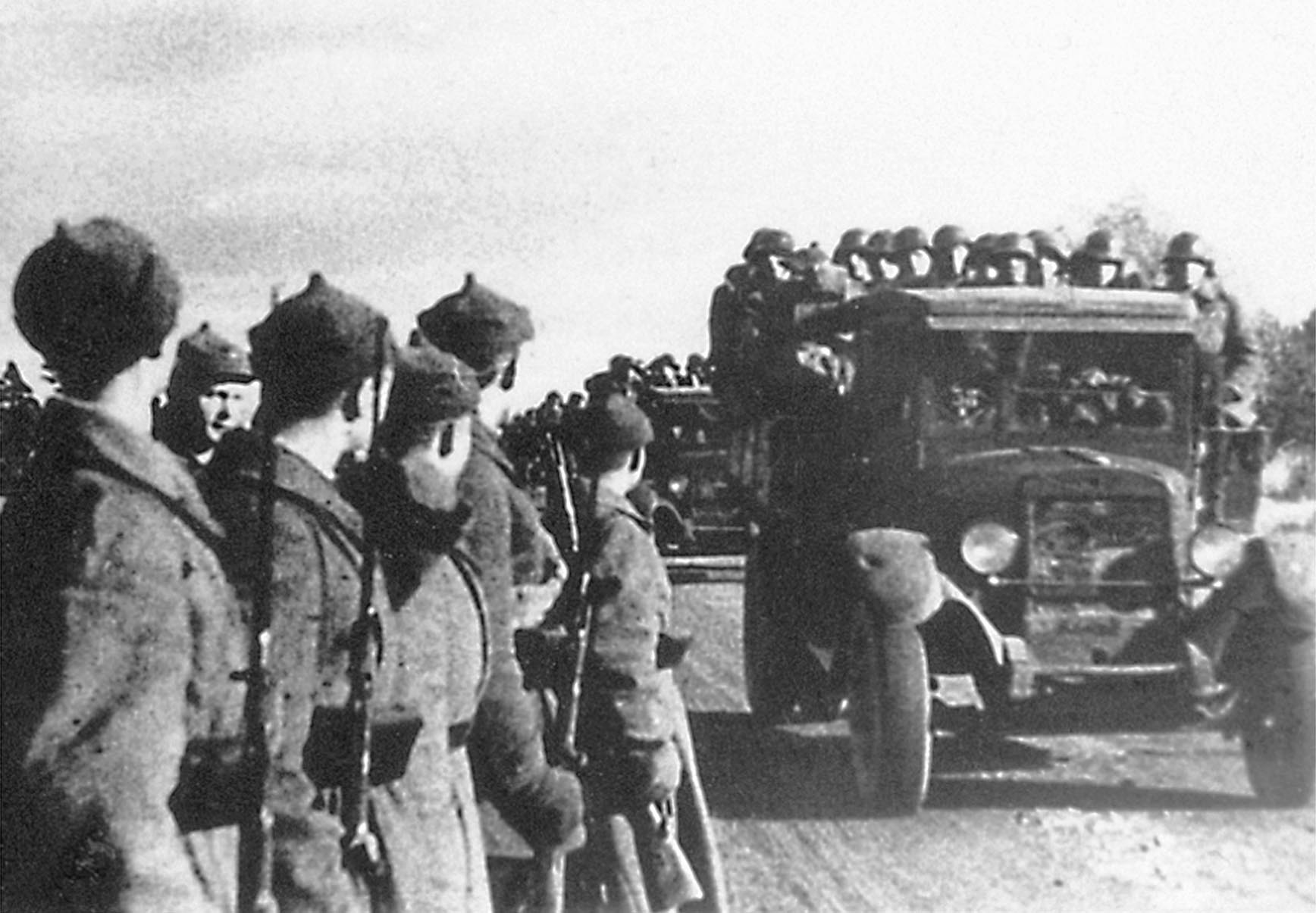
The Red Army troops moving into military bases in Estonia in October 1939, after the Soviet Union had forced Estonia to sign the Bases Treaty.

A week before the outbreak of World War II, on 23 August 1939, Nazi Germany and the Stalinist Soviet Union signed the Molotov–Ribbentrop Pact. In the pact's secret protocol Poland, Romania, Lithuania, Latvia, Estonia and Finland were divided between USSR and Germany into "spheres of influence", with Estonia assigned to the Soviet "sphere". On 24 September 1939, the Soviet dictator Stalin presented the Estonian government an ultimatum demanding that Estonia immediately sign a treaty that would allow the USSR to establish military bases in Estonia, or else face war. The Estonian government decided to avoid military conflict, and a "mutual assistance treaty" was signed in Moscow on 28 September 1939. On 14 June 1940 the Soviet Union instituted a full naval and air blockade on Estonia. On the same day, the airliner Kaleva was shot down by the Soviet Air Force. On 16 June, the USSR presented an ultimatum demanding completely free passage of the Red Army into Estonia and the establishment of a pro-Soviet government. Feeling that resistance was hopeless, the Estonian government complied and, on the next day, the whole country was occupied. On 6 August 1940, Estonia was annexed by the Soviet Union as the Estonian SSR.

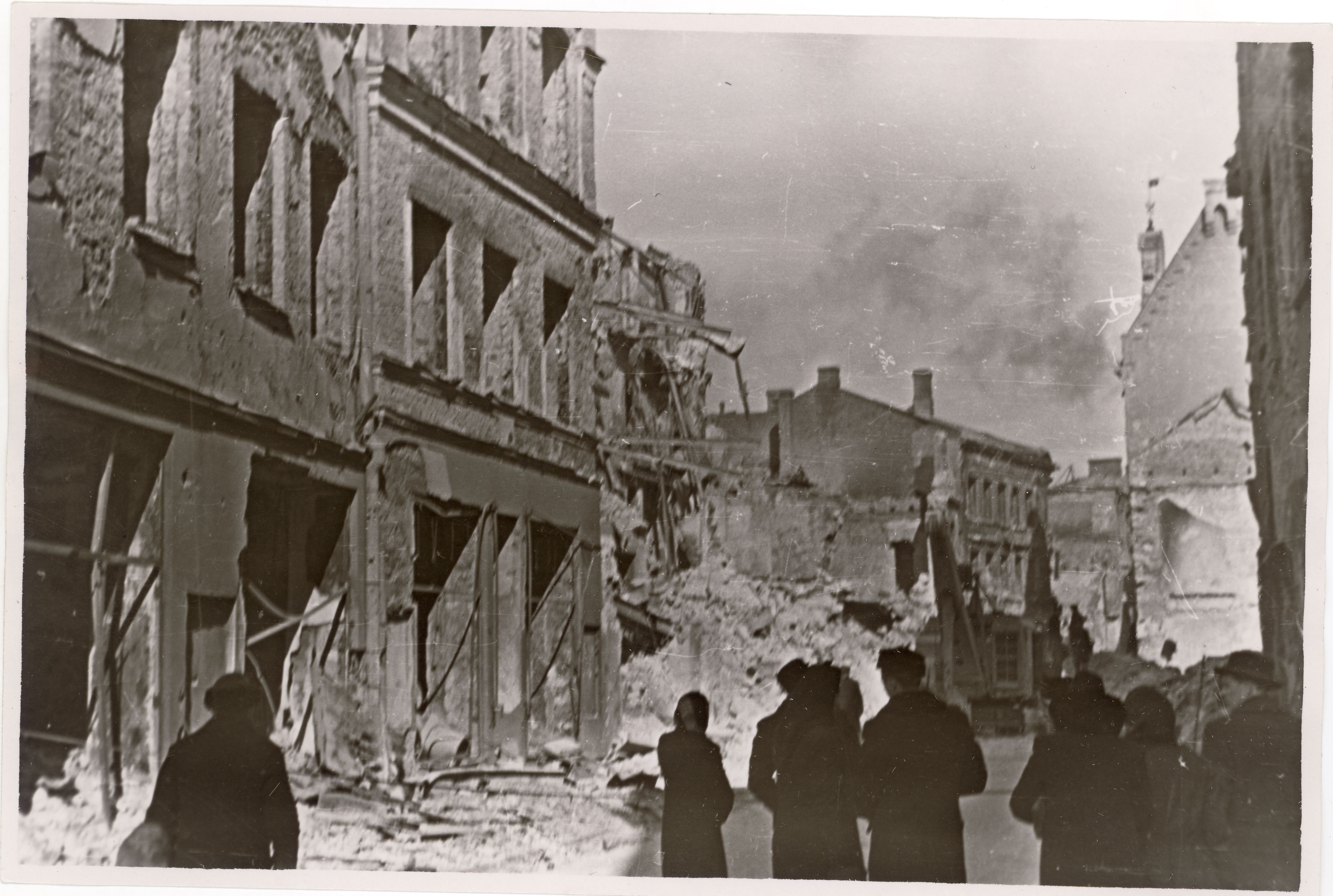
The capital Tallinn after bombing by the Soviet Air Force during the war on the Eastern Front in March 1944

The USSR established a repressive wartime regime in occupied Estonia. Many of the country's high-ranking civil and military officials, intelligentsia and industrialists were arrested. Soviet repressions culminated on 14 June 1941 with mass deportation of around 11,000 people to Russia. When Operation Barbarossa (accompanied by Estonian guerrilla soldiers called "Forest Brothers") began against the Soviet Union on 22 June 1941 in the form of the "Summer War" (Estonian: Suvesõda), around 34,000 young Estonian men were forcibly drafted into the Red Army, fewer than 30% of whom survived the war. Soviet destruction battalions initiated a scorched earth policy. Political prisoners who could not be evacuated were executed by the NKVD. Many Estonians went into the forest, starting an anti-Soviet guerrilla campaign. In July, German Wehrmacht reached south Estonia. The USSR evacuated Tallinn in late August with massive losses, and capture of the Estonian islands was completed by German forces in October.

Initially, many Estonians hoped that Germany would help to restore Estonia's independence, but this soon proved to be in vain. Only a puppet collaborationist administration was established, and occupied Estonia was merged into Reichskommissariat Ostland, with its economy being fully subjugated to German military needs. About a thousand Estonian Jews who had not managed to leave were almost all quickly killed in 1941. Numerous forced labour camps were established where thousands of Estonians, foreign Jews, Romani, and Soviet prisoners of war perished. German occupation authorities started recruiting men into small volunteer units but, as these efforts provided meagre results and the military situation worsened, forced conscription was instituted in 1943, eventually leading to formation of the Estonian Waffen-SS division. Thousands of Estonians who did not want to fight in the German military escaped to Finland, where many volunteered to fight together with Finns against Soviets.

The Red Army reached the Estonian borders again in early 1944, but its advance into Estonia was stopped in heavy fighting near Narva for six months by German forces, including numerous Estonian units. In March, the Soviet Air Force carried out heavy bombing raids against Tallinn and other Estonian towns. In July, the Soviets started a major offensive from the south, forcing the Germans to abandon mainland Estonia in September and the Estonian islands in November. As German forces were retreating from Tallinn, the last pre-war prime minister Jüri Uluots appointed a government headed by Otto Tief in an unsuccessful attempt to restore Estonia's independence. Tens of thousands of people, including most of the Estonian Swedes, fled westwards to avoid the new Soviet occupation.

Overall, Estonia lost about 25% of its population through deaths, deportations and evacuations in World War II. Estonia also suffered some irrevocable territorial losses, as the Soviet Union transferred border areas comprising about 5% of Estonian pre-war territory from the Estonian SSR to the Russian SFSR.

=== Second Soviet occupation ===
Estonian partisans, the "Forest Brothers".

Thousands of Estonians opposing the second Soviet occupation joined a guerrilla movement known as the "Forest Brothers". The armed resistance was heaviest in the first few years after the war, but Soviet authorities gradually wore it down through attrition, and resistance effectively ceased to exist in the mid-1950s. The Soviets initiated a policy of collectivisation, but as farmers remained opposed to it a campaign of terror was unleashed. In March 1949 about 20,000 Estonians were deported to Siberia. Collectivization was fully completed soon afterwards.

The Russian-dominated occupation authorities under the Soviet Union began Russification, with hundreds of thousands of ethnic Russians and other "Soviet people" being induced to settle in occupied Estonia, in a process which eventually threatened to turn indigenous Estonians into a minority in their own native land. In 1945 Estonians formed 97% of the population, but by 1989 their share of the population had fallen to 62%. Occupying authorities carried out campaigns of ethnic cleansing, mass deportation of indigenous populations, and mass colonization by Russian settlers which led to Estonia losing 3% of its native population. By March 1949, 60,000 people were deported from Estonia and 50,000 from Latvia to the gulag system in Siberia, where death rates were 30%. The only permitted party was the ruling Communist Party, along with its youth organization. Economically, heavy industry was strongly prioritised, but this did not improve the well-being of the local population, and caused massive environmental damage through pollution. Living standards under the Soviet occupation kept falling further behind nearby independent Finland. The country was heavily militarised, with closed military areas covering 2% of territory. Islands and most of the coastal areas were turned into a restricted border zone which required a special permit for entry. Estonia was quite closed until the second half of the 1960s, when gradually Estonians began to covertly watch Finnish television in the northern parts of the country, thus getting a better picture of the way of life behind the Iron Curtain.

The majority of Western countries considered the annexation of Estonia by the Soviet Union illegal. Legal continuity of the Estonian state was preserved through the government-in-exile and the Estonian diplomatic representatives which Western governments continued to recognise.

=== Independence restored ===
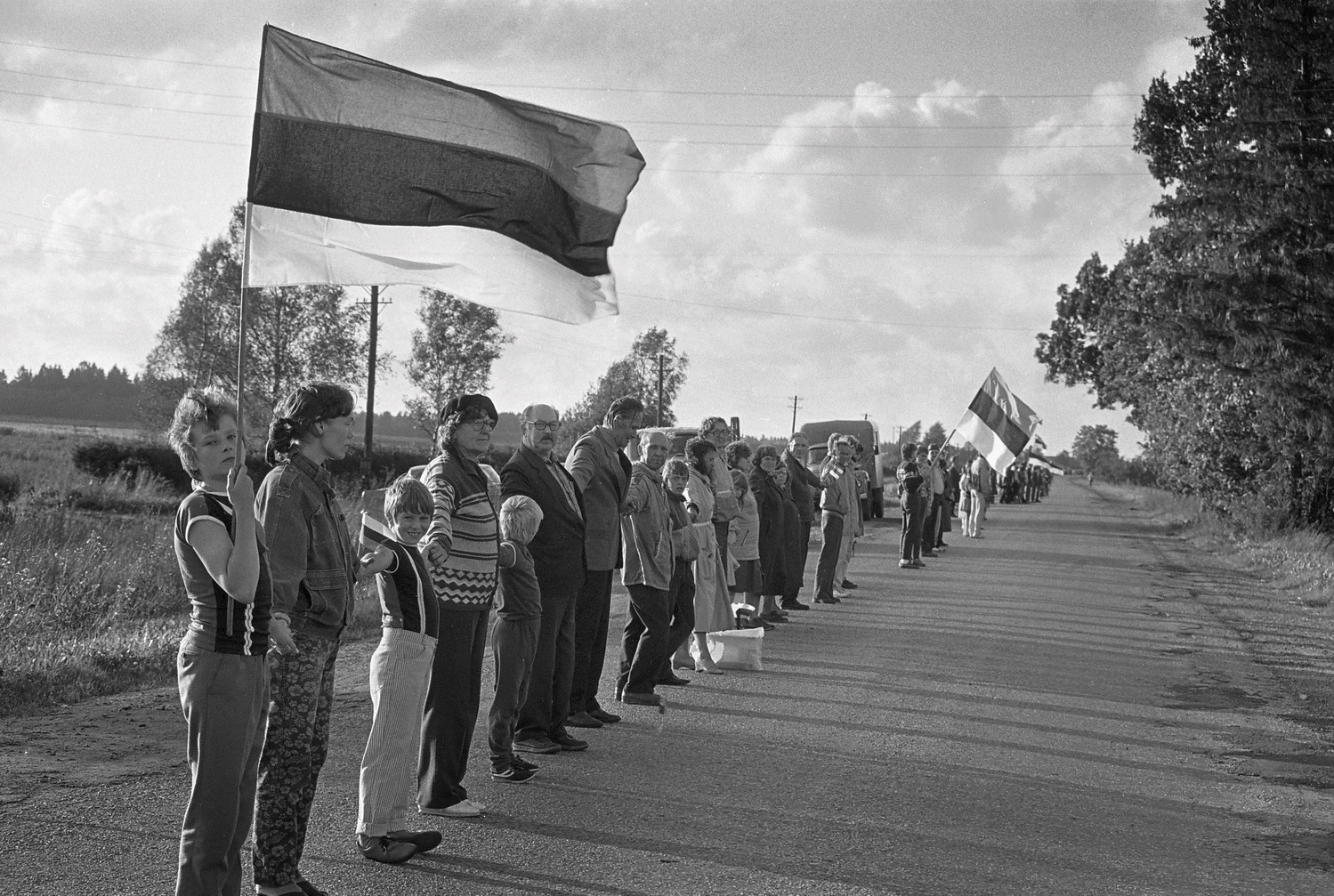
In the Baltic Way on 23 August 1989, two million people formed a human chain across three countries in a mass demonstration against the Soviet occupation.

The introduction of perestroika by the Soviet central authorities in 1985 made open political activity possible again in Estonia a few years later, which triggered an independence restoration process later known as laulev revolutsioon ("the Singing revolution"). The environmental Fosforiidisõda ("Phosphorite war") campaign became the first major protest movement against the central government. In 1988, new political movements appeared, such as the Popular Front of Estonia, which came to represent the moderate wing in the independence movement, and the more radical Estonian National Independence Party, which was the first non-communist party in the Soviet Union and demanded full restoration of independence. On 16 November 1988, after the first non-rigged multi-candidate elections in half a century, the parliament of Soviet-controlled Estonia issued the Sovereignty Declaration, asserting the primacy of Estonian laws. Over the next two years, many other administrative parts (or "republics") of the USSR followed the Estonian example, issuing similar declarations. On 23 August 1989, about 2 million Estonians, Latvians and Lithuanians participated in a mass demonstration, forming the Baltic Way human chain across the three countries. In February 1990, elections were held to form the Congress of Estonia. In March 1991, a referendum was held where 78.4% of voters supported full independence. During the coup attempt in Moscow, Estonia declared restoration of independence on 20 August 1991.

Soviet authorities recognised Estonian independence on 6 September 1991, and on 17 September Estonia was admitted into the United Nations. The last units of the Russian army left Estonia in 1994.

In 1992 radical economic reforms were launched for switching over to a market economy, including privatisation and currency reform. Estonia has been a member of the WTO since 13 November 1999.

Since regaining independence in 1991, Estonian foreign policy has been aligned with other Western democracies, and in 2004 Estonia joined both the European Union and NATO. On 9 December 2010, Estonia became a member of OECD. On 1 January 2011, Estonia joined the eurozone and adopted the euro, the single currency of EU. Estonia was a member of the UN Security Council from 2020 to 2021.

The 100th Anniversary of the Estonian Republic was celebrated on 24 February 2018.

English is the most widely spoken foreign language in Estonia today. According to the most recent (2021) census data 76% of the population can speak a foreign language. After English, Russian is the second most widely spoken foreign language in Estonia, and in the census 17% of the native speakers of standard Estonian reported that they can also speak a dialect of Estonian.

== Geography ==
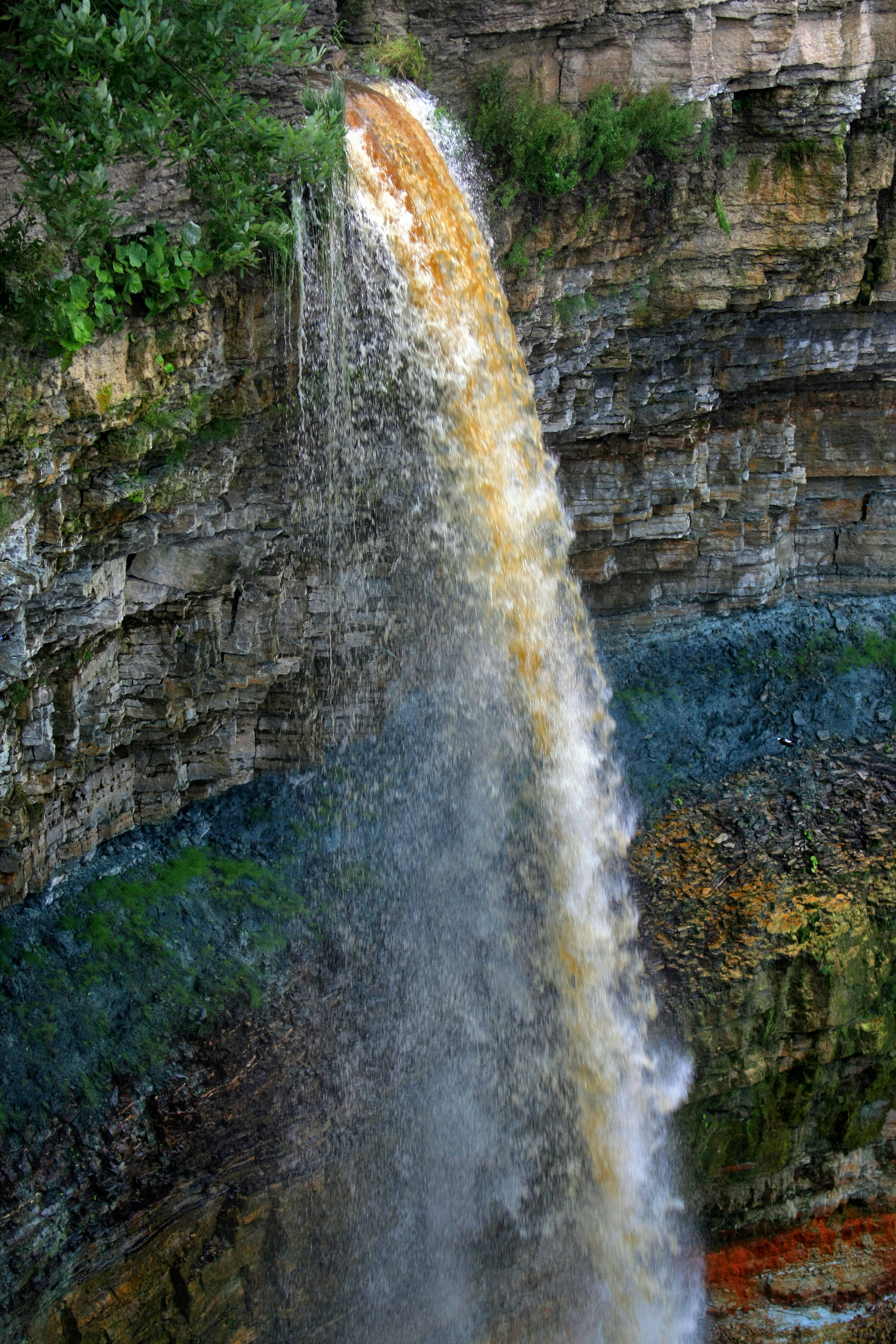
The cliff at Valaste Falls illustrates the stratigraphy of various geological eras

Estonia is situated in Europe, on the East European Plain Estonian territory covers 45,335 km^{2} (17,504 sq mi), of which internal waters comprise 4.6%. When including the territorial sea, the Estonian border encompasses 70,177 km^{2} (27,095 sq mi).

Estonia coastline is indented stretching for 3,794 kilometres (2,357 mi)including the islands, and is notable for its limestone cliffs at the northern coast and largest islands. The total number of Estonian islands, including those in internal waters, is 2,355, of which 2,222 are in the Baltic Sea. The largest islands are Saaremaa and Hiiumaa. There are over 1560 natural lakes, the largest being Lake Peipus at the border of Russia, and Võrtsjärv in central Estonia. Additionally there are many artificial water reservoirs. There are over 7000 rivers, streams, and canals in the country; of these, only ten are longer than 100 kilometres (62 mi). In terms of discharge, Narva is the largest of the rivers. The longest rivers of Estonia are Võhandu — 162 kilometres (101 mi) and Pärnu —144 kilometres (89 mi), followed by the Põltsamaa, Pedja, Kasari, Keila, and Jägala rivers. Bogs and mires cover 23.2% of the land. Generally the terrain is flat, average elevation above the sea level being about 50 metres (164 ft). Only 10% of the country's terrain is greater than 100 metres (328 ft) in height, with Haanja Upland containing the highest peak, Suur Munamägi, at 318 metres (1,043 ft).

=== Climate ===
Estonia is situated in the temperate climate zone, and in the transition zone between maritime and continental climate, characterized by warm summers and fairly mild winters. Estonia's climate is notably milder than that of other regions at the same latitude due to the moderating effects of the North Atlantic Current. The prevailing weather patterns in Estonia are influenced by active cyclonic activity in the northern Atlantic Ocean. This results in strong winds, precipitation, and abrupt temperature fluctuations, especially during the autumn and winter months. The westerly winds carry moist maritime air far into continental interior, leading to milder temperatures in winter and cooler conditions in summer compared to the continental areas further away from the coast. Coastal regions and islands generally enjoy a milder climate, as the Baltic Sea moderates temperatures, keeping coastal areas warmer in winter and cooler in summer. The calculated mean temperature for the country's territory ranges from 17.8 °C (64.0 °F) in July to −3.8 °C (25.2 °F) in February, with the annual average being 6.4 °C (43.5 °F). The highest recorded temperature is 35.6 °C (96.1 °F) from 1992, although the unofficial record high temperature is 38.0 °C (104.8 °F) from the same year and the lowest is −43.5 °C (−46.3 °F) from 1940. The annual average precipitation is 662 millimetres (26.1 in), with the daily record being 148 millimetres (5.8 in). Snow cover varies significantly on different years. Prevailing winds are westerly, southwesterly, and southerly, the average annual wind speed varies between 2.1 m/s and 6.1 m/s, being smaller inland and the largest on the west coast. As a calculated average, Estonia receives 1830 hours of sunshine per year.

=== Biodiversity ===
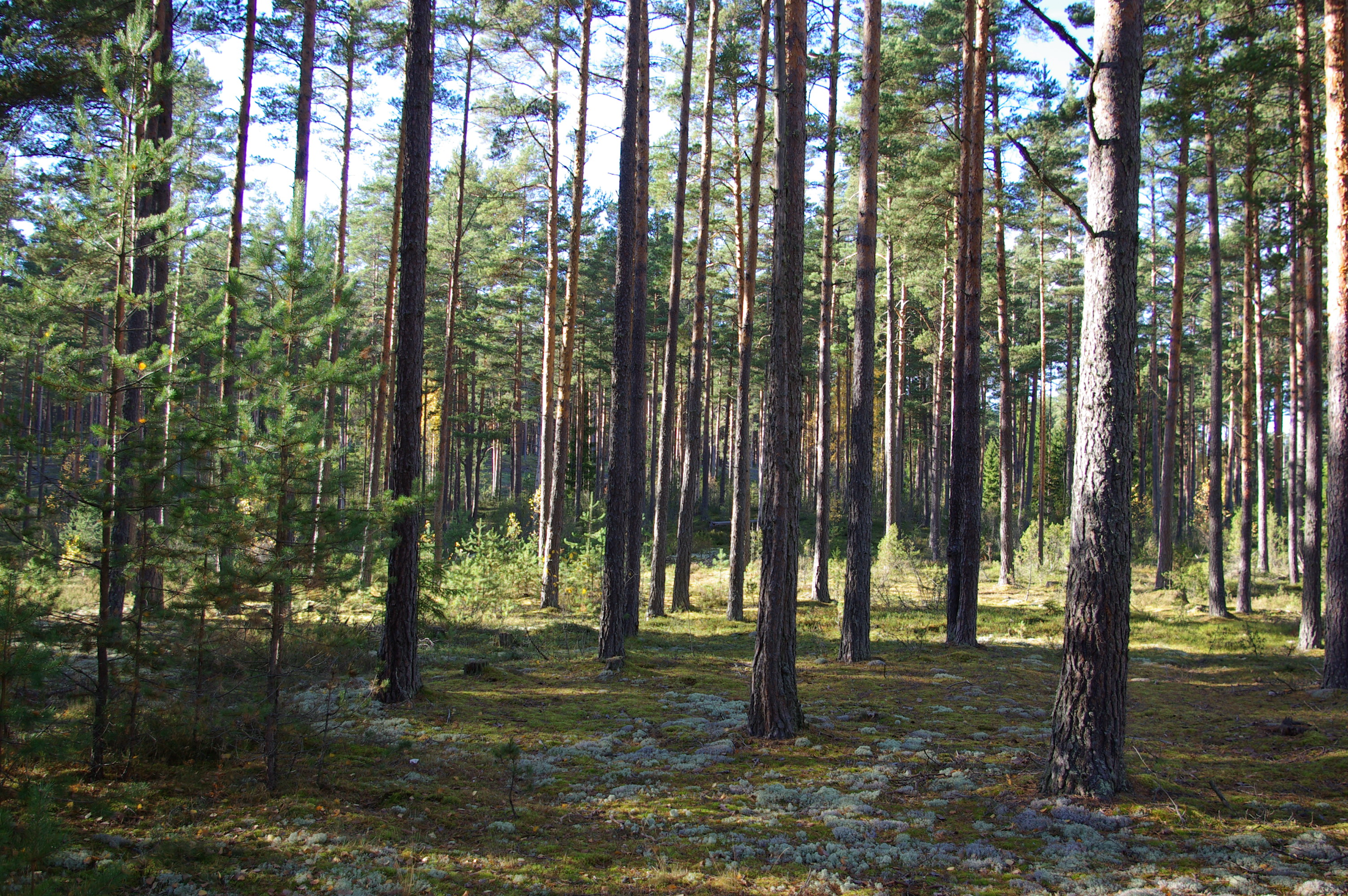
Scots pine Pinus sylvestris is the most common tree species in Estonian forests.

Due to varied climatic and soil conditions, and plethora of sea and internal waters, Estonia is one of the most biodiverse regions among the similar sized territories at the same latitude. Many species extinct in most other European countries can be still found in Estonia.

Recorded species include 64 mammals, 11 amphibians, and 5 reptiles. Large mammals present in Estonia include the grey wolf, lynx, brown bear, red fox, badger, wild boar, moose, roe deer, beaver, otter, grey seal, and ringed seal. The critically endangered European mink has been successfully reintroduced to the island of Hiiumaa, and the rare Siberian flying squirrel is present in east Estonia. The red deer, once extirpated, has also been successfully reintroduced. In the beginning of the 21st century, an isolated population of European jackals was confirmed in Western Estonia, much further north than their earlier known range. The number of jackals has grown quickly in coastal areas of Estonia and can be found in Matsalu National Park. Introduced mammals include sika deer, fallow deer, raccoon dog, muskrat, and American mink.

Over 300 bird species have been found in Estonia, including the white-tailed eagle, lesser spotted eagle, golden eagle, western capercaillie, black and white stork, numerous species of owls, waders, geese and many others. The barn swallow is the national bird of Estonia.

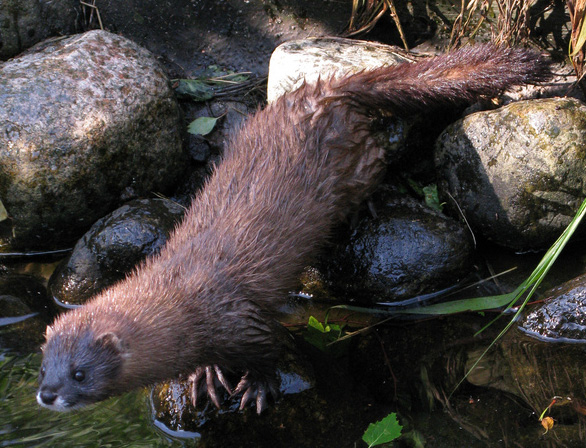
Estonia is one of the few countries where critically endangered European mink is present in the wild

Phytogeographically, Estonia is shared between the Central European and Eastern European provinces of the Circumboreal Region within the Boreal Kingdom. According to the WWF, the territory of Estonia belongs to the ecoregion of Sarmatic mixed forests. Estonia has a rich composition of floristic groups, with estimated 6000 (3461 identified) fungi, 3000 (2500 identified) algae and cyanobacteria, 850 (786 identified) lichens, and 600 (507 identified) bryophytes. Forests cover approximately half of the country. 87 native and over 500 introduced tree and bush species have been identified, with most prevalent tree species being pine (41%), birch (28%), and spruce (23%). Since 1969, the cornflower (Centaurea cyanus) has been the national flower of Estonia.

Protected areas cover 19.4% of Estonian land and 23% of its total area together with territorial sea. Overall there are 3,883 protected natural objects, including 6 national parks, 231 nature conservation areas, and 154 landscape reserves.

== Politics ==
Ülle Madise
President since 2026

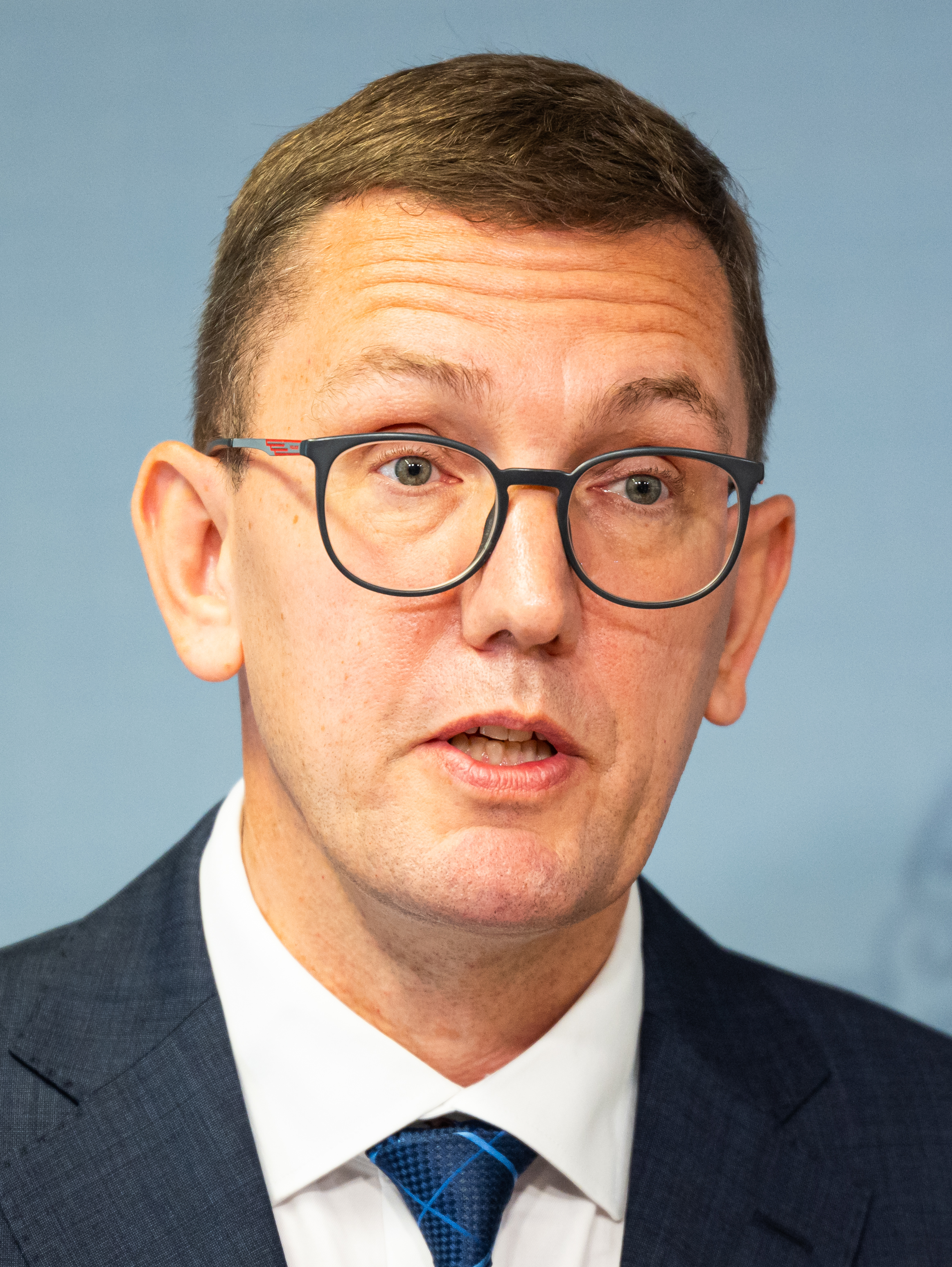
Kristen Michal
Prime Minister since 2024

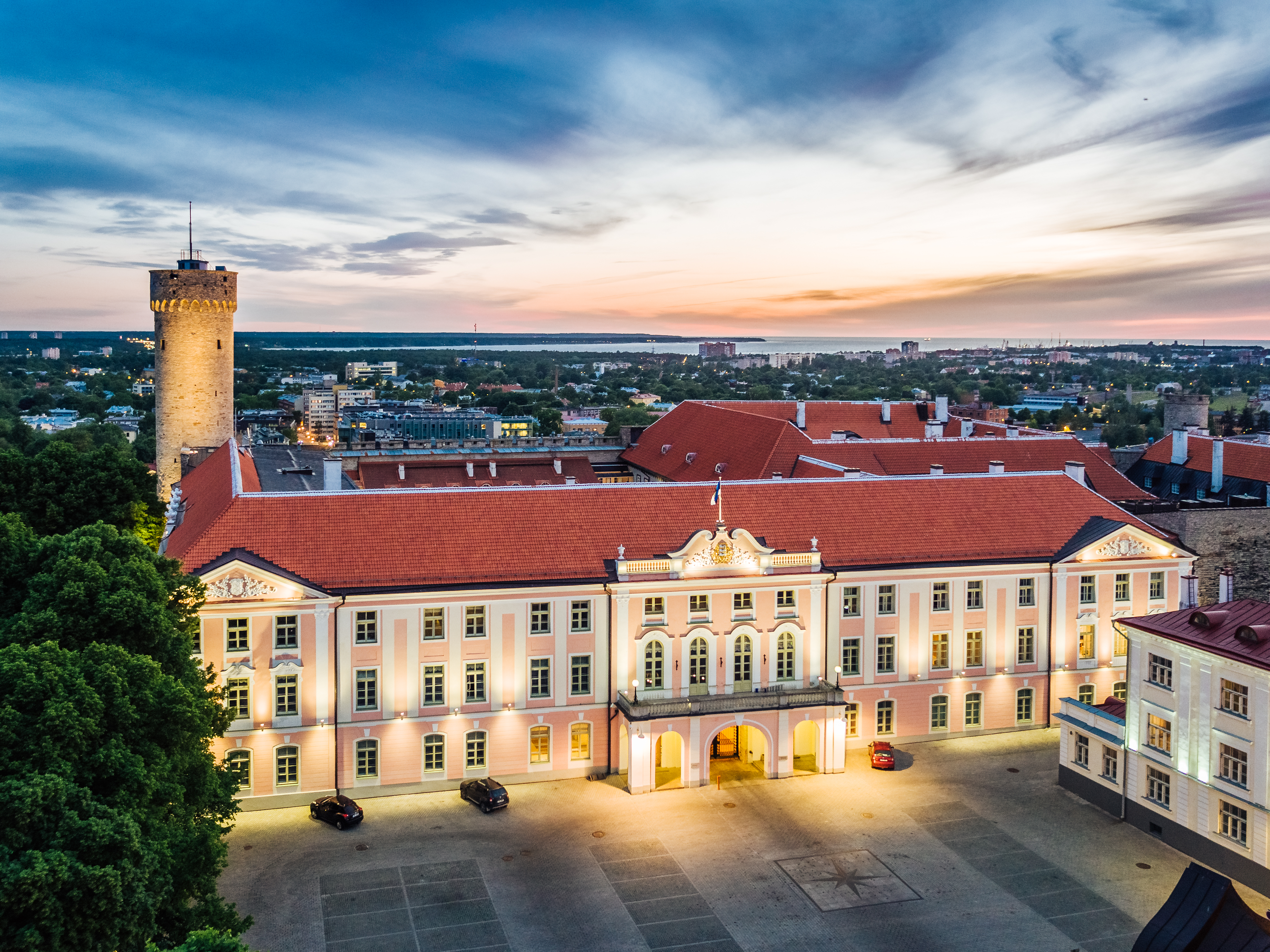
The seat of the Parliament of Estonia in Toompea Castle

Estonia is a unitary parliamentary republic. The unicameral parliament Riigikogu serves as the legislature and the government as the executive.

Estonian parliament Riigikogu is elected by citizens over 18 years of age for a four-year term by proportional representation, and has 101 members. Riigikogu's responsibilities include approval and preservation of the national government, passing legal acts, passing the state budget, and conducting parliamentary supervision. On proposal of the president Riigikogu appoints the Chief Justice of the Supreme Court, the chairman of the board of the Bank of Estonia, the Auditor General, the Legal Chancellor, and the Commander-in-Chief of the Defence Forces.

The Government of Estonia is formed by the Prime Minister of Estonia at recommendation of the President, and approved by the Riigikogu. The government, headed by the Prime Minister, carries out domestic and foreign policy. Ministers head ministries and represent its interests in the government. Sometimes ministers with no associated ministry are appointed, known as ministers without portfolio. Estonia has been ruled by coalition governments because no party has been able to obtain an absolute majority in the parliament.

The head of the state is the President who has a primarily representative and ceremonial role. There is no popular vote on the election of the president, but the president is elected by the Riigikogu, or by a special electoral college. The President proclaims the laws passed in the Riigikogu, and has the right to refuse proclamation and return law in question for a new debate and decision. If Riigikogu passes the law unamended, then the President has right to propose to the Supreme Court to declare the law unconstitutional. The President also represents the country in international relations.

The Constitution of Estonia also provides possibility for direct democracy through referendum, although since adoption of the constitution in 1992 the only referendum has been the referendum on European Union membership in 2003.

Estonia has pursued the development of the e-government, with 99 percent of the public services being available on the web 24 hours a day. In 2005, Estonia became the first country in the world to introduce nationwide binding Internet voting in local elections of 2005. In the 2023 parliamentary elections 51% of the total votes were cast over the internet, becoming the first time when more than half of votes were cast online.

In the most recent parliamentary elections of 2023, six parties gained seats at Riigikogu. The head of the Reform Party, Kaja Kallas, formed the government together with Estonia 200 and Social Democratic Party, while Conservative People's Party, Centre Party and Isamaa became the opposition.

=== Law ===
The Constitution of Estonia is the fundamental law, establishing the constitutional order based on five principles: human dignity, democracy, rule of law, social state, and the Estonian identity. Estonia has a civil law legal system based on the Germanic legal model. The court system has a three-level structure. The first instance are county courts which handle all criminal and civil cases, and administrative courts which hear complaints about government and local officials, and other public disputes. The second instance are district courts which handle appeals about the first instance decisions. The Supreme Court is the court of cassation, conducts constitutional review, and has 19 members. The judiciary is independent, judges are appointed for life, and can be removed from office only when convicted of a crime. The justice system has been rated among the most efficient in the European Union by the EU Justice Scoreboard. As of June 2023, gay registered partners and married couples have the right to adopt. Gay couples gained the right to marriage in Estonia in 2024.

=== Foreign relations ===
Estonia was a member of the League of Nations from 22 September 1921, and became a member of the United Nations on 17 September 1991. Since restoration of independence Estonia has pursued close relations with the Western countries, and has been member of NATO and the European Union since 2004. In 2007, Estonia joined the Schengen Area, and in 2011 the Eurozone. The European Union Agency for large-scale IT systems is based in Tallinn, and started operations at the end of 2012. Estonia held the Presidency of the Council of the European Union in the second half of 2017.

Since the early 1990s, Estonia has been involved in active trilateral Baltic states co-operation with Latvia and Lithuania, and Nordic-Baltic co-operation with the Nordic countries. Estonia is a member of the interparliamentary Baltic Assembly, the intergovernmental Baltic Council of Ministers and the Council of the Baltic Sea States. Estonia has built close relationship with the Nordic countries, especially Finland and Sweden, and is a member of Nordic-Baltic Eight. Joint Nordic-Baltic projects include the education programme Nordplus and mobility programmes for business and industry and for public administration. The Nordic Council of Ministers has an office in Tallinn with a subsidiaries in Tartu and Narva. The Baltic states are members of Nordic Investment Bank, European Union's Nordic Battle Group, and in 2011 were invited to co-operate with Nordic Defence Cooperation in selected activities.

The beginning of the attempt to redefine Estonia as "Nordic" was seen in December 1999, when then Estonian foreign minister (and President of Estonia from 2006 until 2016) Toomas Hendrik Ilves delivered a speech entitled "Estonia as a Nordic Country" to the Swedish Institute for International Affairs, with the potential political calculation behind it being the wish to distinguish Estonia from its more slowly progressing southern neighbours, which could have postponed early participation in European Union enlargement. Andres Kasekamp argued in 2005, that relevance of identity discussions in Baltic states decreased with their entrance into EU and NATO together, but predicted, that in the future, attractiveness of Nordic identity in Baltic states will grow and eventually, five Nordic states plus three Baltic states will become a single unit.

Other Estonian international organisation memberships include OECD, OSCE, WTO, IMF, the Council of the Baltic Sea States, and on 7 June 2019, was elected a non-permanent member of the United Nations Security Council for a two-year term that began on 1 January 2020.

Since the Soviet era, the relations with Russia remain generally cold, even though practical co-operation has taken place in between. Since 24 February 2022, the relations with Russia have further deteriorated due to Russia's invasion of Ukraine. Estonia has very actively supported Ukraine during the war, providing highest support relative to its gross domestic product.

=== Military ===
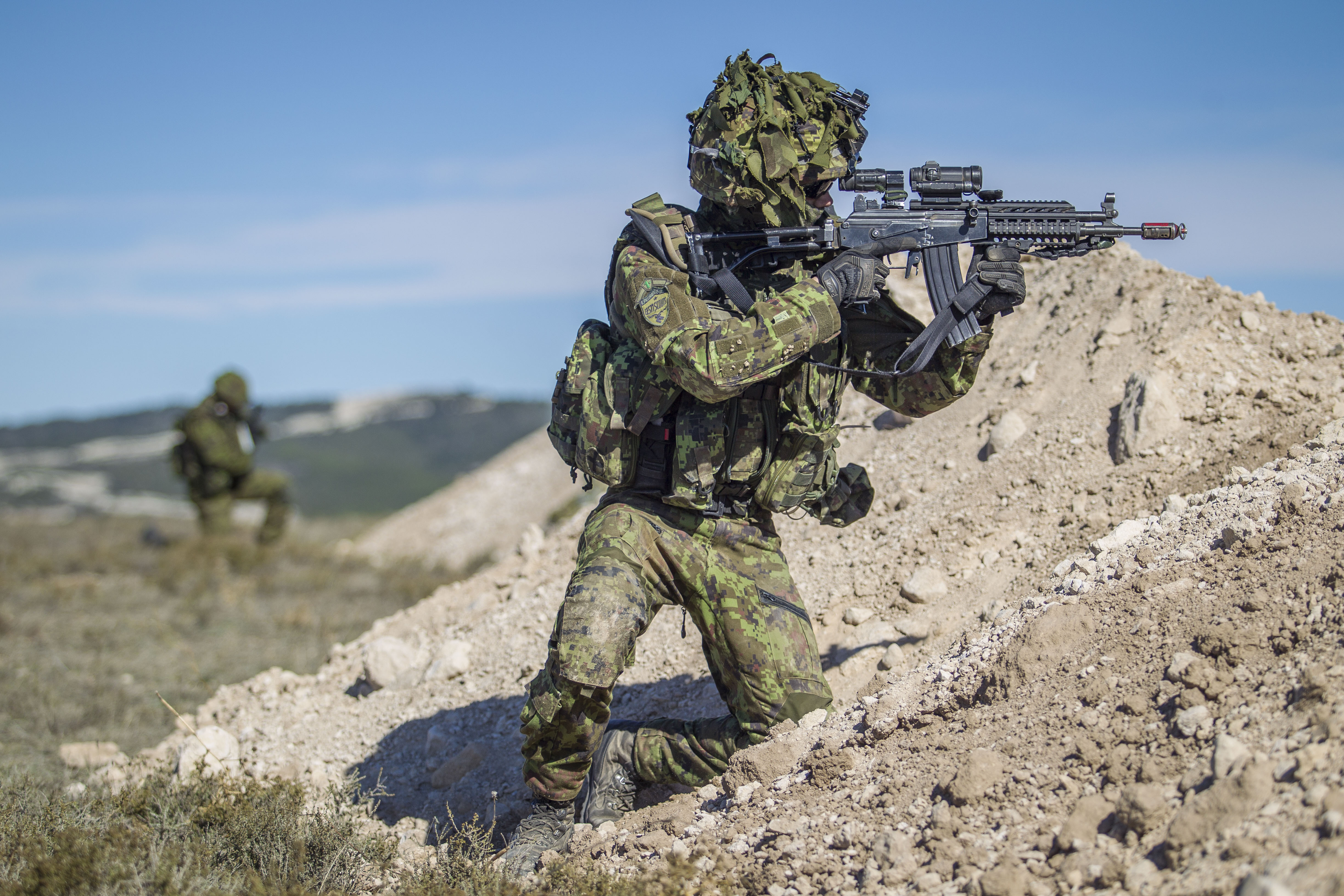
Estonian soldiers during a NATO exercise in 2015

The Estonian Defence League is a voluntary national defence organisation under management of Ministry of Defence. It is organised based on military principles, has its own military equipment, and provides various different military training for its members, including in guerilla tactics. The Defence League has 17,000 members, with additional 11,000 volunteers in its affiliated organisations.

Estonia co-operates with Latvia and Lithuania in several trilateral Baltic defence co-operation initiatives. As part of Baltic Air Surveillance Network (BALTNET) the three countries manage the Baltic airspace control center, Baltic Battalion (BALTBAT) has participated in the NATO Response Force, and a joint military educational institution Baltic Defence College is located in Tartu.

Estonia joined NATO on 29 March 2004. NATO Cooperative Cyber Defence Centre of Excellence was established in Tallinn in 2008. In response to Russian war in Ukraine, since 2017 a NATO Enhanced Forward Presence battalion battle group has been based in Tapa Army Base. Also part of NATO, the Baltic Air Policing deployment has been based in Ämari Air Base since 2014. In the European Union, Estonia participates in Nordic Battlegroup and Permanent Structured Cooperation.

According to the 2024 Global Peace Index, Estonia is the 24th most peaceful country in the world. Since 1995, Estonia has participated in numerous international security and peacekeeping missions, including: Afghanistan, Iraq, Lebanon, Kosovo, and Mali. The peak strength of Estonian deployment in Afghanistan was 289 soldiers in 2009. Eleven Estonian soldiers have been killed in missions of Afghanistan and Iraq.

=== Administrative divisions ===
Administrative divisions of Estonia

Estonia is a unitary country with a single-tier local government system. Local affairs are managed autonomously by local governments. Since administrative reform in 2017, there are in total 79 local governments, including 15 towns and 64 rural municipalities. All municipalities have equal legal status and form part of a maakond (county), which is an administrative subunit of the state. Representative body of local authorities is municipal council, elected at general direct elections for a four-year term. The council appoints local government. For towns, the head of the local government is linnapea (mayor) and vallavanem for parishes. For additional decentralization the local authorities may form municipal districts with limited authority, currently those have been formed in Tallinn and Hiiumaa.

Separately from administrative units, there are also settlement units: village, small borough, borough, and town. Generally, villages have less than 300, small boroughs have between 300 and 1000, boroughs and towns have over 1000 inhabitants.

== Economy ==
As a member of the European Union and OECD, Estonia is considered a high-income economy by the World Bank. The GDP (PPP) per capita of the country was $46,385 in 2023 according to the International Monetary Fund, ranked 40th.

Estonia ranks highly in international rankings for quality of life, education, press freedom, digitalisation of public services and the prevalence of technology companies.

Beginning 1 January 2011, Estonia adopted the euro and became the 17th eurozone member state.

Estonia produces about 75% of its consumed electricity. In 2011, about 85% of it was generated with locally mined oil shale. Alternative energy sources such as wood, peat, and biomass make up approximately 9% of primary energy production. Renewable wind energy was about 6% of total consumption in 2009. Estonia imports petroleum products from western Europe and Russia. Estonia imports 100% of its natural gas from Russia. Oil shale energy, telecommunications, textiles, chemical products, banking, services, food and fishing, timber, shipbuilding, electronics, and transportation are key sectors of the economy. The ice-free port of Muuga, near Tallinn, is a modern facility featuring good transhipment capability, a high-capacity grain elevator, chill/frozen storage, and new oil tanker off-loading capabilities.

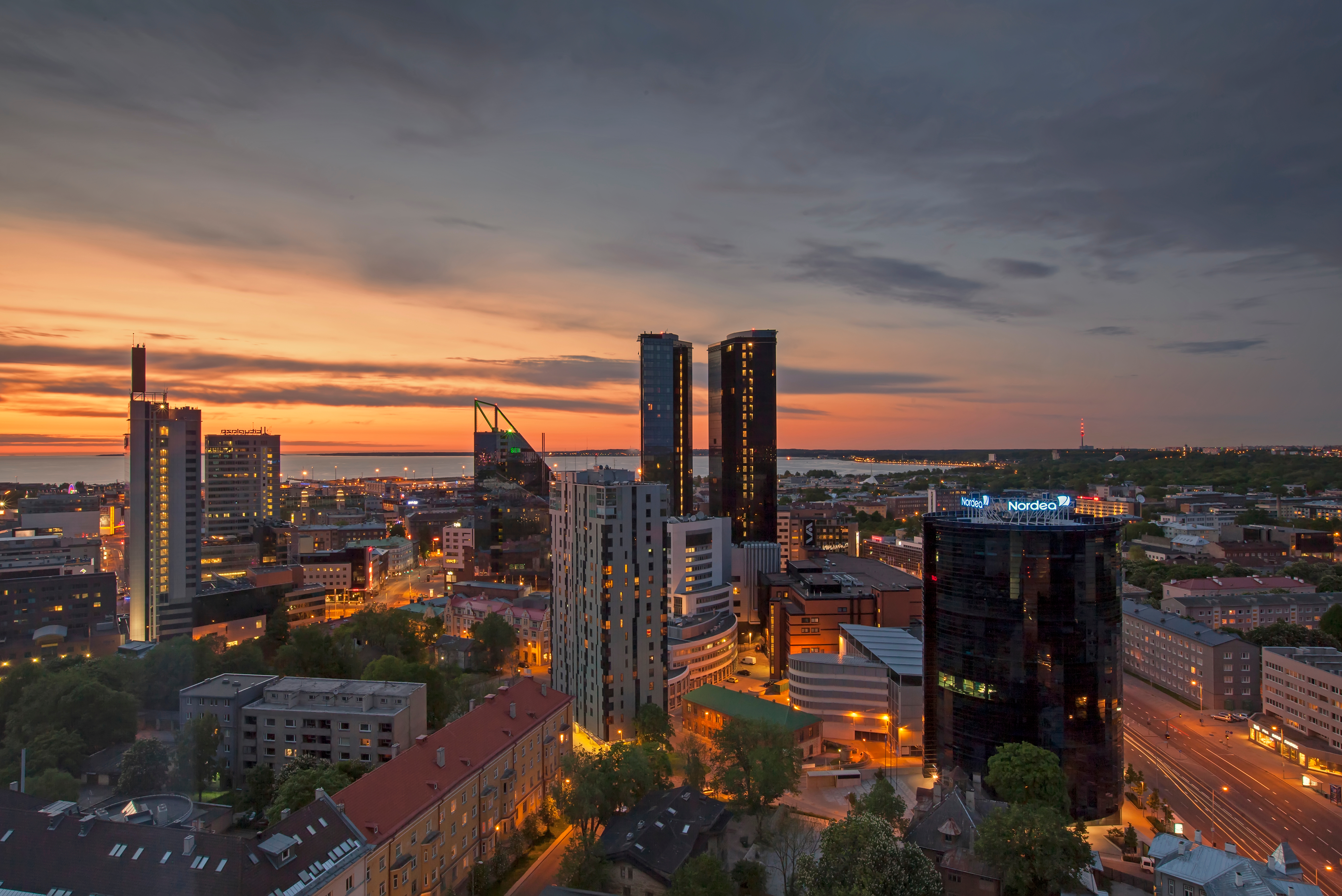
The central business district of Tallinn

Because of the global economic recession that began in 2007, the GDP of Estonia decreased by 1.4% in the 2nd quarter of 2008, over 3% in the 3rd quarter of 2008, and over 9% in the 4th quarter of 2008. The Estonian government made a supplementary negative budget, which was passed by Riigikogu. The revenue of the budget was decreased for 2008 by EEK 6.1 billion and the expenditure by EEK 3.2 billion. In 2010, the economic situation stabilised and started a growth based on strong exports. In the fourth quarter of 2010, Estonian industrial output increased by 23% compared to the year before. The country has been experiencing economic growth ever since.

According to Eurostat data, Estonian PPS GDP per capita stood at 67% of the EU average in 2008. In 2017, the average monthly gross salary in Estonia was €1221.

However, there are vast disparities in GDP between different areas of Estonia; currently, over half of the country's GDP is created in Tallinn. In 2008, the GDP per capita of Tallinn stood at 172% of the Estonian average, which makes the per capita GDP of Tallinn as high as 115% of the European Union average, exceeding the average levels of other counties.

The unemployment rate in March 2016 was 6.4%, which is below the EU average, while real GDP growth in 2011 was 8.0%, five times the euro-zone average. In 2012, Estonia remained the only euro member with a budget surplus, and with a national debt of only 6%, it is one of the least indebted countries in Europe.

In 2024, Estonia is ranked 1st in Environmental Performance Index globally.

=== Economic indicators ===
Estonia's economy continues to benefit from a transparent government and policies that sustain a high level of economic freedom, ranking 6th globally and 2nd in Europe. The rule of law remains strongly buttressed and enforced by an independent and efficient judicial system. A simplified tax system with flat rates and low indirect taxation, openness to foreign investment, and a liberal trade regime have supported the resilient and well-functioning economy. As of May 2018, the Ease of Doing Business Index by the World Bank Group places the country 16th in the world. The strong focus on the IT sector through its e-Estonia program has led to much faster, simpler and efficient public services where for example filing a tax return takes less than five minutes and 98% of banking transactions are conducted through the internet. Estonia has the 13th lowest business bribery risk in the world, according to TRACE Matrix.

Estonia is a developed country with an advanced, high-income economy that was among the fastest-growing in the EU since its entry in 2004. The country ranks very high in the Human Development Index, and compares well in measures of economic freedom, civil liberties, education, and press freedom. Estonian citizens receive universal health care, free education, and the longest paid maternity leave in the OECD. One of the world's most digitally-advanced societies, in 2005 Estonia became the first state to hold elections over the Internet, and in 2014, the first state to provide e-residency.

=== Historic development ===
Real GDP per capita development of Estonia, Latvia and Lithuania

In 1928, a stable currency, the kroon, was established. It is issued by the Bank of Estonia, the country's central bank. The word kroon (Estonian pronunciation: [ˈkroːn], "crown") is related to that of the other Nordic currencies (such as the Swedish krona and the Danish and Norwegian krone). The kroon succeeded the mark in 1928 and was used until 1940. After Estonia regained its independence, the kroon was reintroduced in 1992.

After restoring full independence, in the 1990s, Estonia styled itself as the "gateway between East and West" and aggressively pursued economic reform and reintegration with the West. In 1994, applying the economic theories of Milton Friedman, Estonia became one of the first countries to adopt a flat tax, with a uniform rate of 26% regardless of personal income. This rate has since been reduced several times, e.g., to 24% in 2005, 23% in 2006, and to 21% in 2008. The Government of Estonia finalised the design of Estonian euro coins in late 2004, and adopted the euro as the country's currency on 1 January 2011, later than planned due to continued high inflation. A Land Value Tax is levied which is used to fund local municipalities. It is a state-level tax, but 100% of the revenue is used to fund Local Councils. The rate is set by the Local Council within the limits of 0.1–2.5%. It is one of the most important sources of funding for municipalities. The Land Value Tax is levied on the value of the land only with improvements and buildings not considered. Very few exemptions are considered on the land value tax and even public institutions are subject to the tax. The tax has contributed to a high rate (~90%) of owner-occupied residences within Estonia, compared to a rate of 67.4% in the United States.

In 1999, Estonia experienced its worst year economically since it regained independence in 1991, largely because of the impact of the 1998 Russian financial crisis. Estonia joined the WTO in November 1999. With assistance from the European Union, the World Bank and the Nordic Investment Bank, Estonia completed most of its preparations for European Union membership by the end of 2002. Estonia joined the OECD in 2010.

=== Transport ===
The Port of Tallinn, taking into account both cargo and passenger traffic, is one of the largest port enterprises of the Baltic Sea. In 2018, the enterprise was listed in Tallinn Stock Exchange. It was the first time in nearly 20 years in Estonia when a state-owned company went public in Estonia. It was also the 2nd largest IPO in Nasdaq Tallinn in the number of retail investors participating. The Republic of Estonia remains the largest shareholder and holds 67% of the company.

Owned by AS Eesti Raudtee, there are many significant railroad connections in Estonia, such as Tallinn–Narva railway, which is 209.6 km (130.2 mi) long main connection to St. Petersburg. The most important highways in Estonia, in other hand, includes Narva Highway (E20), Tartu Highway (E263) and Pärnu Highway (E67).

The Lennart Meri Tallinn Airport in Tallinn is the largest airport in Estonia. A smaller airport for international flights is also located in Tartu. International flights also used to operate via Pärnu airport.

=== Resources ===
In 2012, oil shale supplied 70% of Estonia's total primary energy and accounted for 4% of Estonia's gross domestic product. Although Estonia is in general resource-poor, the land still offers a large variety of smaller resources. The country has large oil shale and limestone deposits. In addition to oil shale and limestone, Estonia also has large reserves of phosphorite, pitchblende, and granite that currently are not mined, or not mined extensively.

Significant quantities of rare-earth oxides are found in tailings accumulated from 50 years of uranium ore, shale and loparite mining at Sillamäe. Because of the rising prices of rare earths, extraction of these oxides has become economically viable. The country currently exports around 3000 tonnes per annum, representing around 2% of world production.

=== Agriculture and forestry ===
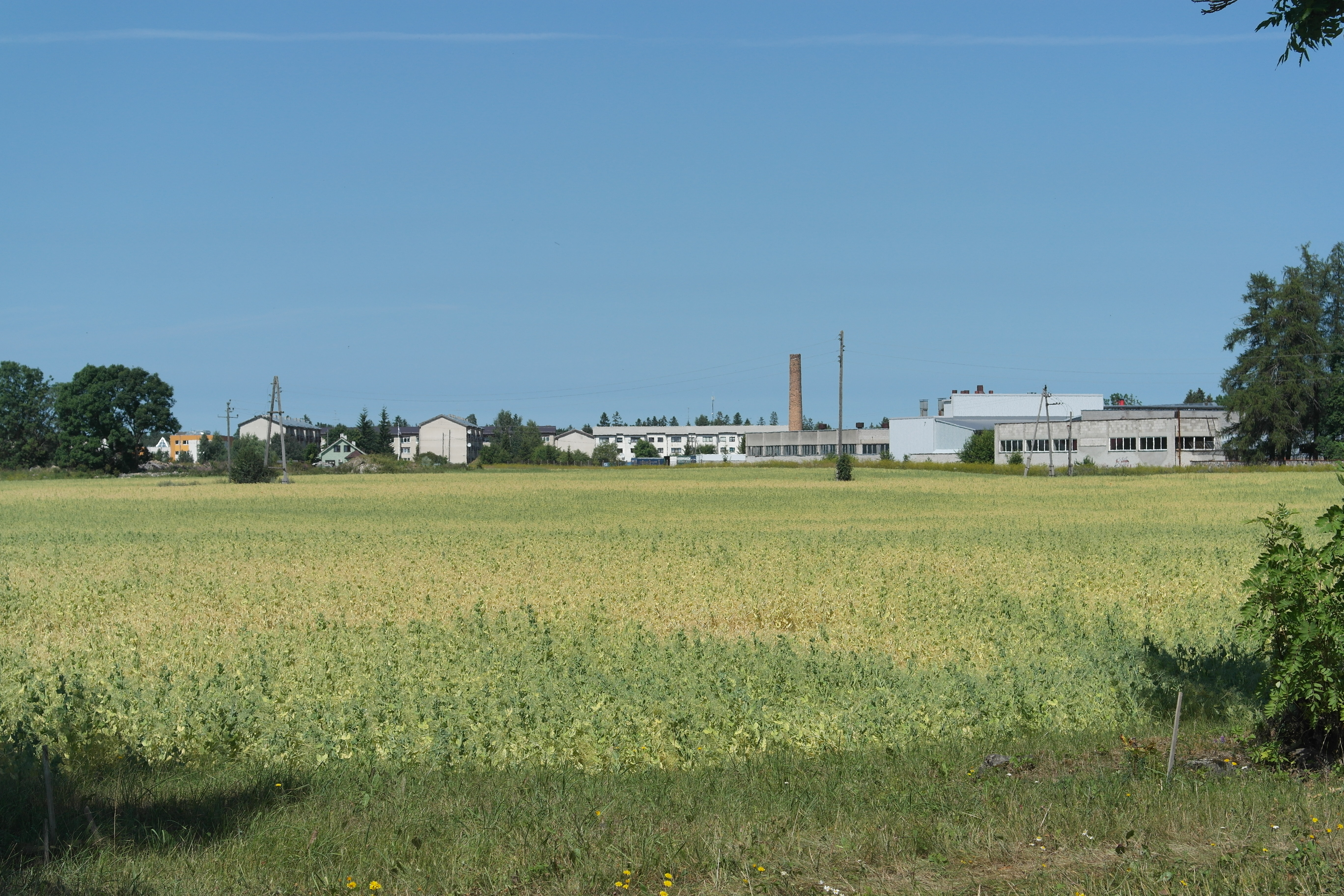
Crops near Aruküla in Northern Estonia

In the 1990s, agricultural significance in the economy declined sharply as large Soviet-era collective farms were dismantled and privatised. In recent years, large enterprises have once again become dominant, while smaller farms focus on niche markets, organic farming, and rural tourism. Recent years have seen an increase in Estonia's cultivated land, with approximately 1.05 million hectares of arable land and 0.24 million hectares of natural grasslands recorded by 2019. Estonia has one of the largest average farm sizes within the EU at 62 hectares per farm, with around 78% of farmland owned by entities managing at least 100 hectares – far above the EU average of 49% for this ownership category. Estonia ranks second in Europe, following Austria, in the proportion of farmland under organic cultivation. As of 2012, Estonia had forests that covered 48% of the land. Since at least 2009, there has been a substantial increase in logging, and logging occurs not only nationwide in private land, but even in supposedly protected land like the national park. Estonia needs to cut significantly less forest to retain biodiversity and meet the country's carbon sequestration goal, but it is increasing, and in 2022 the government ministry responsible for forestry, the RMK, reported a record profit of 1.4 billion euros.

=== Industry and environment ===
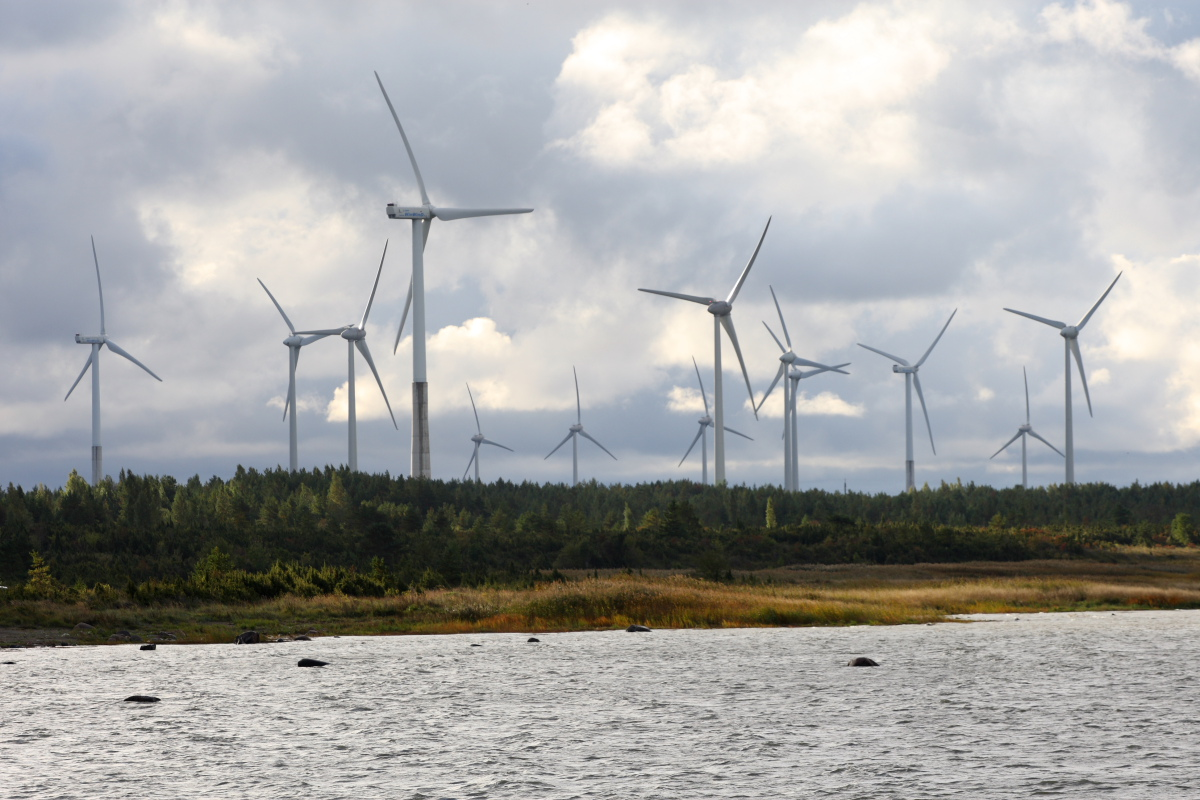
Rõuste wind farm in Lääneranna Parish

Food, construction, and electronic industries are currently among the most important branches of Estonia's industry. In 2007, the construction industry employed more than 80,000 people, around 12% of the entire country's workforce. Another important industrial sector is the machinery and chemical industry, which is mainly located in Ida-Viru county and around Tallinn.

The oil shale-based mining industry, also concentrated in East Estonia, produces around 73% of the entire country's electricity. Although the number of pollutants emitted has been falling since the 1980s, the air is still contaminated with sulphur dioxide from the mining industry the Soviet Union rapidly developed in the early 1950s. In some areas, coastal seawater is polluted, mainly around the Sillamäe industrial complex.

Estonia is dependent on other countries for energy. In recent years, many local and foreign companies have been investing in renewable energy sources. Wind power has been increasing steadily in Estonia and the total current amount of energy produced from wind is nearly 60 MW; another roughly 399 MW worth of projects are currently being developed and more than 2800 MW being proposed in the Lake Peipus area and coastal areas of Hiiumaa.

Currently, there are plans to renovate some older units of the Narva Power Plants, establish new power stations, and provide higher efficiency in oil shale-based energy production. Estonia liberalised 35% of its electricity market in April 2010; the electricity market as whole was to be liberalised by 2013.

Together with Lithuania, Poland, and Latvia, the country considered participating in constructing the Visaginas nuclear power plant in Lithuania to replace the Ignalina nuclear plant. However, due to the slow pace of the project and problems with the nuclear sector, Eesti Energia shifted its main focus to shale oil production, seen as far more profitable.

The Estonian electricity network forms a part of the Nord Pool Spot network.

Estonia has a strong information technology sector, partly owing to the Tiigrihüpe project undertaken in the mid-1990s, and has been mentioned as the most "wired" and advanced country in Europe in the terms of e-Government of Estonia. The 2014 e-residency program began offering those services to non-residents in Estonia.

Skype was written by Estonia-based developers Ahti Heinla, Priit Kasesalu and Jaan Tallinn, who had also originally developed Kazaa. Other notable startups that originated from Estonia include Bolt, GrabCAD, Fortumo and Wise (formerly known as TransferWise). It has been reported that Estonia has the highest startups per person ratio in the world. As of January 2022, there are 1,291 startups from Estonia, seven of which are unicorns, equalling nearly 1 startup per 1,000 Estonians.

=== Trade ===
Estonia has had a market economy since the end of the 1990s and one of the highest per capita income levels in Eastern Europe. Proximity to the Scandinavian and Finnish markets, its location between the East and West, competitive cost structure and a highly skilled labour force have been the major Estonian comparative advantages in the beginning of the 2000s (decade). As the largest city, Tallinn has emerged as a financial centre and the Tallinn Stock Exchange joined recently with the OMX system. Several cryptocurrency trading platforms are officially recognised by the government, such as CoinMetro. The current government has pursued tight fiscal policies, resulting in balanced budgets and low public debt.

== Demographics ==
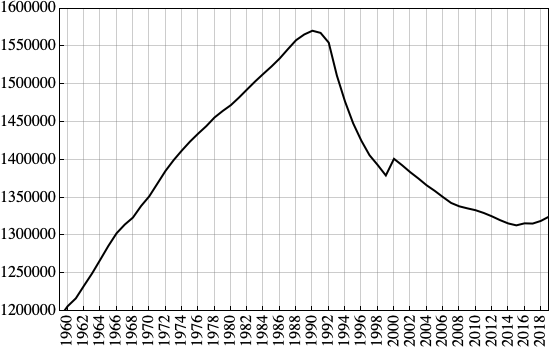
Population of Estonia 1960–2019. The changes are largely attributed to Soviet immigration and emigration.

Before World War II, ethnic Estonians made up 88% of the population, with national minorities constituting the remaining 12%. The largest minority groups in 1934 were Russians, Germans, Swedes, Latvians, Jews, Poles, and Finns. Other smaller minorities in Estonia are Armenians, Azerbaijanis, Moldovans, Chuvash, Karelians and Romani people.

The share of Baltic Germans in Estonia had fallen from 5.3% (~46,700) in 1881 to 1.3% (16,346) by 1934, mainly due to emigration to Germany in the light of general Russification at the end of the 19th century and the independence of Estonia in the 20th century.

Between 1945 and 1989, the share of ethnic Estonians in the population resident within the currently defined boundaries of Estonia dropped to 61%, caused primarily by the Soviet occupation and programme promoting mass immigration of urban industrial workers from Russia, Ukraine, and Belarus, as well as by wartime emigration and Joseph Stalin's mass deportations and executions. By 1989, ethnic minorities constituted more than one-third of the population, as the number of non-Estonians had grown almost fivefold.

At the end of the 1980s, Estonians perceived their demographic change as a national catastrophe. This was a result of the migration policies essential to the Sovietization program, which aimed to russify Estonia. In the decade after the restoration of Estonian independence, large-scale emigration by ethnic Russians and the removal of Russian military bases in 1994 caused the proportion of ethnic Estonians in Estonia to increase from 61% to 69% in 2006.

Modern Estonia is a fairly ethnically homogeneous country, but this historical homogeneity is a feature of 13 of the country's 15 maakond (counties). The mostly Russian-speaking immigrant population is concentrated in urban areas which administratively belong to two counties. Thus 13 of Estonia's 15 counties are over 80% ethnic Estonian, the most homogeneous being Hiiumaa, where Estonians account for 98.4% of the population. In the counties of Harju (including the capital city Tallinn) and Ida-Viru, however, ethnic Estonians make up 60% and 20% of the population, respectively. The ethnic Russian immigrant minority makes up about 24% of the country's total population today, but accounts for 35% of the population in Harju county and for a near-70% majority in Ida-Viru county.

The Estonian Cultural Autonomy law that was passed in 1925 was unique in Europe at that time. Cultural autonomies could be granted to minorities numbering more than 3,000 people with longstanding ties to the Republic of Estonia. Before the Soviet occupation, the German and Jewish minorities managed to elect a cultural council. The Law on Cultural Autonomy for National Minorities was reinstated in 1993. Historically, large parts of Estonia's northwestern coast and islands have been populated by the indigenous ethnic group of rannarootslased ("Coastal Swedes").

In recent years, the number of Swedish residents in Estonia has risen again, numbering almost 500 people by 2008, owing to property reforms enacted in the early 1990s. In 2004, the Ingrian Finnish minority in Estonia elected a cultural council and was granted cultural autonomy. The Estonian Swedes minority similarly received cultural autonomy in 2007. During the Russo-Ukrainian war of 2022, tens of thousands of Ukrainian refugees have arrived in Estonia.

There is also a Roma community in Estonia. Approximately 1,000-1,500 Roma live in Estonia.

=== Society ===
The Estonian society has undergone considerable changes since the country had restored full independence in 1991. Some of the more notable changes have taken effect in the level of stratification and distribution of family income. The Gini coefficient has held steadily higher than the European Union average (31 in 2009), although it has clearly dropped. The registered unemployment rate in January 2021 was 6.9%.

Estonia's population on 31 December 2021 (1,331,824 people) was about 3% higher than in the previous census of 2011. 84% of people residing in Estonia in 2021 lived in Estonia at the time of the previous census as well. 11% had been added by births and 5% by immigration over the ten years 2011–2021. Nowadays, 211 different self-reported ethnic groups are represented in the country's population and 243 different mother tongues are spoken. Census data indicate that Estonia has continued to stand out among European countries for its highly educated population – 43% of the population aged 25–64 have a university education, which puts Estonia in 7th place in Europe (Estonian women rank 3rd in terms of educational attainment).

More people of different ethnic origin live in Estonia than ever before, however the share of Estonians in the population has remained stable over the three censuses (2000: 68.3%; 2011: 69.8%; 2021: 69.4%). Estonian is spoken by 84% of the population: 67% of people speak it as their mother tongue and 17% as a foreign language. Compared with previous censuses, the proportion of people who speak Estonian has increased (2000: 80%; 2011: 82%), particularly due to people who have learned to speak Estonian as a foreign language (2000: 12%; 2011: 14%). It has been estimated that 76% of Estonia's population can speak a foreign language. As of 2021 census data, English is the most widely spoken foreign language in Estonia (overtaking the top position from Russian, which had still been the most widely spoken foreign language in Estonia in 2011 and earlier censuses). An estimated 17% of the native Estonian-speaking population can speak a dialect of Estonian.

As of 2 July 2010, 84.1% of Estonian residents were Estonian citizens, 8.6% were citizens of other countries and 7.3% were "citizens with undetermined citizenship". Since 1992, roughly 140,000 people have acquired Estonian citizenship by passing naturalisation exams. Estonia has also accepted quota refugees under the migrant plan agreed upon by EU member states in 2015.

Ethnic distribution in Estonia is very homogeneous at a county level; in most counties, over 90% of residents are ethnic Estonians. In contrast, in the capital city Tallinn and the urban areas of Ida-Viru county (which neighbours Russia) ethnic Estonians account for around 60% of the population and the remainder is mostly composed of Russian and Ukrainian immigrants, who mostly arrived in Estonia during the period of Soviet occupation (1944–1991), however now also includes over 62,000 (ca 6% of total population) war refugees from Ukraine who have settled in Estonia in 2022.

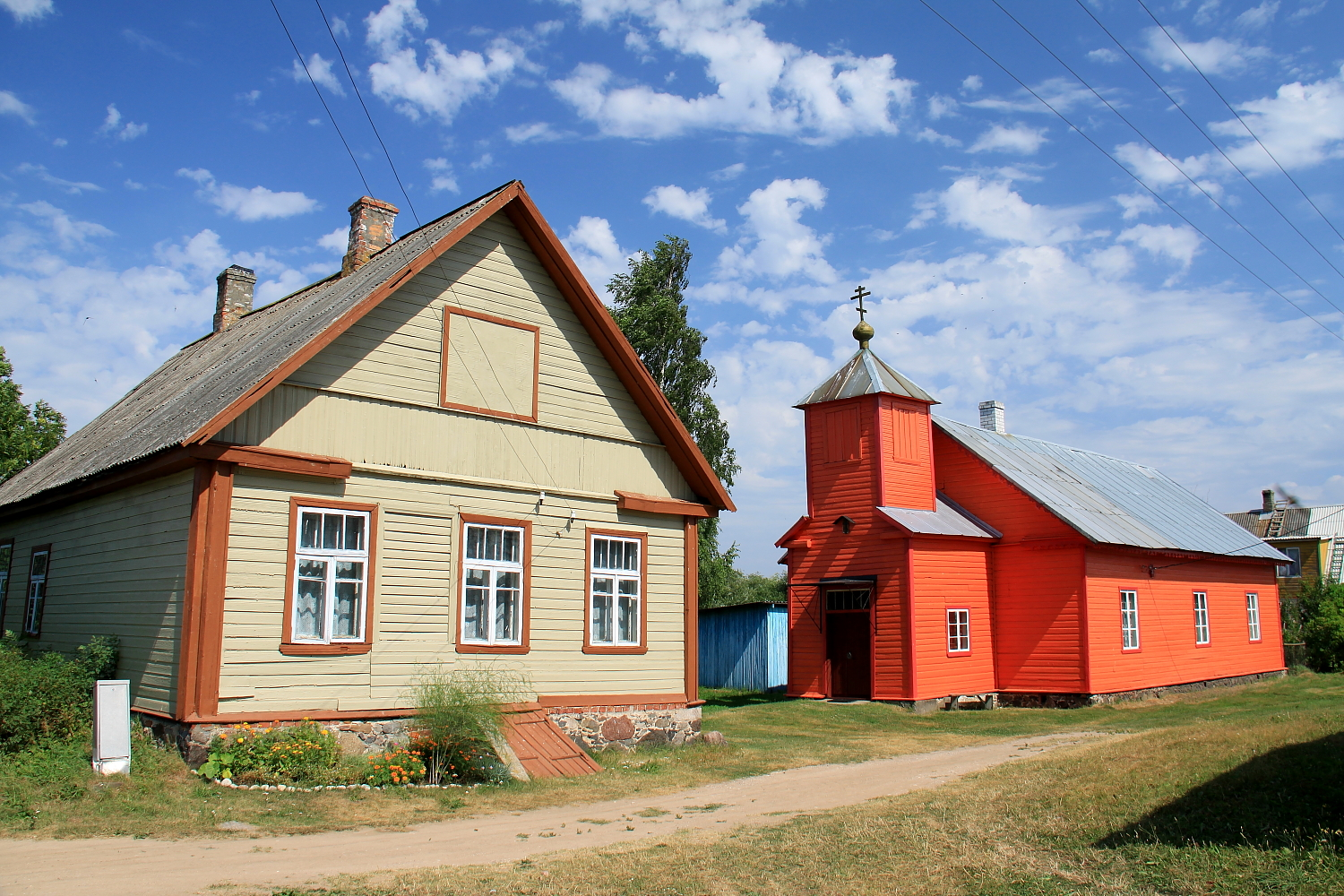
A Russian Old Believer village with a church on Piirissaar island

The 2008 United Nations Human Rights Council report called "extremely credible" the description of the citizenship policy of Estonia as "discriminatory". According to surveys, only 5% of the Russian community have considered returning to Russia in the near future. Estonian Russians have developed their own identity – more than half of the respondents recognized that Estonian Russians differ noticeably from the Russians in Russia. When compared with results from a 2000 survey, Russians had a more positive attitude toward the future.

Estonia was the first former Soviet republic to legalize civil unions for same-sex couples, with a law approved in October 2014. Political disagreements delayed adoption of the necessary implementing legislation, and same-sex couples were not able to sign cohabitation agreements until January 1, 2016.

=== Urbanization ===
Tallinn is the capital and the largest city of Estonia, and lies on the northern coast of Estonia, along the Gulf of Finland. There are 33 cities and several town-parish towns in the country. In total, there are 47 linna, with "linn" in English meaning both "cities" and "towns". More than 70% of the population lives in towns.

Largest cities and towns in Estonia 2025
Rank	Name	County	Pop.	Rank	Name	County	Pop.
1	Tallinn	Harju	456,518	11	Võru	Võru	12,024
2	Tartu	Tartu	97,304	12	Valga	Valga	11,999
3	Narva	Ida-Viru	52,495	13	Keila	Harju	11,024
4	Pärnu	Pärnu	41,529	14	Jõhvi	Ida-Viru	10,720
5	Kohtla-Järve	Ida-Viru	32,839	15	Haapsalu	Lääne	9,499
6	Viljandi	Viljandi	17,157	16	Paide	Järva	7,936
7	Maardu	Harju	16,857	17	Saue	Harju	6,217
8	Rakvere	Lääne-Viru	15,668	18	Elva	Tartu	5,622
9	Kuressaare	Saare	12,989	19	Tapa	Lääne-Viru	5,481
10	Sillamäe	Ida-Viru	12,153	20	Põlva	Põlva	5,392

=== Religion ===
Estonia has a diverse religious history, owing to influences from various neighboring societies. In recent years it has become increasingly secular, with either a plurality or a majority of the population declaring themselves nonreligious in recent censuses, followed by those who identify as religiously "undeclared". The largest minority groups are the various Christian denominations, principally Lutheran and Orthodox Christians, with very small numbers of adherents of non-Christian faiths, namely Judaism, Islam and Buddhism. Other polls suggest the country is broadly split between Christians and the non-religious / religiously undeclared.

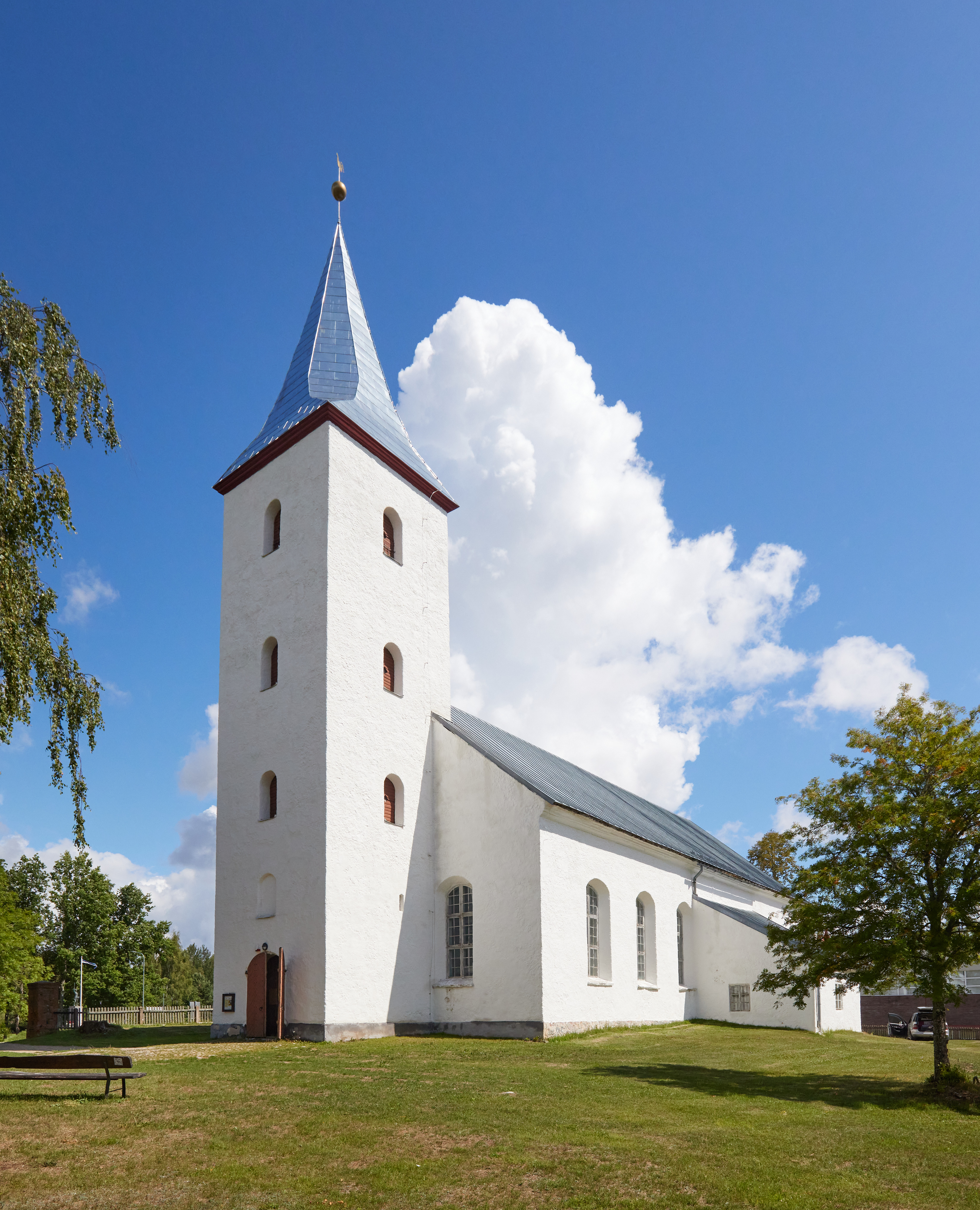
Lutheran parish church at Rõuge

Before the Second World War, Estonia was approximately 80% Protestant, overwhelmingly Lutheran.

Today, Estonia's constitution guarantees freedom of religion, separation of church and state, and individual rights to privacy of belief and religion. According to the Dentsu Communication Institute Inc, Estonia is one of the least religious countries in the world, with 75.7% of the population claiming to be irreligious. The Eurobarometer Poll 2005 found that only 16% of Estonians profess a belief in a god, the lowest belief of all countries studied. A 2009 Gallup poll found similar results, with only 16% of Estonians describing religion as "important" in their daily lives, making Estonia the most irreligious of the nations surveyed.

According to research, most Estonians fall within "spiritual but not religious" category. 57% of Estonians believe in a "higher spiritual force that guides the world" and 37% believe in reincarnation, those numbers among the highest in Europe. 84% of Estonians believe that animals have souls and 65% believe that plants have souls as well.

Polls about religiosity in the European Union in 2012 by Eurobarometer found that Christianity was the largest religion in Estonia accounting for 45% of Estonians. Eastern Orthodox were the largest Christian group in Estonia, accounting for 17% of citizens, while Protestants made up 6%, and those identifying otherwise as Christian made up 22%. Agnostic individuals were 22%, atheists 15%, and an additional 15% did not declare a response.

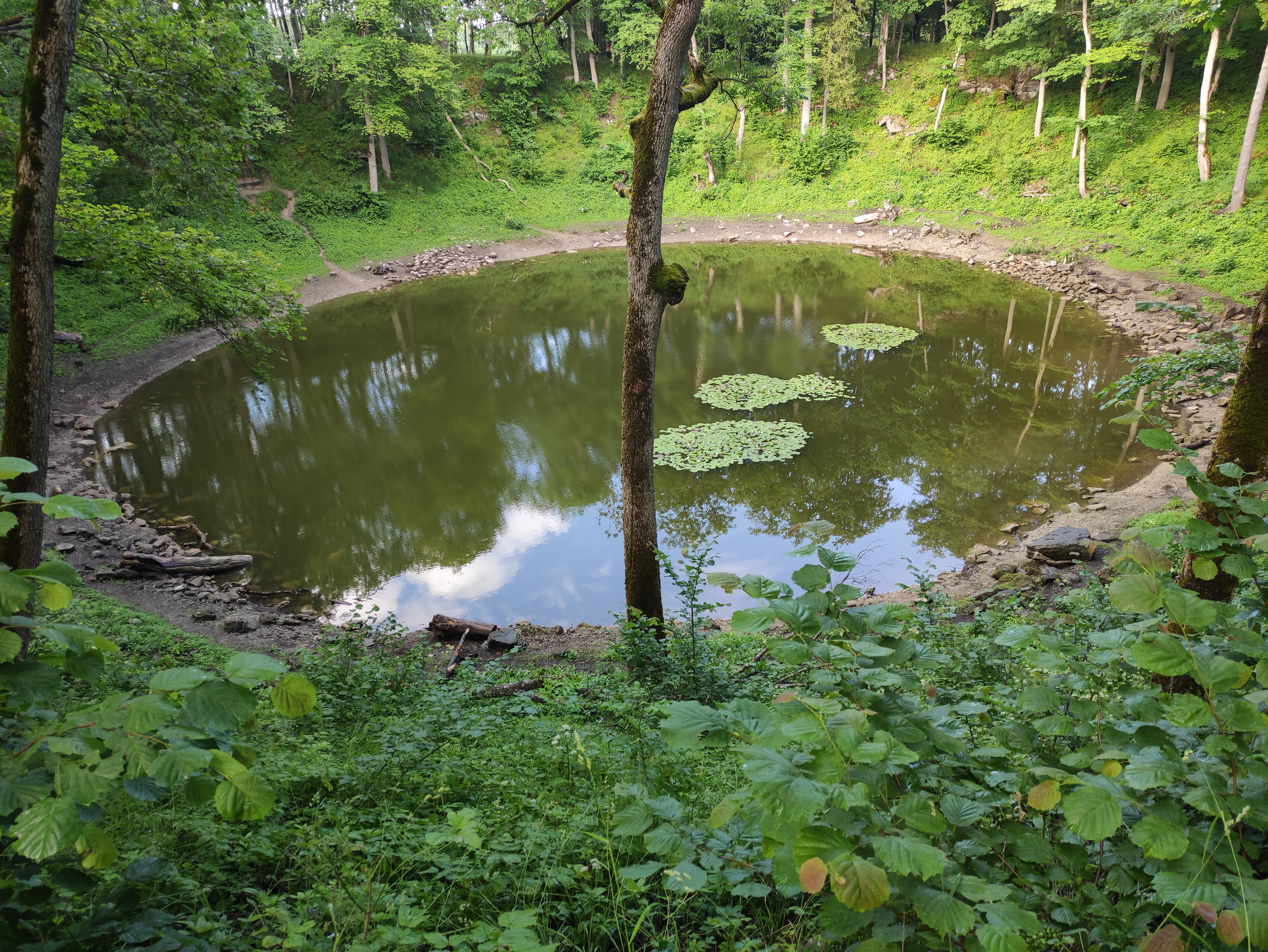
Kaali meteorite crater in Saaremaa is considered a sacred natural site by the adherents of Estonian neopaganism

A 2015 study by Pew Research Center, found that 51% of the population of Estonia declared itself to be Christian, 45% religiously unaffiliated—a category which includes atheists, agnostics and those who describe their religion as "nothing in particular", while 2% belonged to other faiths. The Christians were divided between 25% Eastern Orthodox, 20% Lutherans, 1% Catholic and 5% other Christians. Meanwhile, the religiously unaffiliated were divided between 9% as atheists, 1% as agnostics and 35% as believing in "nothing in particular".

Traditionally, the largest religious denomination in the country was Lutheranism, which was adhered to by 160,000 Estonians (or 13% of the population) according to the 2000 census, principally ethnic Estonians. According to the Lutheran World Federation, the historic Lutheran denomination has 180,000 registered members. Other organisations, such as the World Council of Churches, report that there are as many as 265,700 Estonian Lutherans. Additionally, there are between 8,000 and 9,000 members abroad. However, the 2011 census indicated that Eastern Orthodoxy had surpassed Lutheranism, accounting for 16.5% of the population (176,773 people). While not being a state church, the Lutheran church had an agreement giving preferential status to the Lutheran church until year 2023.

Eastern Orthodoxy is practised chiefly by the ethnic Russian minority, as well as by the small ethnic Estonian and Seto minority. The Estonian Orthodox Church, affiliated with the Russian Orthodox Church, is the primary Orthodox denomination. The Estonian Apostolic Orthodox Church, under the Greek-Orthodox Ecumenical Patriarchate, claims another 28,000 members.

Catholics are a small minority in Estonia. They are organised under the Latin Apostolic Administration of Estonia and two Greek Catholic parishes.

According to the census of 2000 (data in table to the right), there were about 1,000 adherents of the Taara faith or Maausk in Estonia (see Maavalla Koda). The Jewish community has an estimated population of about 1,900 (see History of the Jews in Estonia), and the Muslim community numbers just over 1,400. Around 68,000 people consider themselves atheists.

=== Languages ===
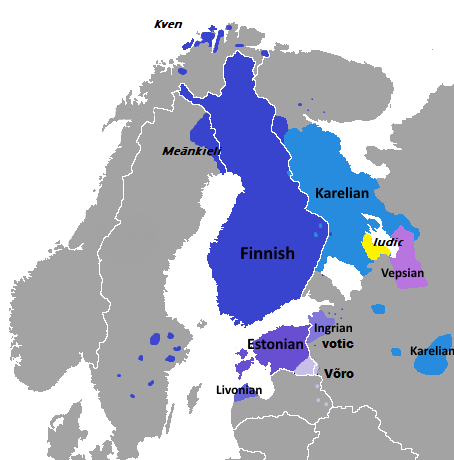
Distribution of Finnic languages in Northern Europe

The official language, Estonian, is a Finnic language, and is conventionally classified as a member of the Uralic language family, thus and one of the few languages of Europe that is not of Indo-European origin. The Estonian language is the world's second-most spoken Finnic language as well as the world's third-most spoken Uralic language (after Hungarian and Finnish).

Although the Estonian and Germanic languages are of different origins, one can identify many similar words in Estonian and German. This is primarily because the Estonian language has borrowed nearly one-third of its vocabulary from Germanic languages, mainly from Low Saxon (Middle Low German) during the period of German rule, and High German (including standard German). The percentage of Low Saxon and High German loanwords can be estimated at 22–25 percent, with Low Saxon making up about 15 percent.

South Estonian languages are spoken by 100,000 people and include the dialects of Võro and Seto. The languages are spoken in South-Eastern Estonia and are genealogically distinct from northern Estonian, but are traditionally and officially considered as dialects and "regional forms of the Estonian language", not separate language(s).

Russian is the most spoken minority language in the country. There are towns in Estonia with large concentrations of Russian speakers, and there are towns where Estonian speakers are in the minority (especially in the northeast, e.g. Narva). Russian is spoken as a secondary language by many 40- to 70-year-old ethnic Estonians because Russian was the unofficial language of the Estonian SSR from 1944 to 1990 and was taught as a compulsory second language during the Soviet era. In the period between 1990 and 1995, the Russian language was granted an official special status according to Estonian language laws. In 1995 it lost its official status. In 1998, most first- and second-generation industrial immigrants from the former Soviet Union (mainly the Russian SFSR) did not speak Estonian. However, by 2010, 64.1% of non-ethnic Estonians spoke Estonian. The latter, mostly Russian-speaking ethnic minorities, reside predominantly in the capital city of Tallinn and the industrial urban areas in Ida-Viru county.

From the 13th to the 20th century, there were Swedish-speaking communities in Estonia, particularly in the coastal areas and on the islands, which today have almost disappeared. From 1918 to 1940, when Estonia was independent, the small Swedish community was well treated. Municipalities with a Swedish majority, mainly found along the coast, used Swedish as the administrative language and Swedish-Estonian culture saw an upswing. However, most Swedish-speaking people fled to Sweden before the invasion of Estonia by the Soviet army in 1944. Only a handful of older speakers remain. Lotfitka Romani is spoken by the Roma minority in Estonia.

English is the most widely spoken foreign language in Estonia today. According to the most recent (2021) census data 76% of the population can speak a foreign language. After English, Russian is the second most widely spoken foreign language in Estonia, and in the census 17% of the native speakers of standard Estonian reported that they can also speak a dialect of Estonian. The most common foreign languages learned by Estonian students are English, Russian, German, and French. Other popular languages include Finnish, Spanish, and Swedish.

=== Education and science ===
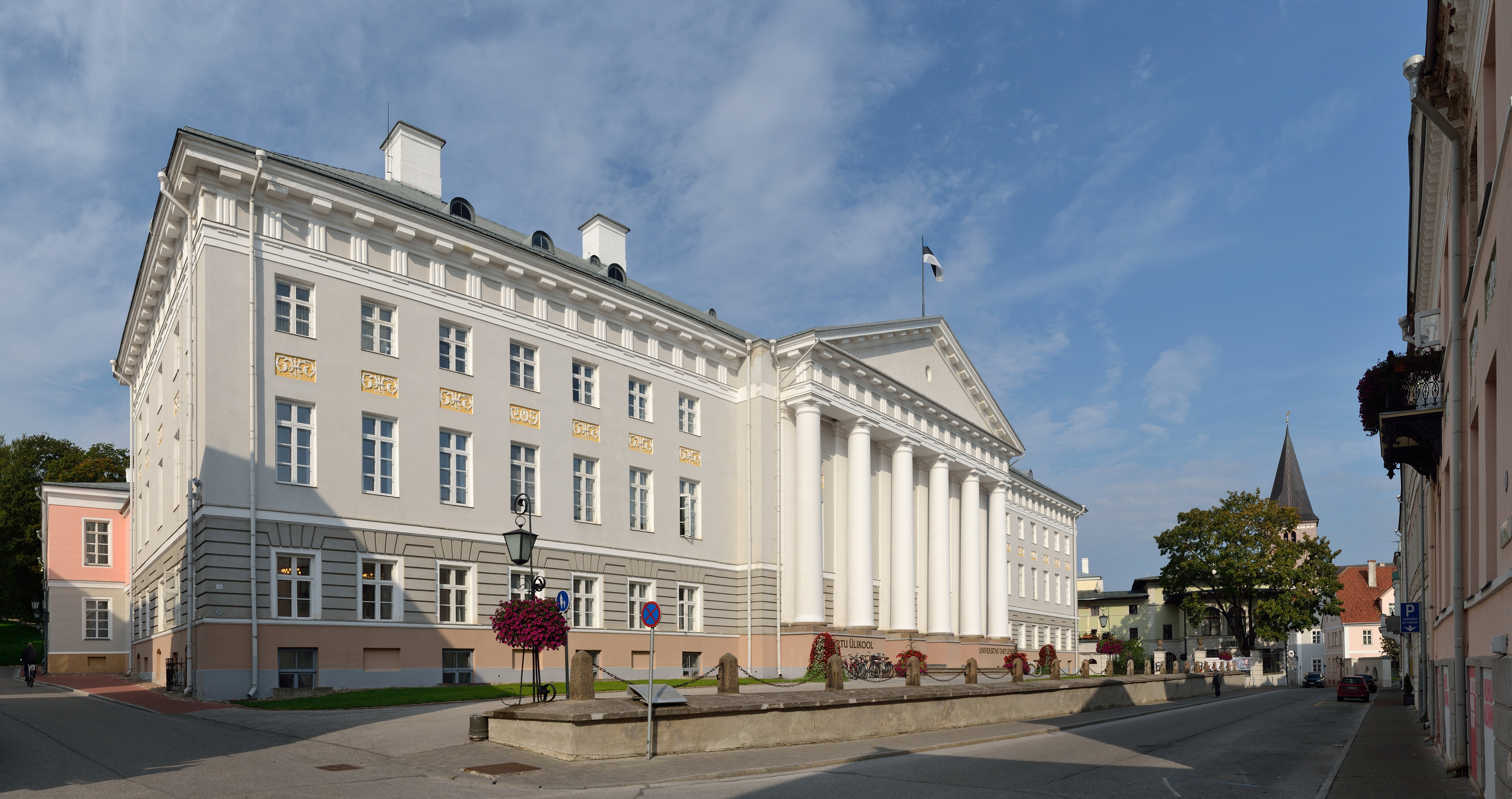
The University of Tartu is one of the oldest universities in Northern Europe and the highest-ranked university in Estonia. According to the Top Universities website, the University of Tartu ranks 285th in the QS Global World Ranking.

The history of formal education in Estonia dates back to the 13th and 14th centuries when the first monastic and cathedral schools were founded. The first primer in the Estonian language was published in 1575. The oldest university is the University of Tartu, founded by King Gustav II Adolf of Sweden in 1632. In 1919, university courses were first taught in the Estonian language. From 2024 all schools will begin to transition to educating solely in the Estonian language.

Today's education in Estonia is divided into general, vocational, and hobby. The education system is based on four levels: pre-school, basic, secondary, and higher education. A wide network of schools and supporting educational institutions have been established. The Estonian education system consists of state, municipal, public, and private institutions. There are currently (in 2009) 589 schools in Estonia.

Estonia started connecting all its schools to the Internet very early. Tiigrihüpe (Estonian for Tiger Leap) was a project undertaken by the state to heavily invest in the development and expansion of computer and network infrastructure in Estonia, with a particular emphasis on education.

In the 2018 Program for International Student Assessment (PISA) report, Estonia's students rank 1st in Europe. In the world, Estonia's students rank 5th in reading, 8th in mathematics and 4th in sciences. Additionally, around 89% of Estonian adults aged 25–64 have earned the equivalent of a high-school degree, one of the highest rates in the industrialized world.

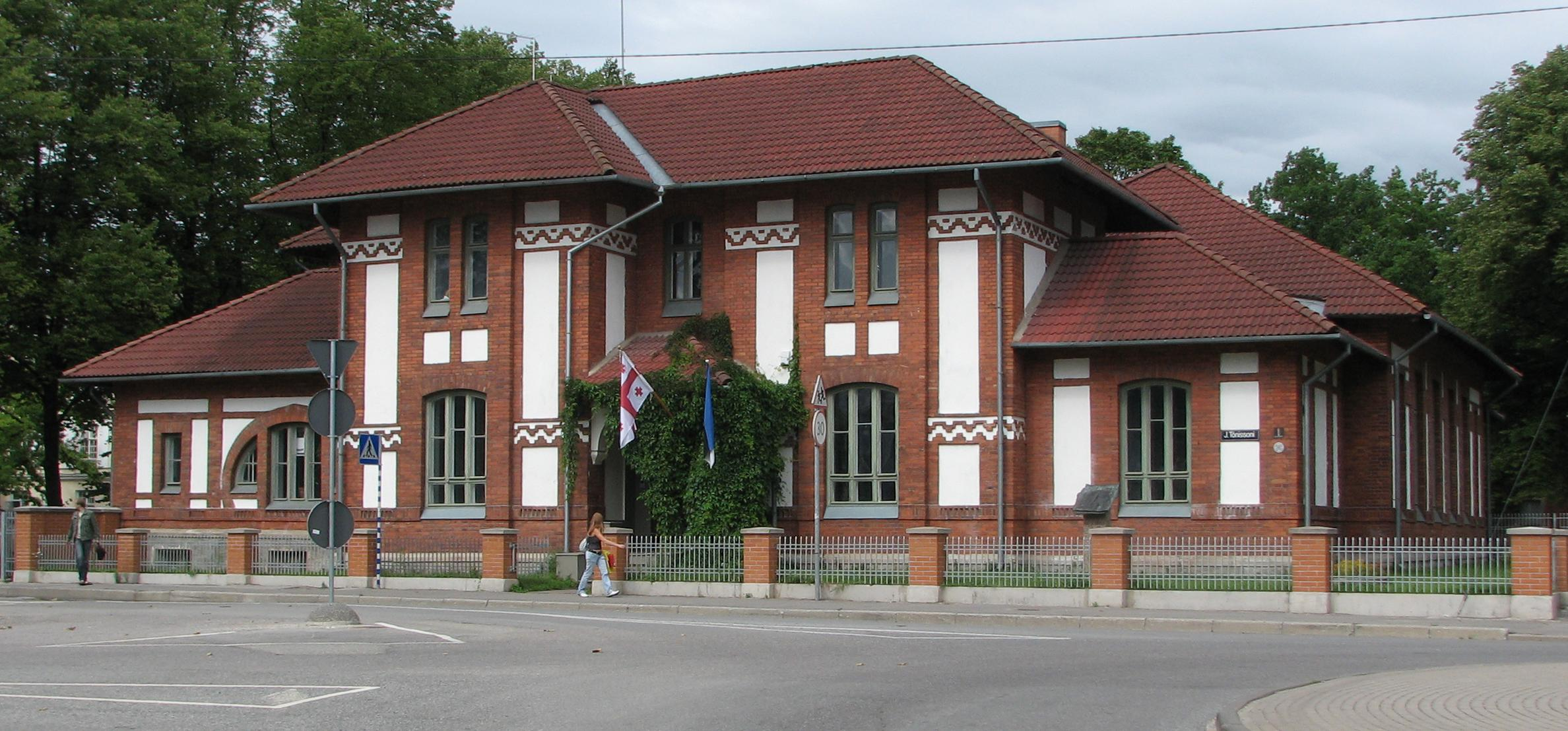
House of the Estonian Students' Society, built-in 1901–1902 in Tartu, and considered the first example of the Estonian style of urban architecture.

Academic higher education in Estonia is divided into three levels: bachelor's, master's, and doctoral studies. In some specialties, the bachelor's and master's levels are integrated into one unit. Estonian public universities have significantly more autonomy than applied higher education institutions. In addition to organizing the academic life of the university, universities can create new curricula, establish admission terms and conditions, approve the budget, approve the development plan, elect the rector, and make restricted decisions in matters concerning assets. Estonia has a moderate number of public and private universities. The largest public universities are the University of Tartu, Tallinn University of Technology, Tallinn University, Estonian University of Life Sciences, Estonian Academy of Arts; the largest private university is Estonian Business School.

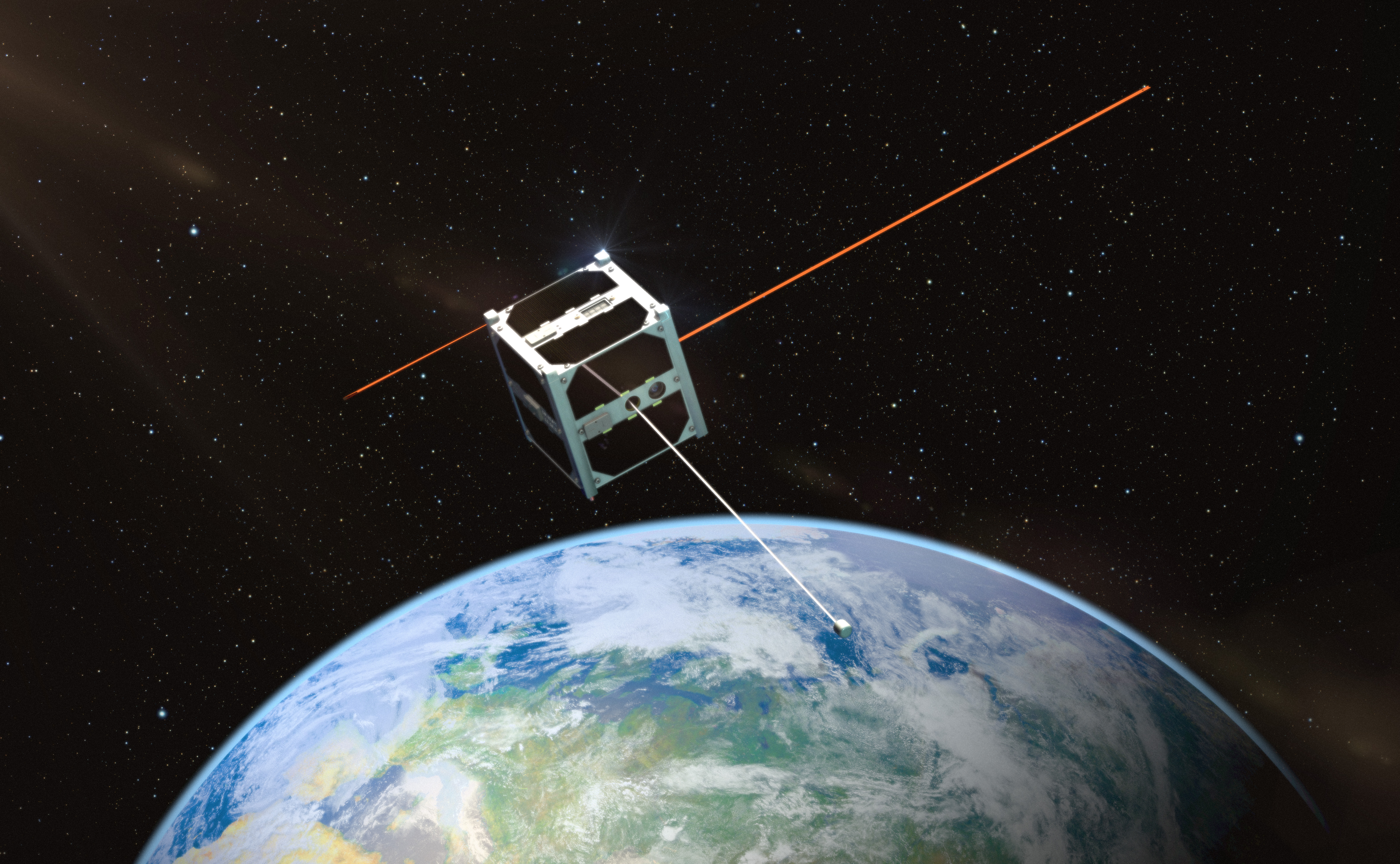
ESTCube-1 is the first Estonian satellite.

The Estonian Academy of Sciences is the national academy of science. The strongest public non-profit research institute that carries out fundamental and applied research is the National Institute of Chemical Physics and Biophysics (NICPB; Estonian KBFI). The first computer centers were established in the late 1950s in Tartu and Tallinn. Estonian specialists contributed in the development of software engineering standards for ministries of the Soviet Union during the 1980s. As of 2015, Estonia spends around 1.5% of its GDP on Research and Development, compared to an EU average of around 2.0%. Estonia was ranked 16th in the Global Innovation Index in 2024.

Some of the best-known scientists related to Estonia include astronomers Friedrich Georg Wilhelm von Struve, Ernst Öpik and Jaan Einasto, biologist Karl Ernst von Baer, Jakob von Uexküll, chemists Wilhelm Ostwald and Carl Schmidt, economist Ragnar Nurkse, mathematician Edgar Krahn, medical researchers Ludvig Puusepp and Nikolay Pirogov, physicists Georg Wilhelm Richmann and Thomas Johann Seebeck, political scientist Rein Taagepera, psychologist Endel Tulving and Risto Näätänen, semiotician Juri Lotman.

According to New Scientist, Estonia will be the first nation to provide personal genetic information services sponsored by the state. They aim to minimize and prevent future ailments for those whose genes make them extra prone to conditions like adult-onset diabetes and cardiovascular diseases. The government plans to provide lifestyle advice based on the DNA for 100,000 of its 1.3 million citizens.

Estonia is a member of the international scientific organisations CERN, ESA, and UNESCO.

== Culture ==
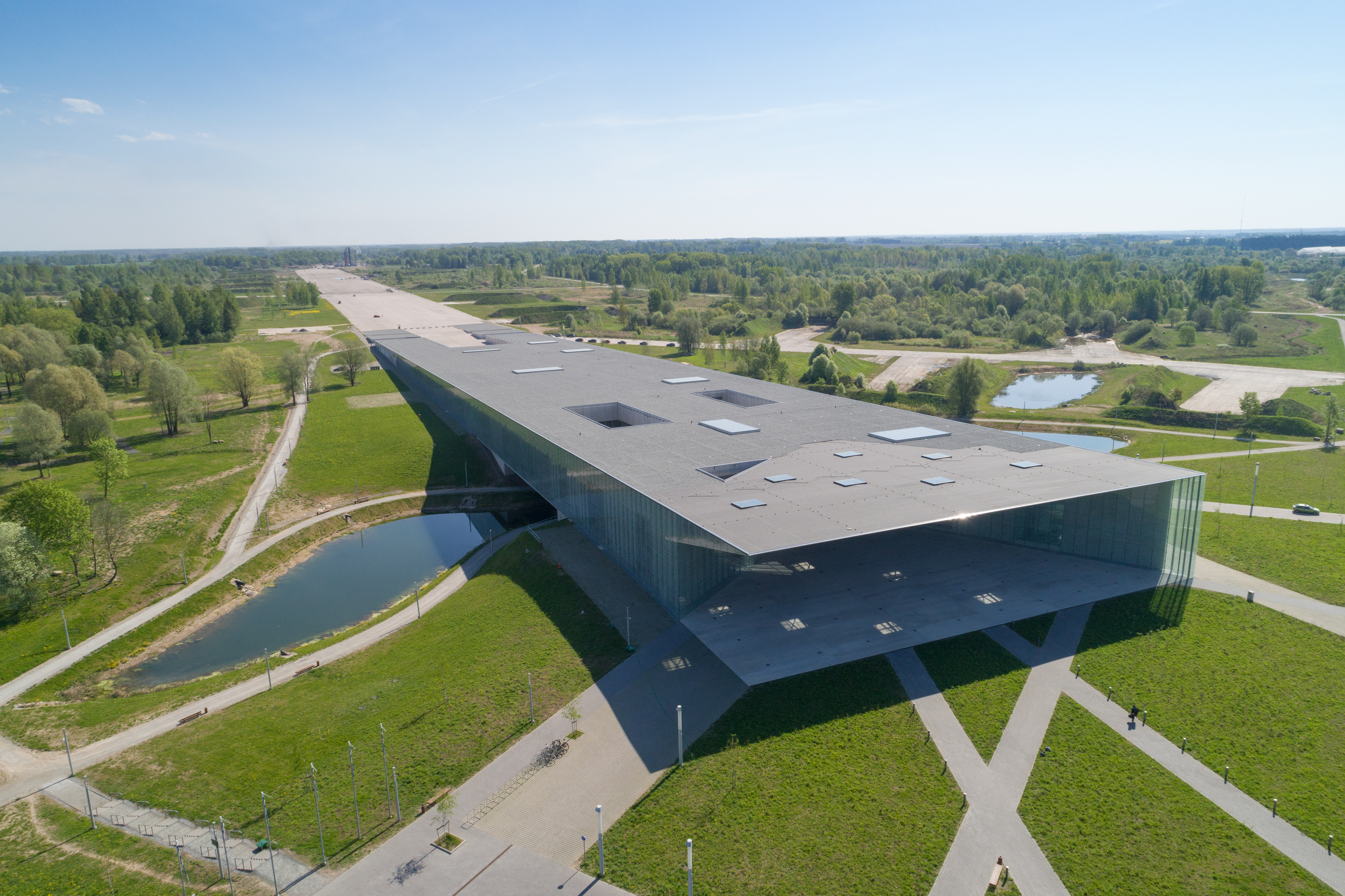
The Estonian National Museum in Tartu

The culture of Estonia incorporates indigenous heritage, as represented by the Estonian language and the sauna, with mainstream Nordic and European cultural aspects. Because of its history and geography, Estonia's culture has been influenced by the traditions of the adjacent area's various Finnic, Baltic, Slavic and Germanic peoples as well as the cultural developments in the former dominant powers Germany, Sweden and Russia, for this reason it aspires more to be considered a Nordic state.

Today, Estonian society encourages liberty and liberalism, with a popular commitment to the ideals of the limited government, discouraging centralised power and corruption. The Protestant work ethic remains a significant cultural staple, and free education is a highly prized institution. As the mainstream culture in the Nordic countries, Estonian culture can be seen to build upon the ascetic environmental realities and traditional livelihoods, a heritage of comparatively widespread egalitarianism out of practical reasons (see: Everyman's right and universal suffrage), and the ideals of closeness to nature and self-sufficiency (see: summer cottage).

The Estonian Academy of Arts (Estonian: Eesti Kunstiakadeemia, EKA) is providing higher education in art, design, architecture, media, art history and conservation while the University of Tartu Viljandi Culture Academy has an approach to popularise native culture through such curricula as native construction, native blacksmithing, native textile design, traditional handicraft and traditional music, but also jazz and church music. In 2010, there were 245 museums in Estonia whose combined collections contain more than 10 million objects.

=== Music ===
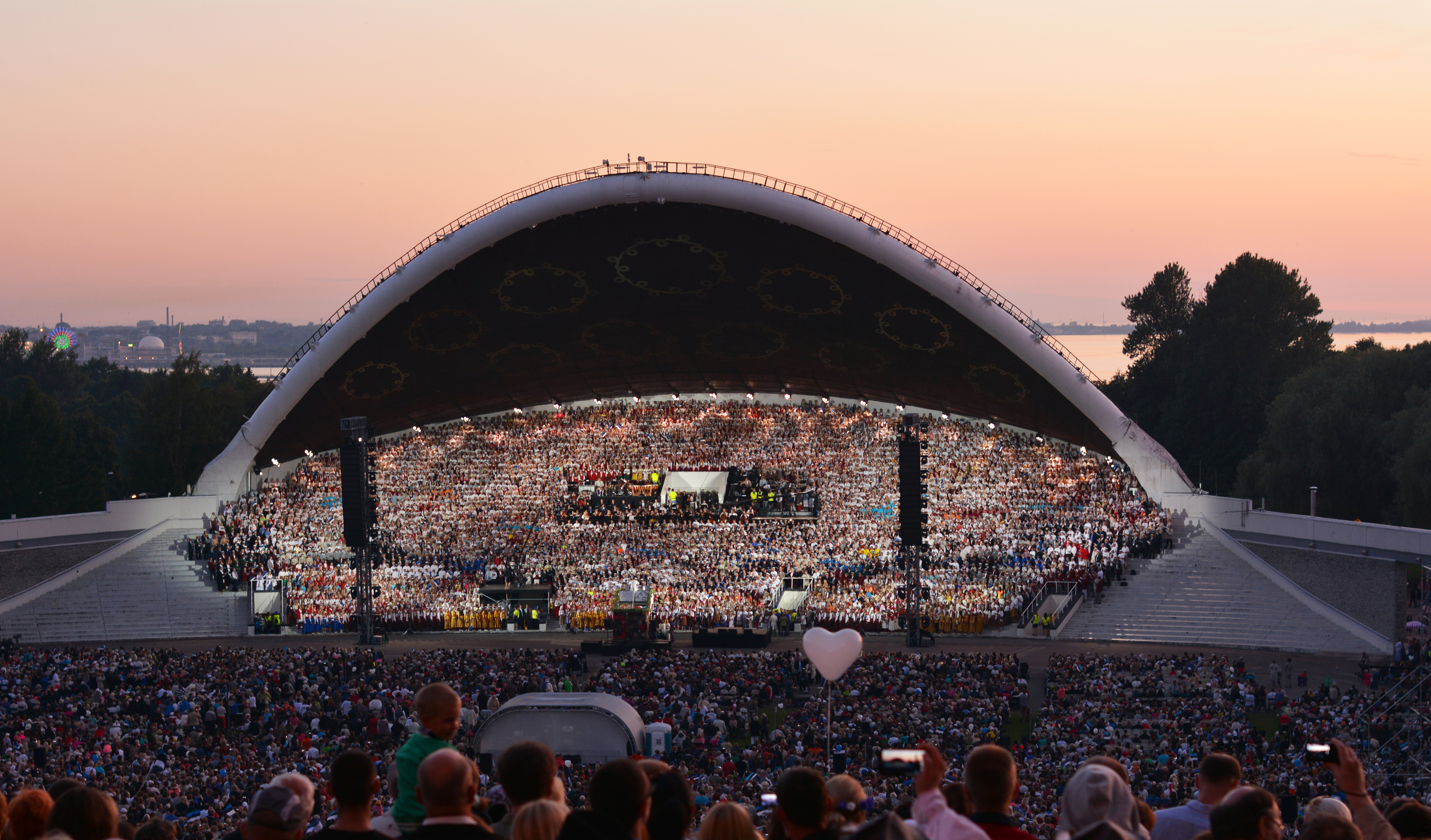
The Estonian Song Festival is UNESCO's Masterpiece of the Oral and Intangible Heritage of Humanity.

The earliest mention of Estonian singing dates back to Saxo Grammaticus Gesta Danorum (c. 1179). Saxo speaks of Estonian warriors who sang at night while waiting for a battle. The older folk songs are also referred to as regilaulud, songs in the traditional regivärss poetic metre shared by all Baltic Finns. Runic singing was widespread among Estonians until the 18th century, when rhythmic folk songs began to replace them.

Traditional wind instruments derived from those used by shepherds were once widespread, and are now becoming more commonly played once more. Other instruments, including the fiddle, zither, concertina, and accordion are used to play polka or other dance music. The kannel is a native instrument that is again becoming more popular in Estonia. A Native Music Preserving Centre was opened in 2008 in Viljandi.

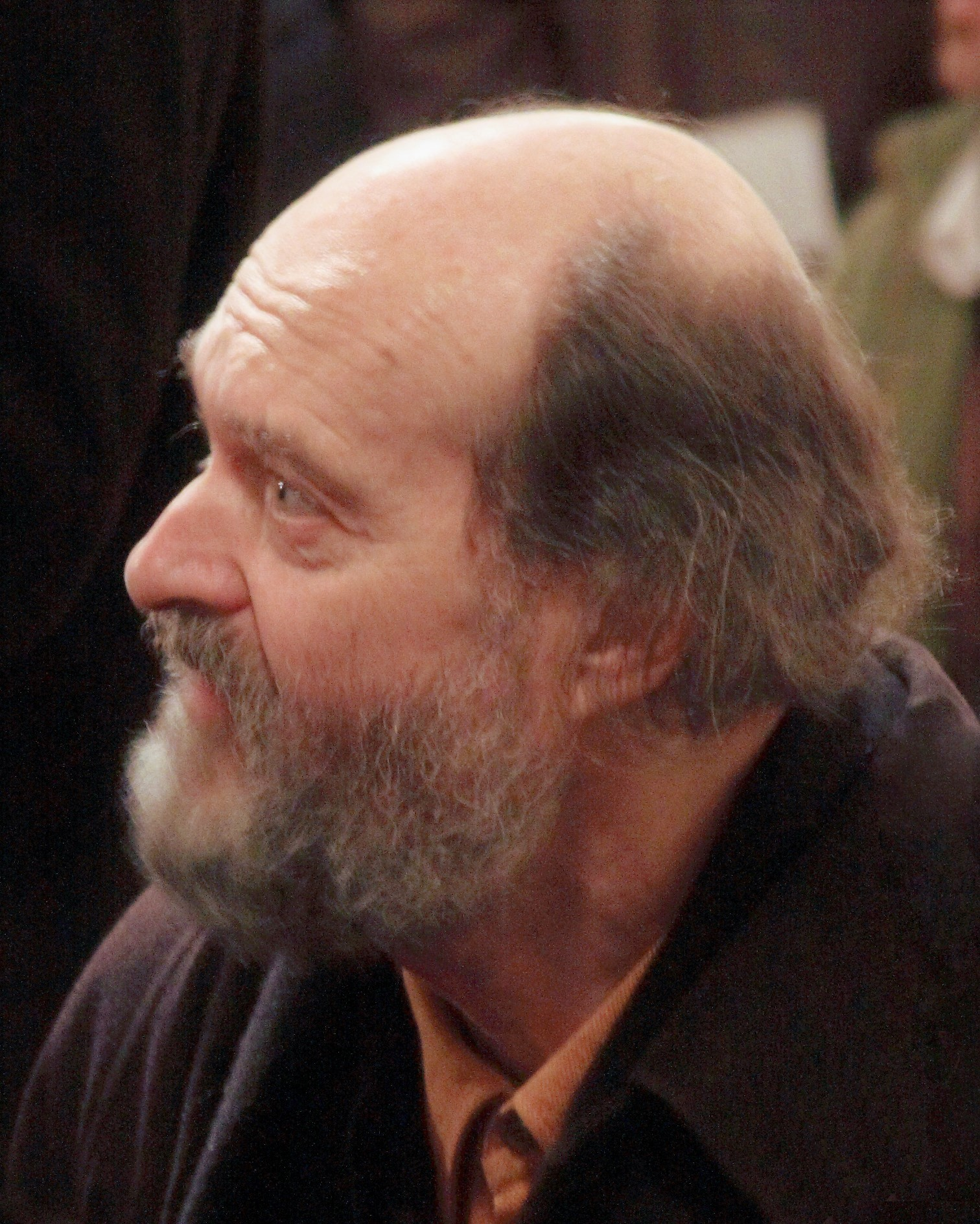
Arvo Pärt was the world's most performed living composer from 2010 to 2018.

The tradition of Estonian Song Festivals (Laulupidu) started at the height of the Estonian national awakening in 1869. Today, it is one of the largest amateur choral events in the world. In 2004, about 100,000 people participated in the Song Festival. Since 1928, the Tallinn Song Festival Grounds (Lauluväljak) have hosted the event every five years in July. The last festival took place in July 2025. In addition, Youth Song Festivals are also held every four or five years, the latest taking place in 2017.

Professional Estonian musicians and composers such as Aleksander Eduard Thomson, Rudolf Tobias, Miina Härma, Mart Saar, Artur Kapp, Juhan Aavik, Aleksander Kunileid, Artur Lemba and Heino Eller emerged in the late 19th century. Currently, the most well-known Estonian composers are Arvo Pärt, Eduard Tubin, and Veljo Tormis. In 2014, Arvo Pärt was the world's most performed living composer for the fourth year in a row.

In the 1950s, Estonian baritone Georg Ots rose to worldwide prominence. In popular music, Estonian artist Kerli Kõiv has become popular in Europe, also gaining in popularity in North America.

Estonia won the Eurovision Song Contest in 2001 with the song "Everybody" performed by Tanel Padar and Dave Benton. In 2002, Estonia hosted the event. Maarja-Liis Ilus competed for Estonia in 1996 and 1997, while Eda-Ines Etti, Koit Toome and Evelin Samuel partly owe their popularity to the song contest. Lenna Kuurmaa gained recognition in Europe performing with her band Vanilla Ninja. "Rändajad" by Urban Symphony was the first song in Estonian to chart in the UK, Belgium and Switzerland.

Estonian country guitar player Laur Joamets won a Grammy Award with the country singer Sturgill Simpson in 2017 for the Best Country Record of the year, A Sailor's Guide to Earth.

=== Art ===
Traces of Estonian artistry date back to the Stone Age, with decorated bone artefacts, amber pendants, and early figurines. During the Middle Ages, Gothic art became prominent, visible in the medieval churches of Saaremaa and exemplified by Bernt Notke's Danse Macabre in St. Nicholas Church, Tallinn. Renaissance painter Michael Sittow, trained in the Early Netherlandish style, was Estonia's first internationally recognised artist.

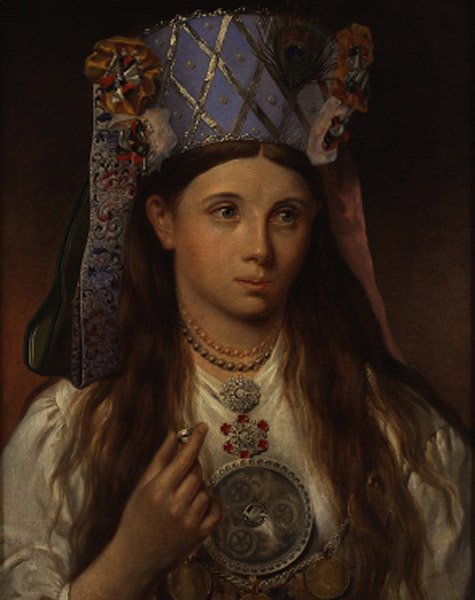
Gustav Adolf Hippius, An Estonian bride, 1852, Art Museum of Estonia, Tallinn

In the Neoclassical period, landscape painting gained prominence among Estonian artists, both at home and abroad. This era also saw the emergence of other genres like mural painting, miniature painting, glass painting, and watercolours, often featuring antique themes or Estonian nature scenes. Famous painters of this era include Gustav Adolf Hippius, Karl August Senff and Julie Wilhelmine Hagen-Schwarz. The 19th and early 20th centuries saw also a rise in national themes, led by painters like Johann Köler, who embraced Estonian landscapes and traditions. August Weizenberg is considered one of the founders of Estonian sculpture. His eclectic style, primarily based on classicism, favoured marble. Another Estonian sculptor, Amandus Adamson, shifted towards a more relaxed style that incorporated elements of realism. Anton Starkopf, a prominent sculptor of the 1930s, developed a unique style using granite and explored diverse themes, including erotic undertones. The Soviet occupation halted the progress of sculpture in the 1940s. However, since the 1960s Estonian sculpture was able to increase output and use innovative approaches again. During the 1918–1940 period, artists increasingly integrated contemporary European avant-garde influences. The founding of the Pallas Art School (1919–1940) in Tartu marked a turning point, giving rise to a generation of artists including Konrad Mägi, Nikolai Triik, Kristjan Raud, and printmaker Eduard Wiiralt, whose works captured both the avant-garde spirit and uniquely Estonian sensibilities. When the Soviet army occupied Estonia in 1944, many Estonian artists fled westwards. Under the Stalinist regime, art was heavily regulated, with Socialist Realism promoted as the official style, while Western influences were discouraged. However, by the 1960s, restrictions began to be relaxed. A breakthrough came with the formation of the ANK '64 collective, a group of artists who broke from Soviet themes and embraced personal, fantastical worlds. Leading figures such as Jüri Arrak and Tõnis Vint explored modernist aesthetics, emphasising individual expression and imaginative realism. In 1966, the first Estonian modernist art works got the official permission from the Soviet authorities to be displayed in public exhibitions. By the 1970s, Estonian art had grown distinct from Moscow's official styles, embracing a modernism that highlighted personal vision and cultural identity. Since the 1990s, Estonian art has diversified significantly with the rise of photography, video, and conceptual art. This period saw the decline of centralised art funding and management, alongside the establishment of new media centres at the Estonian Academy of Arts. Artists such as Toomas Vint became known internationally, and Estonian video artists gained exposure in venues like the São Paulo and Venice Biennales.

=== Literature ===
Estonian literature refers to literature written in the Estonian language (ca. 1 million speakers). The domination of Estonia after the Northern Crusades, from the 13th century to 1918 by Germany, Sweden, and Russia, resulted in few early literary works being written in the Estonian language. The oldest records of written Estonian date from the 13th century. Originates Livoniae in the Chronicle of Henry of Livonia contains Estonian place names, words and sentence fragments. The Liber Census Daniae (1241) contains Estonian place and family names. Many folk tales are told to this day and some have been written down and translated to make them accessible to an international readership. ABD ehk Luggemise-Ramat Lastele, an Estonian-language alphabet book by Otto Wilhelm Masing, was published in 1795.

The cultural stratum of Estonian was originally characterised by a largely lyrical form of folk poetry based on syllabic quantity. Apart from a few, albeit remarkable, exceptions, this archaic form has not been widely employed in later times. One of the most outstanding achievements in the field is the national epic Kalevipoeg. At a professional level, the traditional folk song reached its new heyday during the last quarter of the 20th century, primarily thanks to the work of composer Veljo Tormis.

Oskar Luts was the most prominent prose writer of early Estonian literature and is still widely read today, particularly his lyrical school novel Kevade (Spring). A. H. Tammsaare's social epic and psychological realist pentalogy, Truth and Justice, captured the evolution of Estonian society from a poor farmer community to an independent nation. In modern times, Jaan Kross and Jaan Kaplinski are Estonia's best-known and most-translated writers. Among the most popular writers of the late 20th and early 21st centuries are Tõnu Õnnepalu and Andrus Kivirähk, who uses elements of Estonian folklore and mythology, deforming them into the absurd and grotesque.

=== Media ===
The cinema of Estonia started in 1908 with the production of a newsreel about Swedish King Gustav V's visit to Tallinn. The first public TV broadcast in Estonia was in July 1955. Regular, live radio broadcasts began in December 1926. Deregulation in the field of electronic media has brought radical changes compared to the beginning of the 1990s. The first licences for private TV broadcasters were issued in 1992. The first private radio station went on the air in 1990.

The most internationally known Estonian films include Those Old Love Letters, The Heart of the Bear, Names in Marble, The Singing Revolution, Autumn Ball, 1944, The Fencer and November. Internationally known Estonian film actors include Lembit Ulfsak, Jaan Tätte, and Elmo Nüganen, who also known as a film director.

Estonian media sector has a large number of weekly newspapers and magazines, and Estonians have a choice of nine domestic TV channels and a host of radio stations. Estonia has been internationally recognised for its high rate of press freedom, having been ranked 3rd in the 2012 Press Freedom Index by Reporters Without Borders.

Estonia has two news agencies. The Baltic News Service (BNS), founded in 1990, is a private regional news agency covering Estonia, Latvia and Lithuania. The ETV24 is an agency owned by Eesti Rahvusringhääling which is a publicly funded radio and television organisation created on 30 June 2007 to take over the functions of the formerly separate Eesti Raadio and Eesti Televisioon under the terms of the Estonian National Broadcasting Act. According to Reporters Without Borders, in 2024, Estonia ranked 6th in the world for press freedom, right below that of the neighboring Finland (5th place). In 2023, Estonia ranked 8th in the world for press freedom.

=== Architecture ===
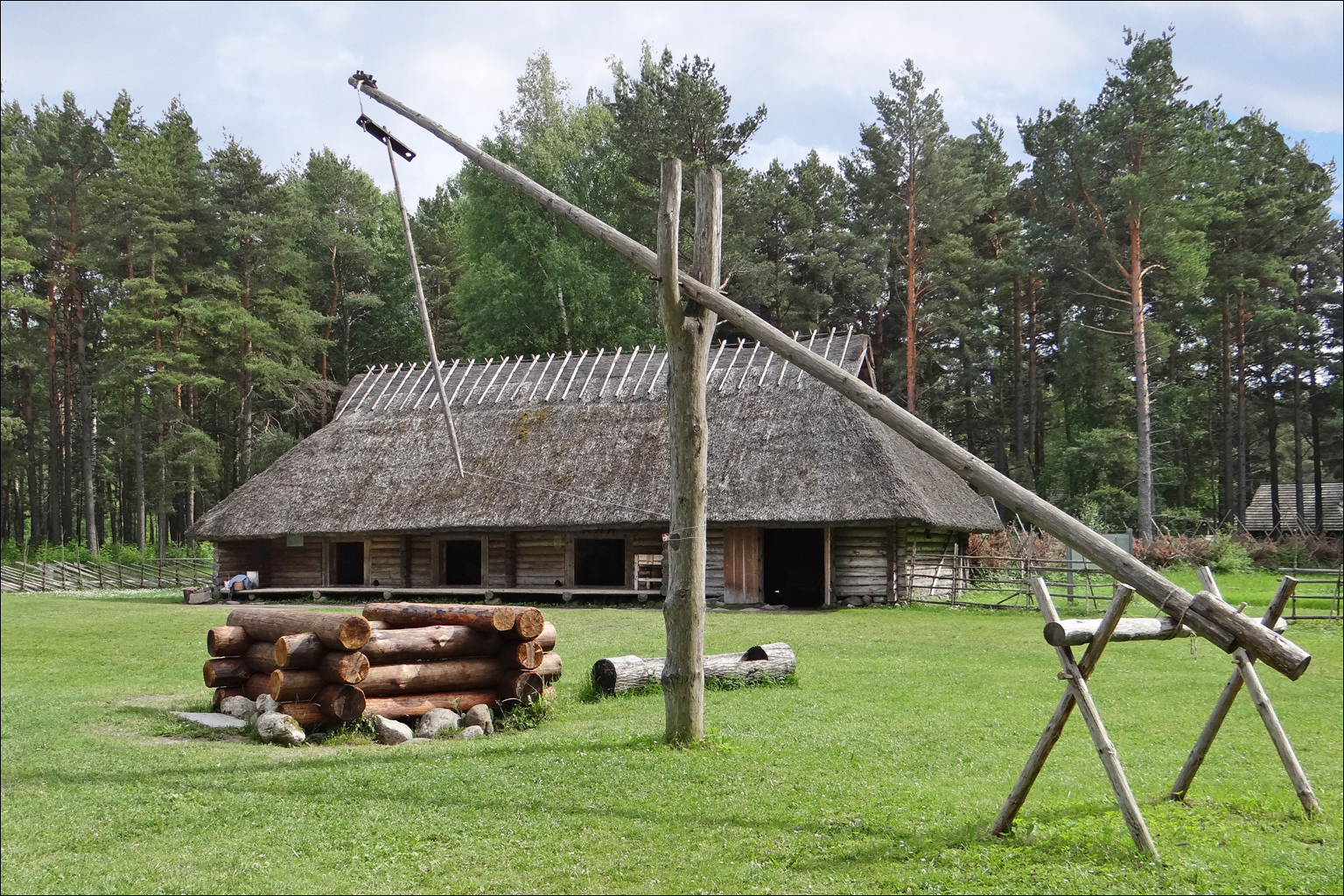
A traditional farmhouse built in the Estonian vernacular style

The architectural history of Estonia mainly reflects its contemporary development in northern Europe. Worth mentioning is especially the architectural ensemble that makes out the medieval old town of Tallinn, which is on the UNESCO World Heritage List. In addition, the country has several unique, more or less preserved hill forts dating from pre-Christian times, a large number of still intact medieval castles and churches, while the countryside is still shaped by the presence of a vast number of wooden manor houses from earlier centuries.

=== Holidays ===
The Estonian National Day is the Independence Day celebrated on 24 February, the day the Estonian Declaration of Independence was issued. As of 2013, there are 12 public holidays (which come with a day off) and 12 national holidays celebrated annually. The following are holidays that mean days off:

Date	English Name	Estonian Name	Remarks
1 January	New Year's Day	uusaasta	
24 February	Independence Day	iseseisvuspäev	National Day – celebrates the Declaration of Independence in 1918.
Moveable Friday	Good Friday	suur reede	
Moveable Sunday	Easter Sunday	ülestõusmispühade 1. püha	Commonly known as lihavõtted or munadepühad.
1 May	Spring Day	kevadpüha	
Moveable Sunday	Whit Sunday	nelipühade 1. püha	
23 June	Victory Day	Võidupüha	Celebrates the victory in the Battle of Võnnu during the Estonian War of Independence.
24 June	Saint John's Day	Jaanipäev	Jaaniõhtu is celebrated in the night before Midsummer Day.
20 August	Independence Restoration Day	taasiseseisvumispäev	Celebrates Estonia's Restoration of Independence in 1991.
24 December	Christmas Eve	jõululaupäev	
25 December	Christmas Day	esimene jõulupüha	
26 December	Second Day of Christmas	teine jõulupüha	

=== Cuisine ===
Historically, the cuisine of Estonia has been dependent on seasons and the simple food from the local farms and the sea. Today, it also includes many "global" foods. The most typical foods in modern Estonia are black bread, pork, potatoes, and dairy products. Traditionally in summer and spring, Estonians like to eat everything fresh – berries, herbs, vegetables, and everything else that comes straight from the garden. Hunting and fishing have also been very common, although currently hunting and fishing are enjoyed mostly as hobbies. Today, it is also very popular to grill outside in summer.

A cardamom-spiced bread roll with almond paste vastlakukkel is a traditional Estonian sweet roll, especially popular from Christmas to Easter.

Traditionally in winter, jams, preserves, and pickles are brought to the table. Gathering and preserving fruits, mushrooms, and vegetables for winter has always been popular, but today gathering and preserving is becoming less common because everything can be bought from stores. However, preparing food for winter is still very popular in the countryside.

=== Sports ===
After declaring independence from Russia in 1918, Estonia first competed as an independent nation at the 1920 Summer Olympics. Estonian athletes took part in the 1952–1988 Olympic Games under the Soviet flag, as the country had been occupied and annexed by the Soviet Union in 1940. The 1980 Summer Olympics Sailing regatta was held in the capital city Tallinn. After regaining independence in 1991, Estonia has participated in all Olympics. Estonia has won most of its medals in athletics, weightlifting, wrestling, and cross-country skiing. Estonia has been one of the most successful nations at the Olympics in terms of medals won per capita. Estonia's best results were being ranked 13th in the total medals' table at the 1936 Summer Olympics, and 12th at the 2006 Winter Olympics.

Estonia has many indoor and outdoor facilities dedicated to various sports branches.

Kiiking, a relatively new sport, was invented in 1993 by Ado Kosk in Estonia. Kiiking involves a modified swing in which the rider of the swing tries to go around 360 degrees.

== See also ==
- Outline of Estonia
