= Treaty of Stensby =

1238 treaty between Denmark and the Teutonic Order

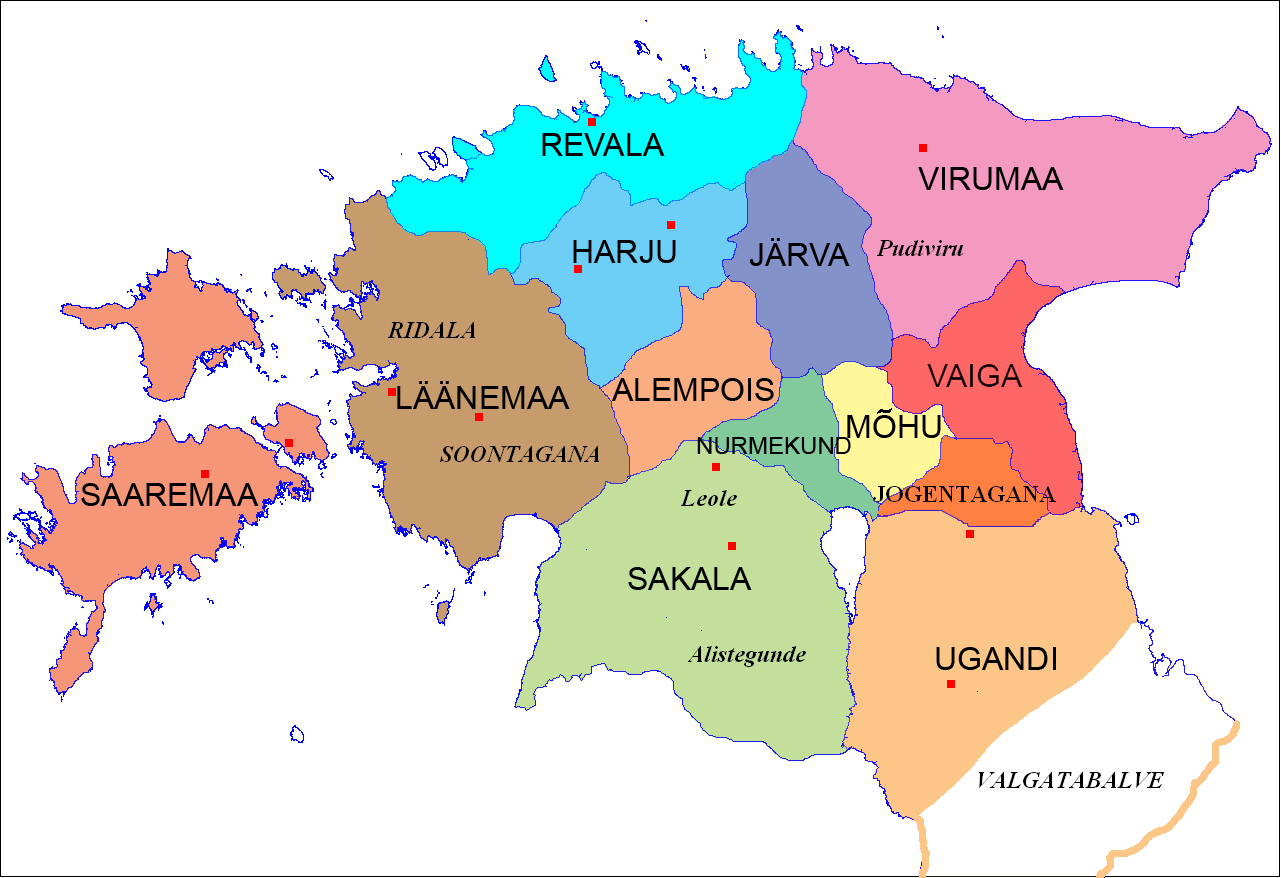
- Ancient counties of Estonia. The Treaty of Stensby returned northern Estonia to Denmark: Revala, Järva, Harju and Virumaa.
- Type: Bilateral treaty
- Context: Pope Gregory resolved that the Sword Brothers were to cede northern Estonia Denmark in 1236. However, they were incorporated into the Teutonic Order as the Livonian Order in 1237.
- Signed: 7 June 1238
- Location: Stensby
- Condition: Ratification of the Pope
- Mediators: William of Modena
- Parties: Kingdom of Denmark; State of the Teutonic Order, representing the Livonian Order

The Treaty of Stensby was an agreement between king Valdemar II of Denmark and the Teutonic Order, signed on 7 June 1238 in Stensby on the island of Zealand in Denmark, and confirmed by Innocent IV in September 1243. The arrangement transferred northern maritime Estonia to the Kingdom of Denmark in exchange for military support.

The treaty concerned the following four ancient counties of Estonia:

- Revala (Latin: Revalia; Danish: Reval; English: Reval), the area around Reval, modern-day Tallinn
- Järva (Latin: Gerwia; Danish: Gervien; English: Jerwia)
- Harju (Latin: Harria; Danish: Harrien; English: Harria)
- Virumaa (Latin: Wironia; Danish: Virland; English: Vironia)

== Background ==
From May 1223 to November 1225, Count Henry of Schwerin maintained captive King Valdemar II of Denmark and his son Valdemar the Young. During that time, Denmark lost power in the Baltic region.

In 1225, Denmark transferred the authority of Estonia to William of Modena. However, the Livonian Brothers of the Sword took possession of the territory and refused to cede. Papal legate Baldwin of Alna demanded in the summer of 1233 in the name of the pope that the Sword Brothers hand over the castle of Reval, but they again refused, and in subsequent fighting (possibly August–September 1233), they defeated Baldwin's troops. Valdemar II eventually lodged a complaint against the Sword Brothers at the Roman Curia, pleading his case to regain northern Estonia before the pope.

In February 1236, Pope Gregory IX resolved that the Livonian Sword Brothers were to cede Reval, Jerwia, Harria, and Vironia to the Danish king. In September 1236, the Livonian Sword Brothers (along with their Pskovian and other allies) were decisively defeated in the Battle of Saule against pagan Lithuanians. This hastened their reorganisation as the Livonian Order, incorporated as an autonomous branch into the Teutonic Order in May 1237. Thus weakened and with new their new Teutonic overlords seeking to consolidate their new acquisitions in the region, the former Livonian Sword Brothers finally had to compromise with the Danish kind, and renounce many of their gains over the past decade, while holding on to others.

== Treaty content and signing ==
William of Modena persuaded the Teutonic Order (identified as fratrum domus Theutonice hospitalis sancte Marie Ierosolimitani, abbreviated fratres, "brothers") to follow the papal resolution to return northern Estonia to the Danish king. The papal legate met with representatives of Denmark and the Teutonic Order in Stensby. The Teutonic Order agreed to return Revala (including Reval, modern Tallinn), Virumaa (Vironia), Järva (Jerwia) and Harju (Harria), to king Valdemar II of Denmark.

The Danish king donated Jerwia to the Teutonic Order, on condition that the Order did not build any castles in Jerwia without his consent and that the county remained in the Diocese of Reval. He also agreed to support future campaigns of the order. The future territories they were to conquer jointly from the pagans (de terris acquirendis a paganis communibus expensis regis et fratrum) were to be split between them: the Danish king was to retain two-thirds of the acquired land (optineat rex duas partes), while the Order would keep one-third (et fratres terciam).

Many centuries later, several historians have claimed that the Treaty of Stensby contained plans for an attack on Rus', meaning the Novgorod Republic and/or the Pskov Land, in order to conquer it and convert the whole region to Catholicism. However, the Treaty does not mention any of these things; it only mentions "pagans" (paganis), and forbids Christians from taking up arms against each other without papal permission. (Note: (...) ita tamen ut sine licencia et mandato domini apostolici contra christianos gladio materiali non pugnabunt. "(...) however, so that they shall not fight with the worldly sword against Christians without the permission and command of the Apostolic Lord.")

== Implementation ==
Surviving evidence suggests that the implementation of the Treaty of Stensby did not go smoothly, with papal legate William of Modena issuing 'a decree excommunicating all violators of the peace in the territory under his legation.' It also appears that former Sword Brothers rebelled against the new Teutonic Landmeister in Livland, Hermann Balk, who had to flee to Germany, where he died in spring 1239/40. According to historian Anti Selart, Danish king Valdemar II never managed to conduct the crusade against the pagans as envisioned in the Treaty. By December 1240, pope Gregory IX and bishop Uffe Thrugotsen of Lund were still making preparations for crusaders to go to Estonia, indicating that no Danish king had yet campaigned in either Votia or the Neva region. The next year, Valdemar II died and a Danish war of succession (1241–1244) broke out between his sons Erik and Abel, making launching a crusade impossible.

In September 1243, Pope Innocent IV confirmed the Treaty of Stensby.

== Bibliography ==
=== Primary sources ===
- Hedemann, Markus. "1238. 7. juni. Stensby". Diplomatarium Danicum – Tekstnet.dk (in Latin and Danish). – original Latin text of the Treaty of Stensby, with a modern Danish translation and introduction.

=== Literature ===
- Selart, Anti (2015). "Chapter 3: Livonia and Rus' in the 1230s and 1240s". Livonia, Rus' and the Baltic Crusades in the Thirteenth Century. Leiden/Boston: BRILL. pp. 127–170. doi:10.1163/9789004284753_005. ISBN 978-90-04-28475-3.
