= Battle of Lyndanisse =

1219 battle during the Livonian Crusade

Coordinates: 59°26′07″N 24°44′22″E

Battle of Lindanise
- Part of the Northern Crusades
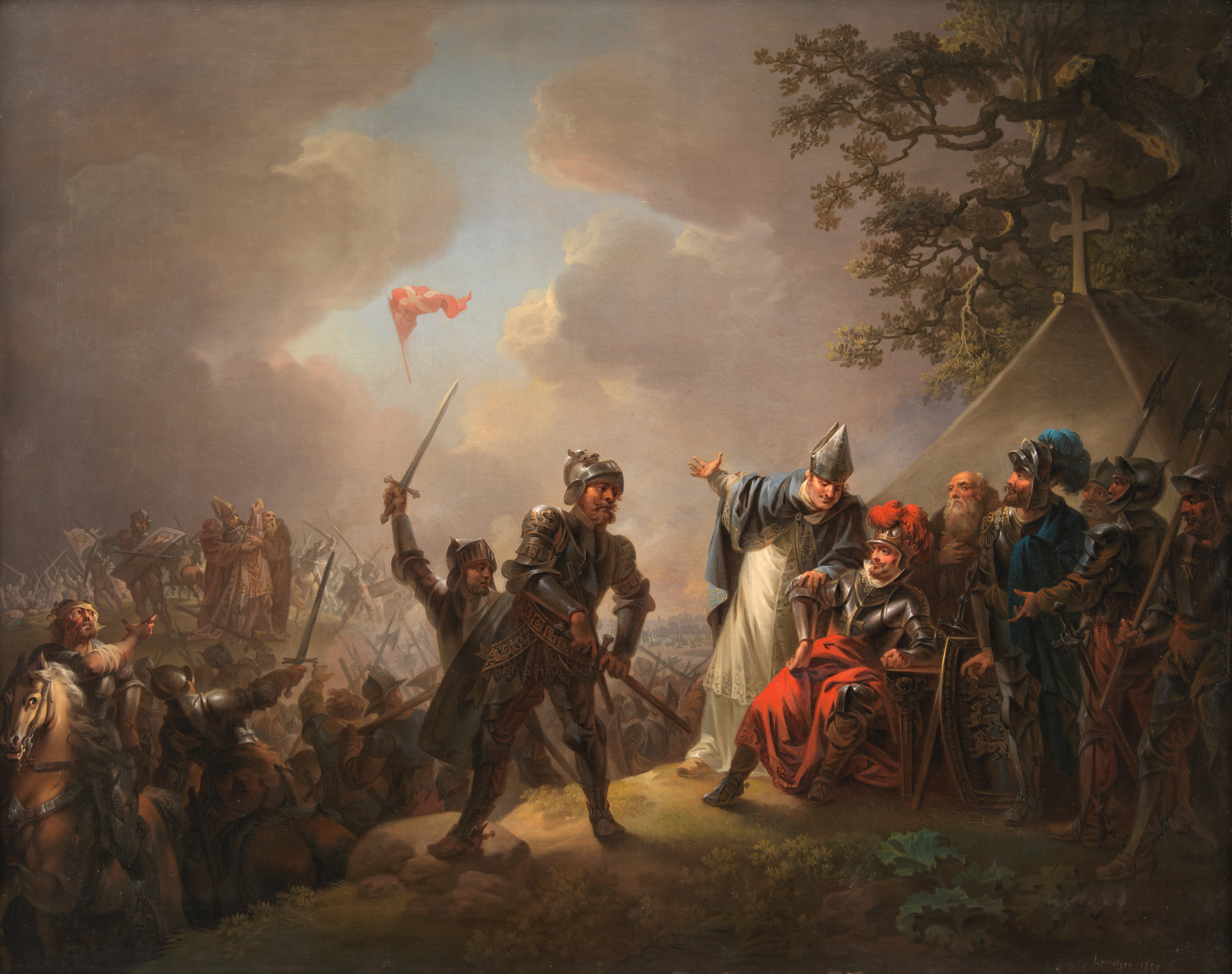
- The Dannebrog falling from the sky during the Battle of Lindanise. Painting by C.A. Lorentzen, 1809.
Date	15 June 1219
Location	Lindanise (Tallinn), Estonia
Result	Danish victory

Belligerents
Revala; Harjumaa	Denmark; Principality of Rügen; Nordalbingia

Commanders and leaders
Unknown	Valdemar II; Anders Sunesen; Witslaw of Rügen; Albert of Saxony; Theoderich von Treyden †

Strength
1,000–2,000	Unknown

Casualties and losses
Several thousand	Unknown but heavy

The Battle of Lyndanisse or Lindanise (Note: Danish: Lyndanisse, Estonian: Lindanise) was fought on 15 June 1219 during the North Crusades, between the forces of the invading Kingdom of Denmark and the local non-Christian Estonians. The Danish victory in the battle, at the site of the later Hanseatic city of Reval (now Tallinn, Estonia) helped King Valdemar II of Denmark to subsequently claim the territory of northern Estonia as his participation in the crusade into Estonia had been undertaken in response to calls from the Pope.

The 1219 Battle of Lyndanisse is still well known to this day, especially amongst Danes and Estonians, because of a popular legend about the first ever Danish flag, the Dannebrog, which allegedly fell from the sky, as an apparently helpful divine intervention, just when the Danish Crusaders were about to lose the battle to the local pagans.

== Battle ==
Valdemar II, along with Archbishop Anders Sunesen of Lund, Bishop Theoderich von Treyden, and his vassals Count Albert of Nordalbingia and Vitslav I of Rügen, sailed to the northern Estonian province of Revalia at the beginning of June 1219. The crusading army camped at Lindanise and built a castle there, named Castrum Danorum (which, according to an unattested urban legend, the indigenous Estonians thereafter started to call Taani linna, meaning "Danish castle", shortened later to Tallinn). The Estonians sent several negotiators, but they were only playing for time as they assembled an army large enough to fight the Danes.

On 15 June 1219, the Estonians attacked the Danes near the castle, right after supper time. They advanced from five different directions and completely surprised the crusaders, who fled in all directions. Bishop Theoderich von Treyden was killed by the Estonians, who thought he was the king. The Danes were saved by their Wendish vassals, as Witslaw led a quick counterattack which stopped the Estonian advance. This gave the crusaders time to regroup, and the Estonians were routed.

== Association with the Dannebrog ==
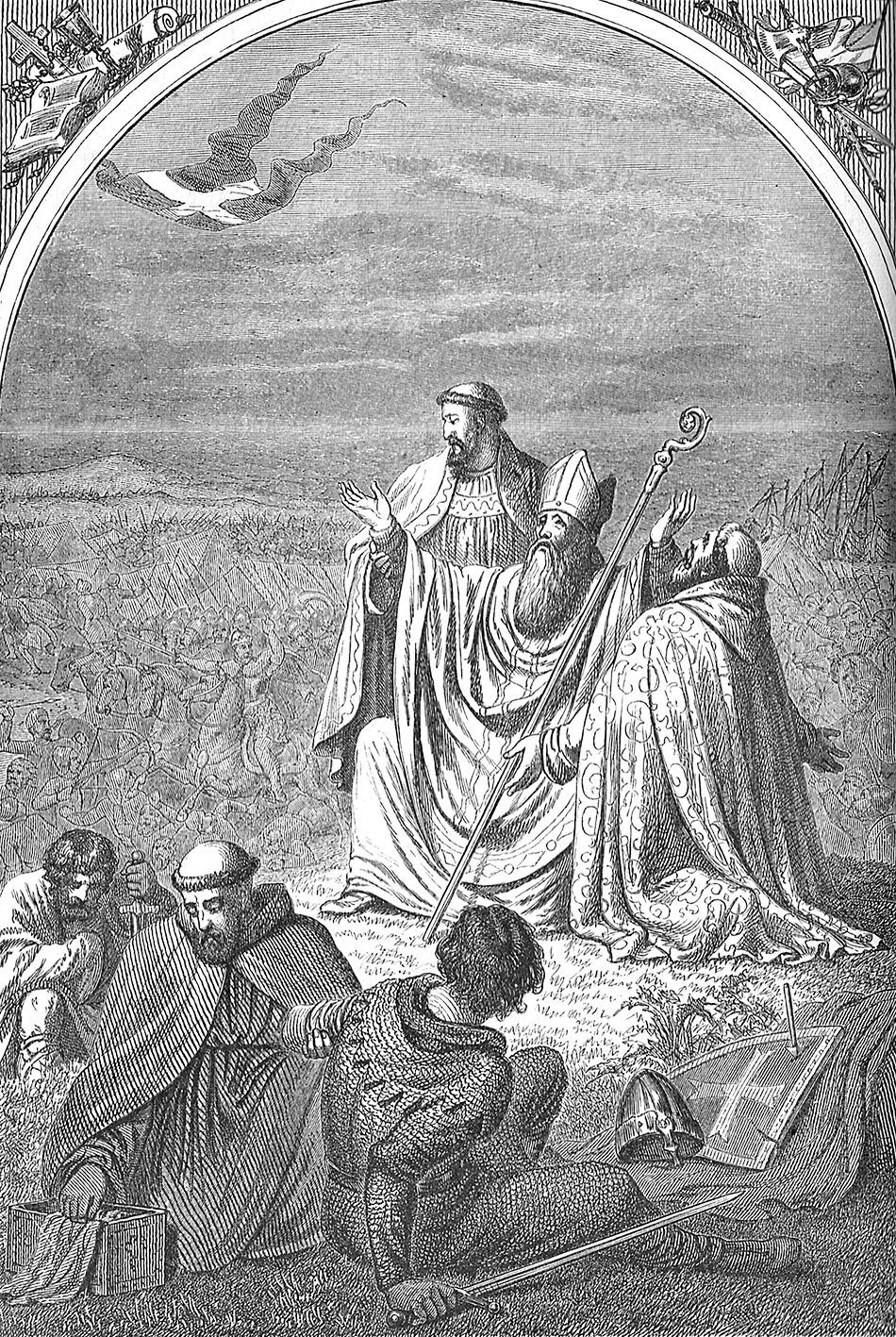
Archbishop Anders Sunesen at the Battle of Lyndanisse (illustration of Nordens Historie, 1885)

Tradition has maintained that the Danish flag appeared at the Battle of Lyndanisse on 15 June 1219. Legend holds that during the battle, in the Danes' hour of need, the Dannebrog fell from the sky and gave them renewed hope. As the Estonians attacked the Danish stronghold, the Danes were hard pressed. Anders Sunesen, the Archbishop of Lund, raised his hands to the sky in prayer, and the defenders held tight as long as his hands were raised. As Archbishop Sunesen became exhausted, he eventually had to lower his arms, and the Estonians were on the verge of victory. Then, a red flag with a white cross fell from the sky, and gave the Danes the victory.

This account builds on two different versions from the early 16th century, both based on an even older source. According to legend, Denmark received its national flag, the Dannebrog, during the battle. This legend is mentioned in the last three books (14-16) of the Gesta Danorum, which describe Danish conquests on the south shore of the Baltic Sea and the Northern Crusades. An edition of the Gesta Danorum was edited by Danish priest Christiern Pedersen, and published by Jodocus Badius on 15 March 1514.

This older source set the emergence of Dannebrog as a battle in Livonia in 1208. But the Franciscan friar Peder Olsen (c. 1527) rectified the year as 1219. The legend became affixed to the Battle of Lindanise. The legend of Dannebrog as originating in the Northern Crusades holds true, as the red flag with a white cross originated as a crusader symbol.

== See also ==
- Castrum Danorum
- Danish Estonia
- Flag of Denmark
- History of Estonia
- Livonian Crusade
- Northern Crusades
