= Duchy of Estonia (1219–1346) =

Former dominion of Denmark in Estonia

Coordinates: 59°26′N 24°45′E

Duchy of Estonia Eestimaa hertsogkond (et) Hertugdømmet Estland (da) Ducatus Estoniae (la)
- 1219–1346; 1559–1645
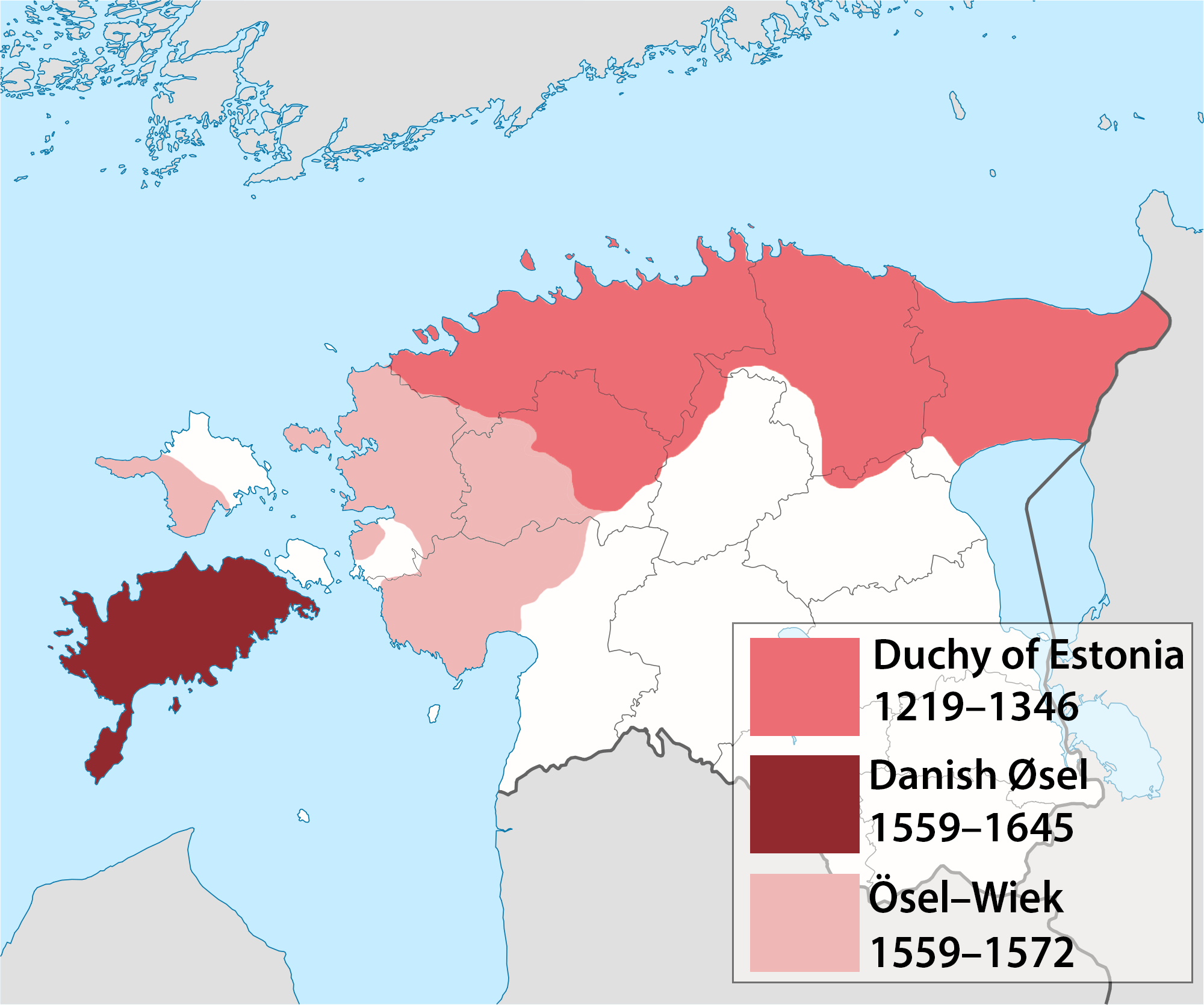
- Territories that were part of the Kingdom of Denmark from 1219 to 1645
- Status: Direct dominion of the King of Denmark
- Capital: Reval (Tallinn)
- Common languages: Danish, Estonian, Low German
- Religion: Roman Catholicism
- King of Denmark
  - 1219–1241: Valdemar II
  - 1340–1346: Valdemar IV
  - 1559–1588: Frederick II
  - 1588–1645: Christian IV
- Viceroy
  - 1344–1346: Stigot Andersson
- Governor of Øsel
  - 1562–1567: Heinrich Wulf
  - 1643–1645: Ebbe Ulfeld
- Historical era: Middle Ages
  - Established: 1219
  - Battle of Lindanise: 15 June 1219
  - Tallinn joins Hanseatic League¹: 1248
  - Disestablished: 1346
  - Danish Ösel: 1559–1645
Preceded by
Revala
Harjumaa
Virumaa
Succeeded by
State of the Teutonic Order
Swedish Estonia
- Today part of: Estonia
- ^{1} Wesenberg (Rakvere) was granted Lübeck city rights in 1302 by King Erik Menved. Narva received these rights in 1345.

The Duchy of Estonia, also known as Danish Estonia, was a direct dominion (Latin: dominium directum) of the King of Denmark from 1219 until 1346, when it was sold to the Teutonic Order and became part of the Ordensstaat.

Denmark rose as a great military and mercantile power in the 12th century. It had an interest in ending the frequent Estonian attacks that threatened its Baltic trade. Danish fleets attacked Estonia in 1170, 1194, and 1197. In 1206, King Valdemar II and archbishop Anders Sunesen led a raid on Ösel island (Saaremaa). The Kings of Denmark claimed Estonia, and this was recognised by Pope Honorius III. In 1219, the fleet of Valdemar II landed in the harbor of Lindanise (Tallinn) and defeated the local Estonians in the Battle of Lindanise. This brought northern Estonia under Danish rule until the Estonian uprising in 1343, after which the territories were taken over by the Teutonic Order. They were sold by Denmark in 1346.

== Danish conquest ==
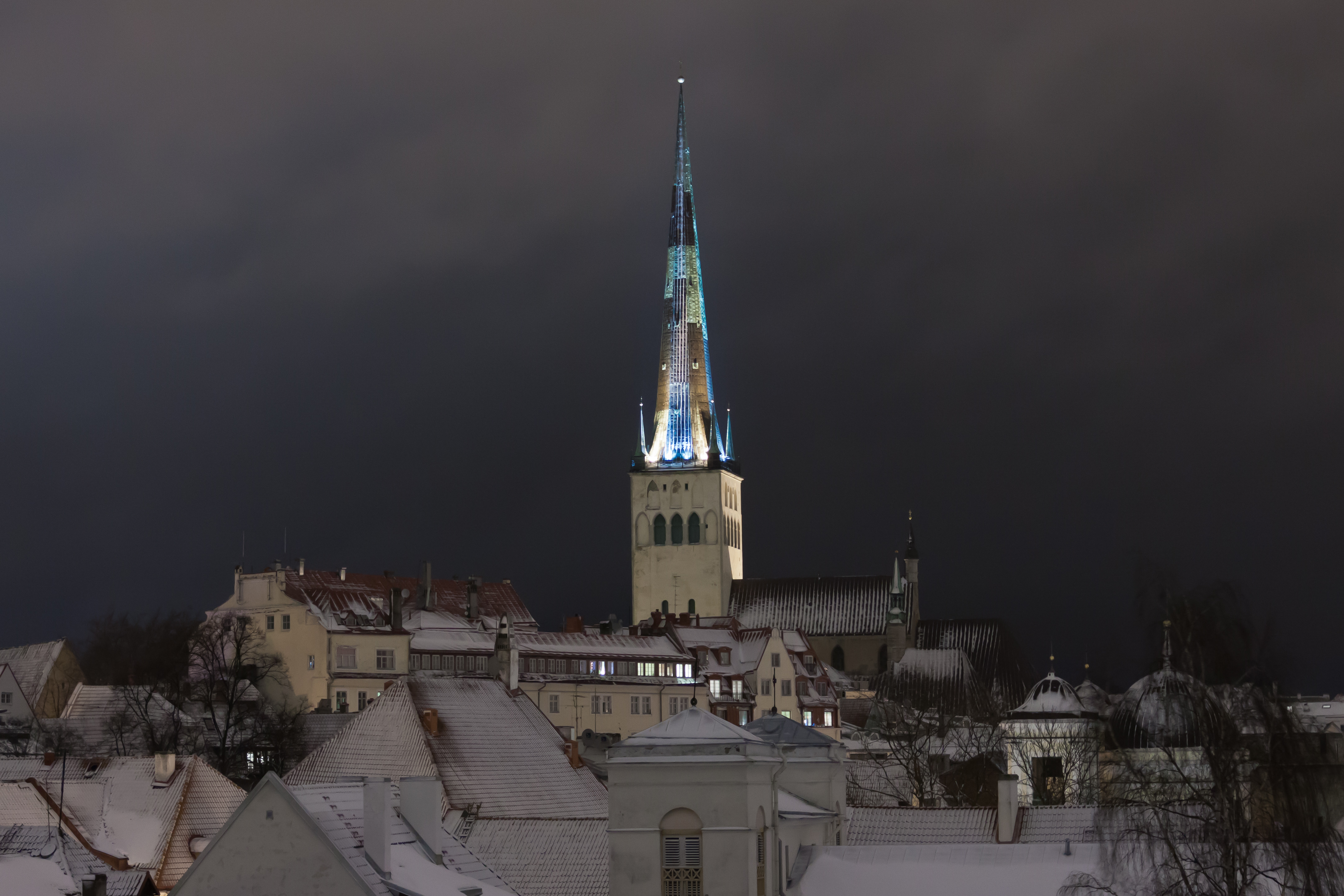
St. Olaf's Church, Tallinn was a centre for the medieval Scandinavian community in Estonia.

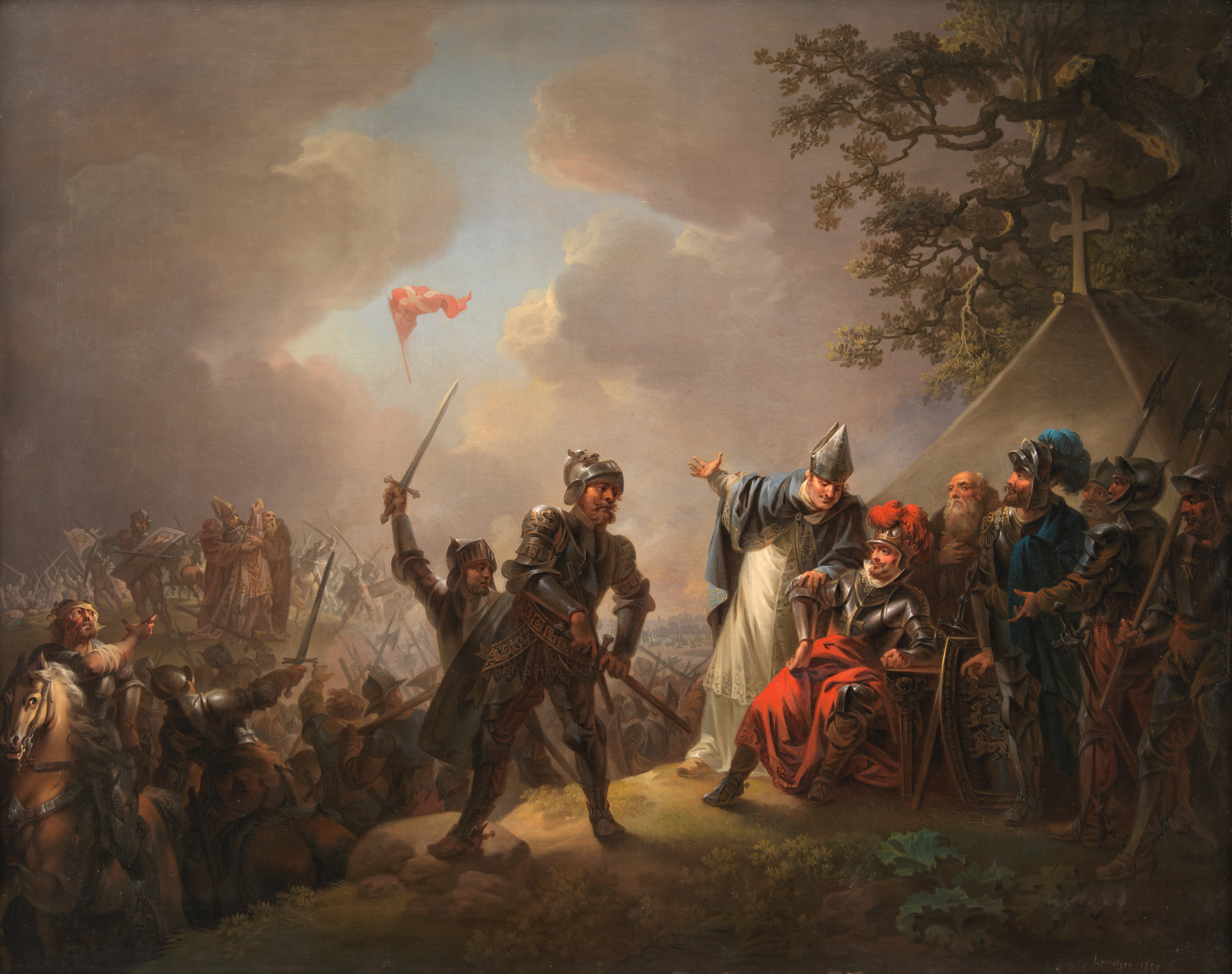
The Dannebrog falling from the sky during the Battle of Lindanise

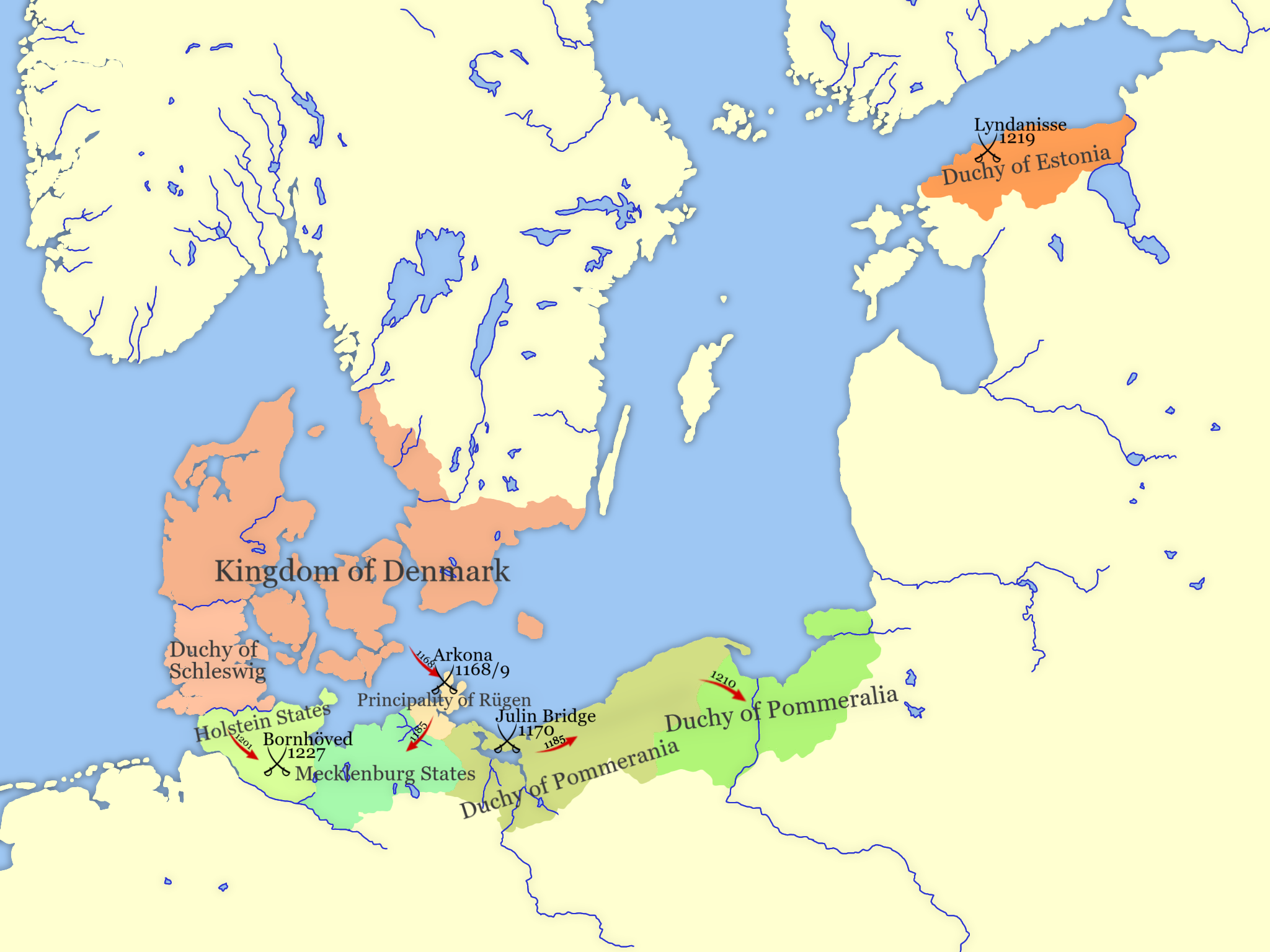
Estonia within The Danish Empire ca. 1220

During the Livonian crusade in 1218, Pope Honorius III gave Valdemar II a free hand to annex as much land as he could conquer in Estonia. Besides, Albert of Riga, the leader of the Teutonic crusaders fighting the Estonians from the south, visited the king and asked him to attack the Estonians from the north.

In 1219, Valdemar gathered his fleet, joined forces with the navy led by prince Wizlav of Rügen, and landed on the northern coast of Estonia in the Lindanise (now Tallinn) harbor in the Estonian province of Revala. According to the legend, the national flag of Denmark Dannebrog was born at this time, falling from the sky during a critical moment in the fight and helping the Danes to win the Battle of Lindanise against the Estonians. The date of the battle, 15 June, is to this day celebrated as Valdemarsdag (the national "flag day") in Denmark.

The order of Livonian Brothers of the Sword had conquered southern Estonia whilst Denmark had taken the North, and the two agreed to divide Estonia but quarreled over the exact borders. In 1220, the King of Denmark gave up his claim on the southern Estonian provinces of Sakala and Ugaunia, which had already been conquered by Brothers of the Sword. Bishop Albert ceded to Denmark the Estonian provinces of Harria, Vironia and Jerwia.

In 1227, the Livonian Brothers of the Sword conquered all Danish territories in northern Estonia. After their defeat in the Battle of Saule, the surviving members of the order merged into the Teutonic Order of Prussia in 1237. On 7 June 1238 the Teutonic Order concluded the Treaty of Stensby at a royal fortress in the south of Zealand with the Danish king, Valdemar II. Under the treaty, Jerwia stayed part of the Ordenstaat, while Harria and Vironia were ceded back to King of Denmark as his direct dominion, the Duchy of Estonia. The first Duke of Estonia had been appointed by Valdemar II in 1220, and the title was now resumed by the kings of Denmark starting in 1269.

Due to its status as the king's personal dominion, the Duchy of Estonia was included in a nationwide Danish taxation list Liber Census Daniæ (Danish: Valdemar Sejrs Jordebog) (1220–41), an important geographic and historic document. The list contains about 500 Estonian place names and the names of 114 local vassals.

The capital of Danish Estonia was Reval (Tallinn), founded at the place of Lindanise after the invasion of 1219. The Danes built the fortress of Castrum Danorum at Toompea Hill. Estonians still call their capital "Tallinn", which, according to an urban legend, derives from Taani linna (Danish town or castle). Reval was granted Lübeck city rights (1248) and joined the Hanseatic League. Even today, Danish influence can be seen in heraldic symbols: the city of Tallinn's coat of arms features the Danish cross, while coat of arms of Estonia depicts three lions, similar to the coat of arms of Denmark.

In 1240, Valdemar II created the Bishopric of Reval but, contrary to canon law, reserved the right to appoint the bishops of Reval to himself and his successors as king of Denmark. The decision to simply nominate the See of Reval was unique in the whole Catholic Church at the time and was disputed by bishops and the Pope. During this period, the election of bishops was never established in Reval, and royal rights over the bishopric and to nominate the bishops were even included in the treaty when the territories were sold to Teutonic Order in 1346.

First mentioned in 1240, the duchy was locally governed by a viceroy (Latin: capitaneus) appointed by the king and functioning as his plenipotentiary. The viceroy had administrative powers, he collected the taxes, and he commanded the vassals and the troops in case of war. Most of the viceroys were either of Danish or Danish-Estonian nationality.

In Vironia, the main power centers were Wesenberg (Rakvere) and Narva, built on the site of the old Estonian fortresses of Rakovor and Rugodiv. Wesenberg was granted Lübeck city rights in 1302 by King Erik Menved. Narva received these rights in 1345.

The vassals of the Danish king received fiefs per dominum utile in exchange for military and court services. The vassals' oath to a new king had to be sworn for a "year and a day". One researcher has estimated that 80% of the vassals were Germans from Westphalia, 18% were probably Danes, and only 2% had distinctly Estonian names (Clemens Esto, Otto Kivele, Odwardus Sorseferæ, etc.). The chronicler Ditleb Alnpeke (1290) complained that the king of Denmark was accepting Estonians as his vassals. Danish rule was more liberal in this respect than that of the Brothers of the Sword, in whose territories no natives were allowed to become lords of fiefs. In 1248, the vassals and burgers of Reval already had a local legislative body or ritterschaft.

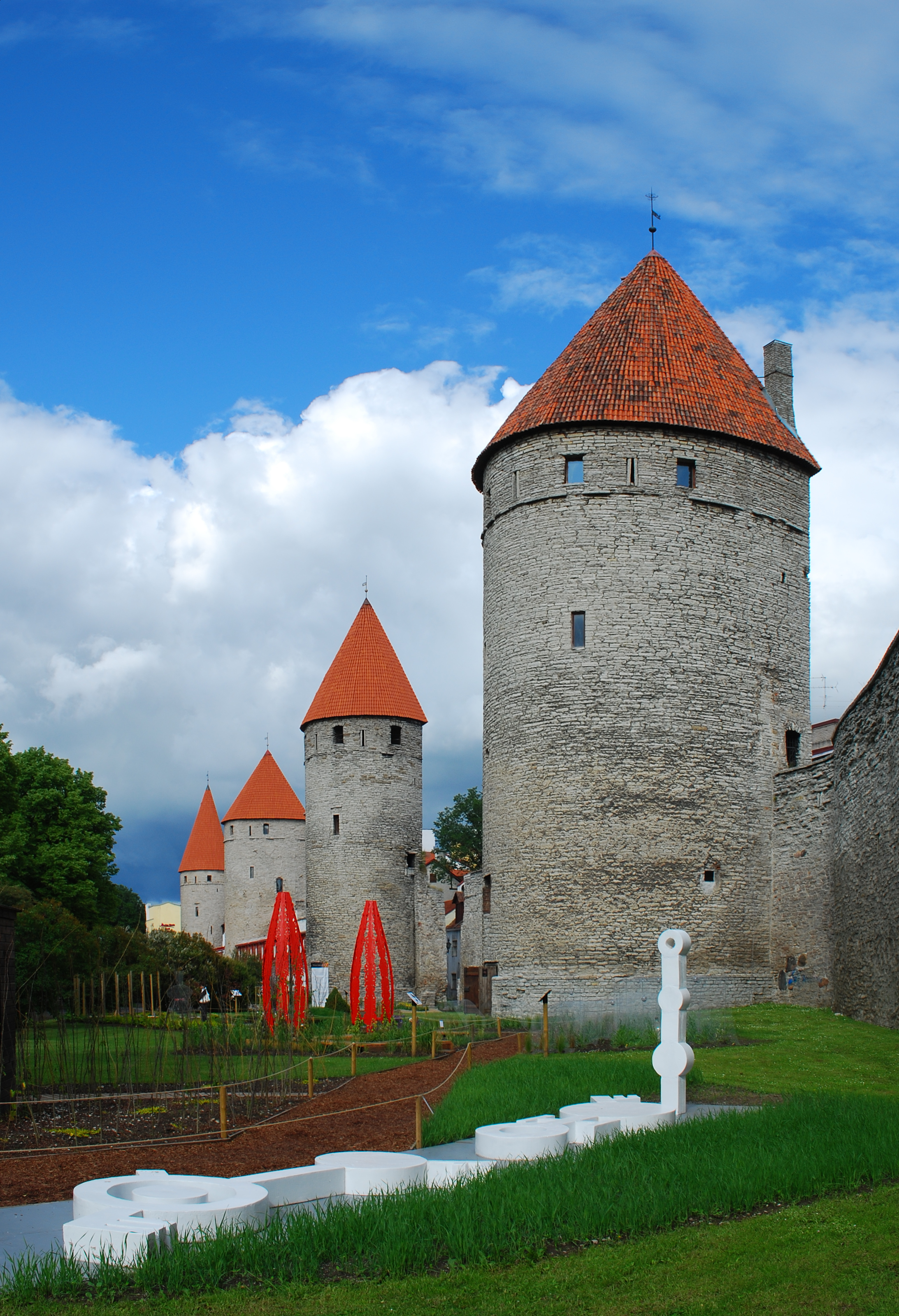
The Walls of Tallinn were started by Queen Margrethe

The Danish army only visited the province occasionally. In 1240–42, Denmark went to war against Novgorod and tried to extend its rule to the land of Votians. King Valdemar sent his sons Abel and Canute to support his vassals' campaign, but they did not win any new territory. The Danish king Erik Plogpennig visited Estonia in 1249, and the Danish fleet sailed to Reval in 1268 and 1270 against Novgorodian and Lithuanian threats.

In August 1332, King Christopher II of Denmark died, and Denmark fell into political turmoil. The province in Estonia became split between a pro-Danish party led by Bishop of Reval, Olaf of Roskilde, and the pro-German party led by captain Marquard Breide. After the Estonians of Harria rebelled in the St. George's Night Uprising of 1343, the Teutonic Order occupied the territories. The overthrow of the Danish government came two days after the Order had put down the Estonian revolt, and the Danish viceroy was imprisoned in cooperation with the pro-German vassals. The castles in Reval and Wesenberg were handed over to the Order by the pro-German party on 16 May 1343, and the castle at Narva in 1345. In 1346, Estonia (Harria and Vironia) was sold for 19,000 Cologne marks to the Teutonic Order, notwithstanding the promise by Christopher II in 1329 never to abandon or sell Denmark's Estonian territories. The king of Denmark even made a public statement repenting breaking that promise and asking forgiveness from the Pope. The shift of sovereignty from Denmark to the Teutonic Order took place on 1 November 1346.

=== List of Viceroys ===
- ? (1240–1248)
- Saxo Aginsun (1248–49)
- Stigot Agison (1249)
- Saxo (1254–57)
- Jakob Ramessun (1259)
- Woghen Palissun (1266)
- Siverith (1270)
- Eilard von Oberch (1275–1279)
- Odewart Lode (1279–1281)
- Letgast (1285)
- Friedrich Moltike (1287)
- Johann Sialanzfar (1288)
- Nils Axelsson (1296)
- Nikolaus Ubbison (1298)
- Johann Saxesson (1304)
- Johannes Canne (1310)
- Ago Saxisson (1312–1313)
- Heinrich Bernauer (1313–1314)
- Johannes Kanna (1323)
- Heinrich Spliit (1329)
- Marquard Breide (1332–1335)
- Konrad Preen (1340 – May 1343)
- Bertram von Parembeke (1343)
- Stigot Andersson (1344–1346)

== Later rulers and Danish Ösel ==
The title of "Duke of Estonia" which had been held by the kings of Denmark was not used by any subsequent rulers of the Teutonic Order. The title was revived only in 1456 by the Danish King Christian I. In 1561, it was assumed by the King of Sweden as he had gained control of Reval and northern Estonia. After the Russian conquest of Estonia during the Great Northern War (1700–1721), the title of the Duke of Estonia was transferred to the Emperor of Russia. It continued to be a subsidiary title of emperors until the Romanov dynasty was overthrown in 1917.

In 1559, during the Livonian war, Frederick II of Denmark bought the Bishopric of Ösel-Wiek from Prince-Bishop Johannes V von Münchhausen for 30,000 thalers. The possession was given as an appanage to Magnus, Duke of Holstein, the brother of Frederick II, who landed on Ösel (Saaremaa) with an army in 1560. Denmark ceded Wiek (Läänemaa) to the Polish-Lithuanian Union in exchange for Livonian possessions in Ösel. In 1572, Ösel was transferred to direct administration by Denmark. In 1645, it was ceded from Denmark to Sweden by the Treaty of Brömsebro.

=== Governors of Ösel ===
- Heinrich Wulf (5 March 1562 – 1567)
- Klaus von Ungern zu Dalby (May 1573 – August 1576)
- Johann von Mentz (2 September 1576 – 1584)
- Mathias Budde (1584–1587)
- Claes Maltesen Sehested (2 February 1599 – 1612)
- Nils Kraggen (1612–15)
- Jakob Wacke (1615–35)
- Anders Bille (1635–43)
- Ebbe Ulfeld (1643–45)

== See also ==
- First, Second and Third Swedish crusades
- History of Denmark
- History of Estonia
- History of Finland
- Northern Crusades
- Swedish Estonia

== Sources ==
- Skyum-Nielsen, Niels (1981). Danish Medieval History & Saxo Grammaticus. Museum Tusculanum Press. ISBN 87-88073-30-0.
- Christiansen, Eric (1997). The Northern Crusades. Penguin. ISBN 0-14-026653-4.
