= Revala =

Ancient county of Estonia

Revalia Revala
- County of Ancient Estonia
- 9th century–1224
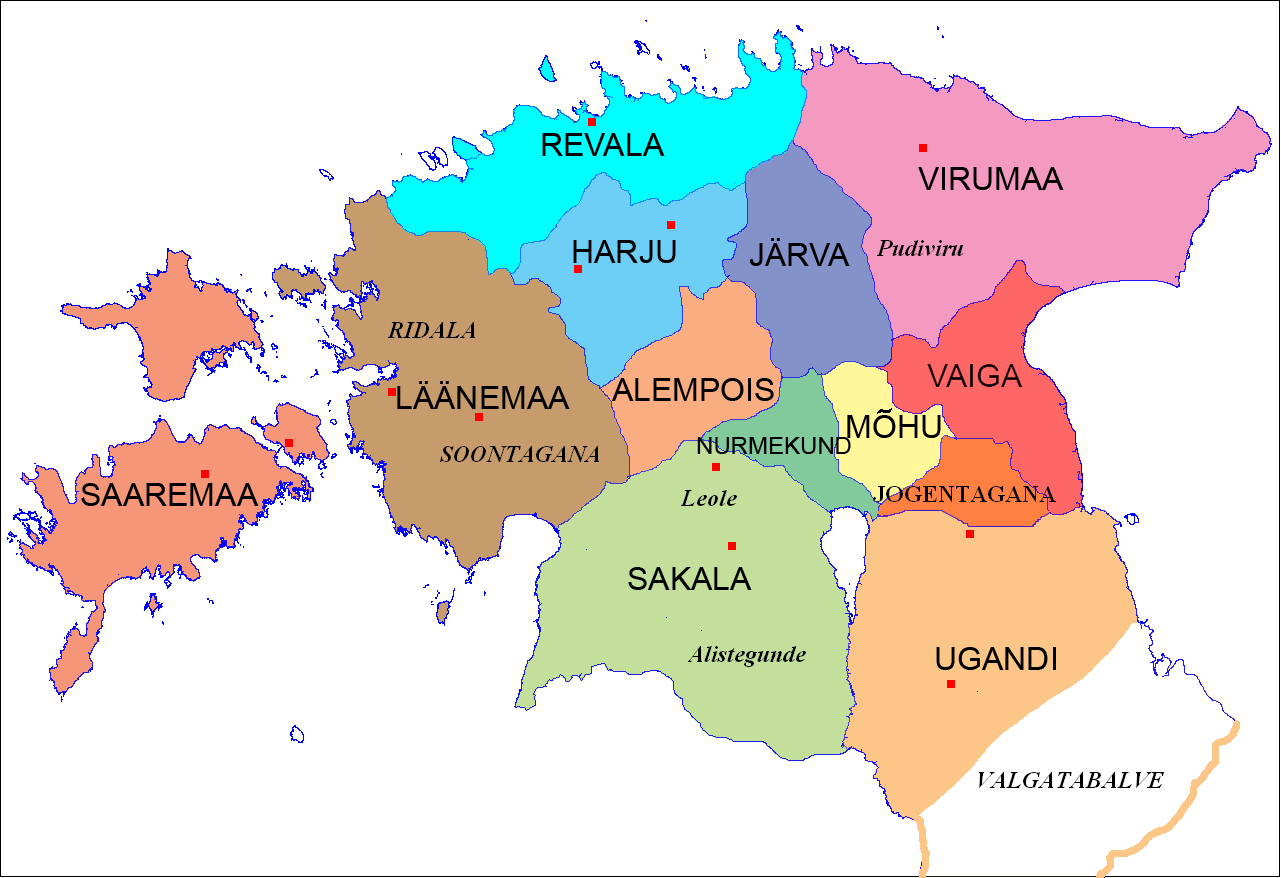
- Revala within the Ancient Estonia
- Capital: Lindanisa
- Area
  - Coordinates: 59°20′N 25°00′E
  - Type: Council of Elders
- History
  - Established: 9th century
  - Disestablished: 1224
Succeeded by
Danish Estonia

Revala (also Rävälä, Latin: Revalia, by Henry of Livonia Revele, by Danish Census Book Revælæ) was an Ancient Estonian county. It was located in northern Estonia, by the Gulf of Finland and corresponded roughly to the present territory of Harju County. It was conquered by the Danish in 1219 during the Livonian Crusade. It also contained the town of Lindanise, nowadays known as Tallinn, the capital of Estonia.

The Icelandic Njal's saga—composed after 1270, but describing events between the years 960 and 1020—mentions an event that occurred somewhere in the area of what is now Tallinn and calls the place Rafala. The toponym, Rafala, was probably a derivation of Rävala, or Revala, or some other variant of the locally used Estonian-language name for the adjacent medieval Estonian county.

== Parishes ==
- Rebala
- Ocrielæ
- Vomentakæ (Võhmataga)

== See also ==
- Battle of Lyndanisse
- Danish Estonia
- History of Estonia
- Harria
- List of Estonian rulers
- Livonian Crusade
- St. George's Night Uprising
