= Varbola Stronghold =

Circular rampart fortress in Estonia

Varbola
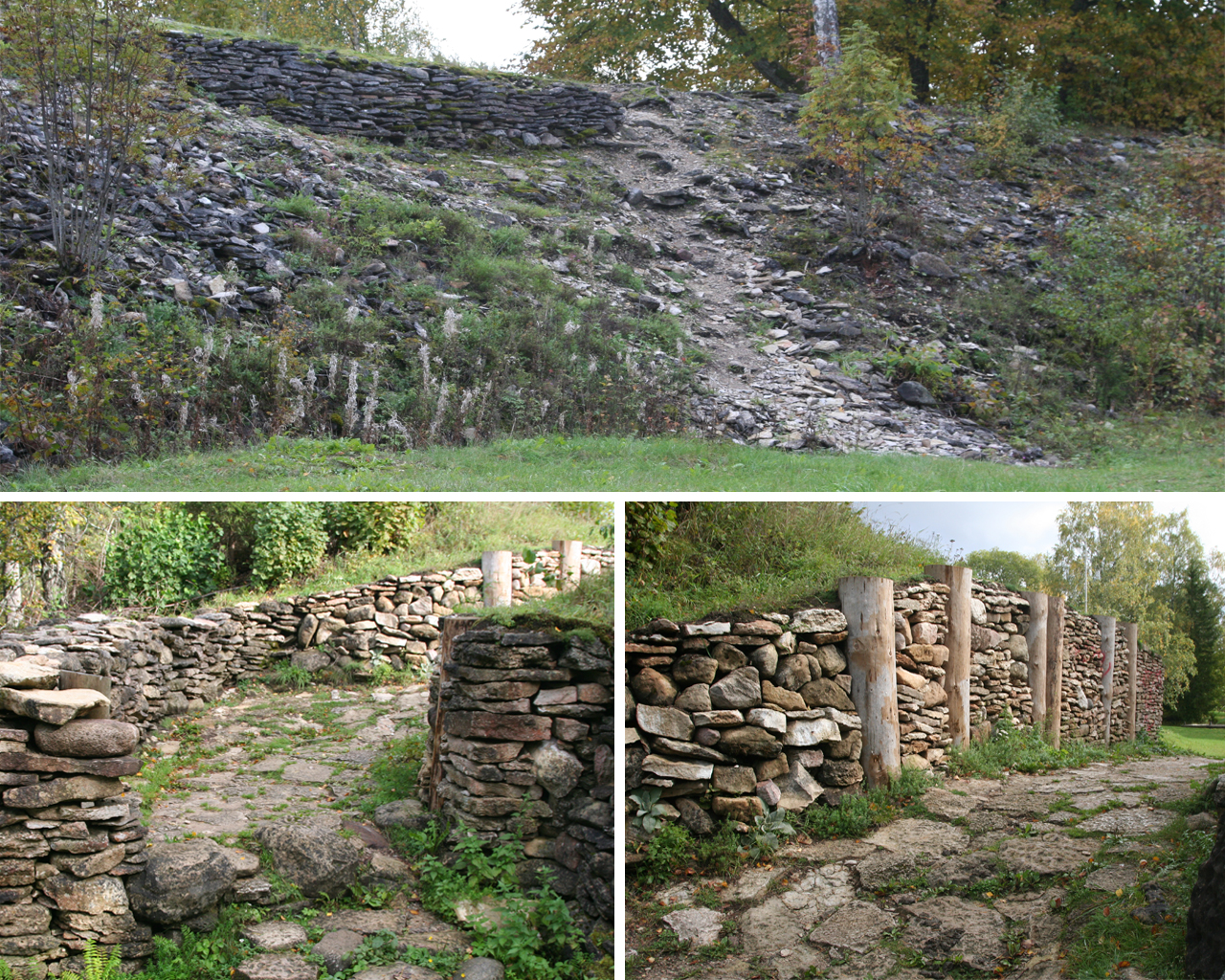
- Varbola ruins

- Location of the site in Estonia
- 59°02′23.9″N 24°30′37.67″E
- Location: Rapla County, Estonia

Site notes
- Condition: In ruins

The Varbola Stronghold (Latin: Castrum Warbole, Estonian: Varbola Jaanilinn) was the largest circular rampart fortress and trading centre built in Estonia, in Harju County (Latin: Harria) in the 10th – 12th centuries. Parts of the ruins of the 580-metre (1,900 ft) long and 8-to-10-metre (26 to 33 ft) high limestone wall of the fortress stand to this day. The long gateways with multiple gates were built to defend the entrances. In these sections higher defensive towers were erected. There was a 13-metre (43 ft) deep well in the middle of the fortress and the territory held about 90 structures with furnaces for accommodation built with limestone floors and foundations.

== History ==
=== First mention ===
Henry of Livonia mentions the Castrum Warbole being besieged in 1211 for several days by Mstislav the Bold of Novgorod. The conflict was resolved with a payment of seven hundred Marks.

=== Danish rule ===
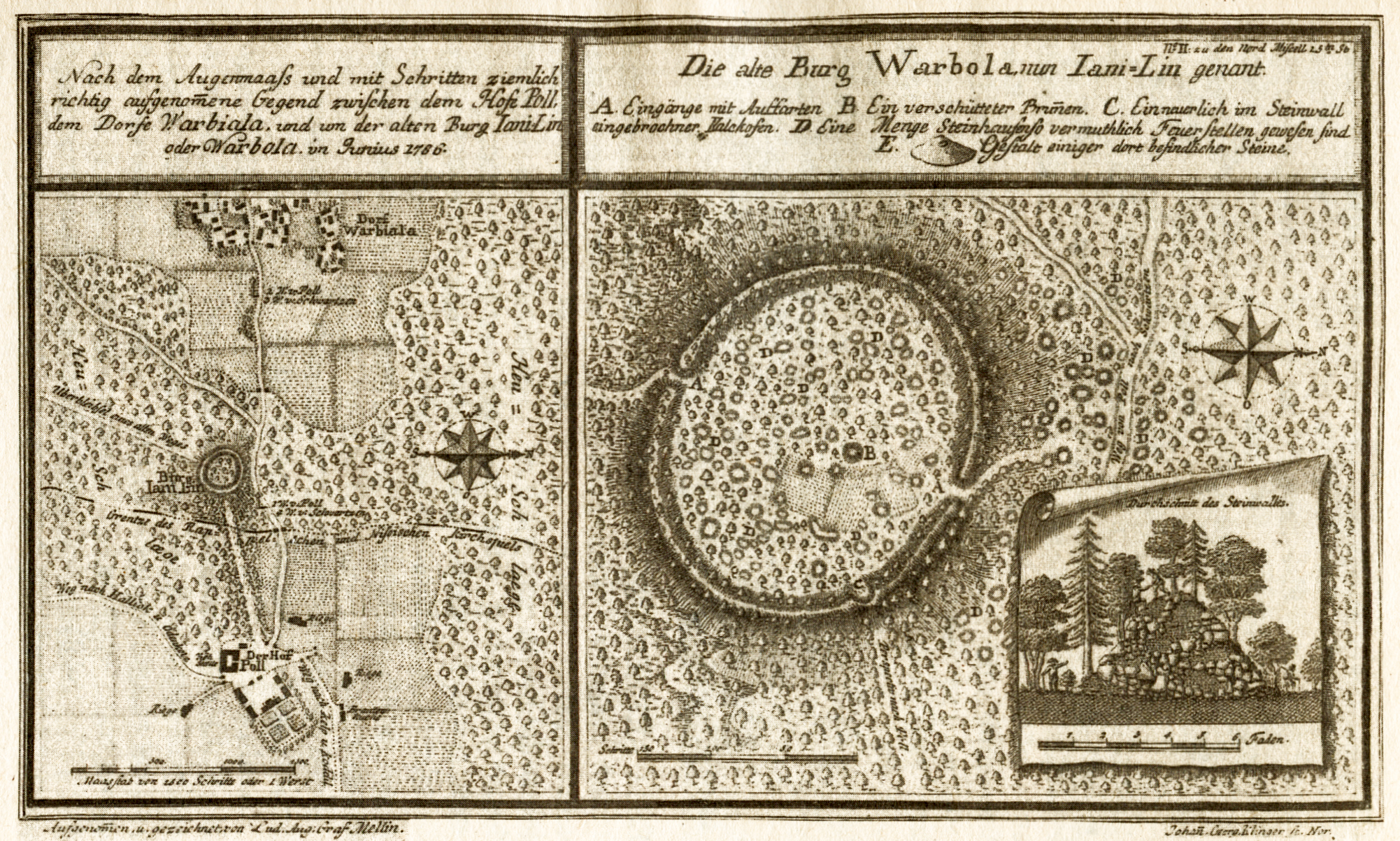
Map of Varbola by L. A. Mellin

During the Livonian crusade Livonian Brothers of the Sword invaded the territory and the people from Varbola asked for the terms of peace. The terms offered by Volquin, the Master of the Livonian Brothers of the Sword were: accepting Christianity and giving hostages. The proposal was accepted by Varbolians. The hostages were freed at the request of the envoys of the Danish king Valdemar II who had taken control over Northern Estonia. They asked that the hostages be turned over to them, as part of Estonia already belonged to the king of Denmark since it was promised by the bishops of Livonia. Master Volquin, unaware of the promise, honored the king of Denmark and the request under condition that the rights of the Livonian Brothers of the Sword shall not be diminished thereby and returned the hostages to their fathers. Thereafter the people of Varbola became the subjects of the King of Denmark. On the basis of the Danish Census Book (Latin: Liber Census Daniae) the estate surrounding the Varbola trading center remained a possession of the Lode family, nobility of Estonian origin at the time. The Danish king and his son Knut owned parts of the Lohu stronghold area, and the entire Keava stronghold area in Harju County.

=== Decline in 14th century ===
The Varbola stronghold lost its importance only in the second quarter of the 14th century, after having played in important part in the anti-Christian and anti-German St. George's Night Uprising of 1343.

=== Later history ===
In the 16th and 17th centuries, the stronghold was used as a cemetery. The first known fort plan dates from 1786 and was drawn by Ludwig August von Mellin. Archaeological excavations at the site have been undertaken in 1938–41, 1953 and 1974. Among the archaeological finds were dice made of bone.

== See also ==
- Valjala Stronghold
- Ancient Estonia
