= Saint George's Night Uprising =

1343–45 rebellion in Danish-controlled Estonia

- Medieval Livonia
Date	1343–1345
Location	Duchy of Estonia, Bishopric of Ösel-Wiek
Result	Uprising suppressed: Denmark sells the Duchy of Estonia to the State of the Teutonic Order

Belligerents
Revala, Harria, Rotalia, Vironia, Oeselia	Teutonic Order: Livonian Order; Medieval Denmark Bishopric of Ösel–Wiek

Commanders and leaders
Vesse of Oeselia † The Four Kings †	Burchard von Dreileben; Bertram von Parembeke (1343); Stigot Andersson (1344–1346)

Saint George's Night Uprising in 1343–1345 (Estonian: Jüriöö ülestõus, Estonian pronunciation: [jyri.øː yles.tɤus]) was an unsuccessful attempt by the indigenous Estonian population in the Duchy of Estonia, the Bishopric of Ösel-Wiek, and the insular territories of the State of the Teutonic Order to rid themselves of German and Danish rulers and landlords who had conquered the country in the 13th century during the Livonian Crusade; and to eradicate the non-indigenous Christian religion. After initial success the revolt was ended by the invasion of the Teutonic Order. In 1346, the Duchy of Estonia was sold for 19,000 Köln marks by the King of Denmark to the Teutonic Order. The shift of sovereignty from Denmark to the State of the Teutonic Order took place on November 1, 1346.

== Background ==
With the conquest of Ösel (Saaremaa) by the Livonian Order in 1261, Estonia was completely colonized by the Northern Crusaders from Germany and Denmark. The foreign rulers imposed taxes and duties even as the indigenous population retained individual rights, such as the right to bear arms. Oppression hardened as the foreign ruling class started to build manor-houses all over the country. The weight of duties to the lay masters was further multiplied by the repression of indigenous religious practices and economic exploitation imposed by the Catholic Church. The area was also politically unstable. The Estonian provinces of Harria (Harju) and Vironia (Viru) had been conquered by Denmark, but by the 14th century the kingdom's power had weakened. The province eventually was split between a pro-Danish party led by Bishop Olaf of Roskilde, and the pro-German party led by Captain Marquard Breide. 80% of the Danish vassals in the Duchy of Estonia were Germans from Westphalia, 18% were Danes, and 2% Estonians.

== Beginning of the uprising ==
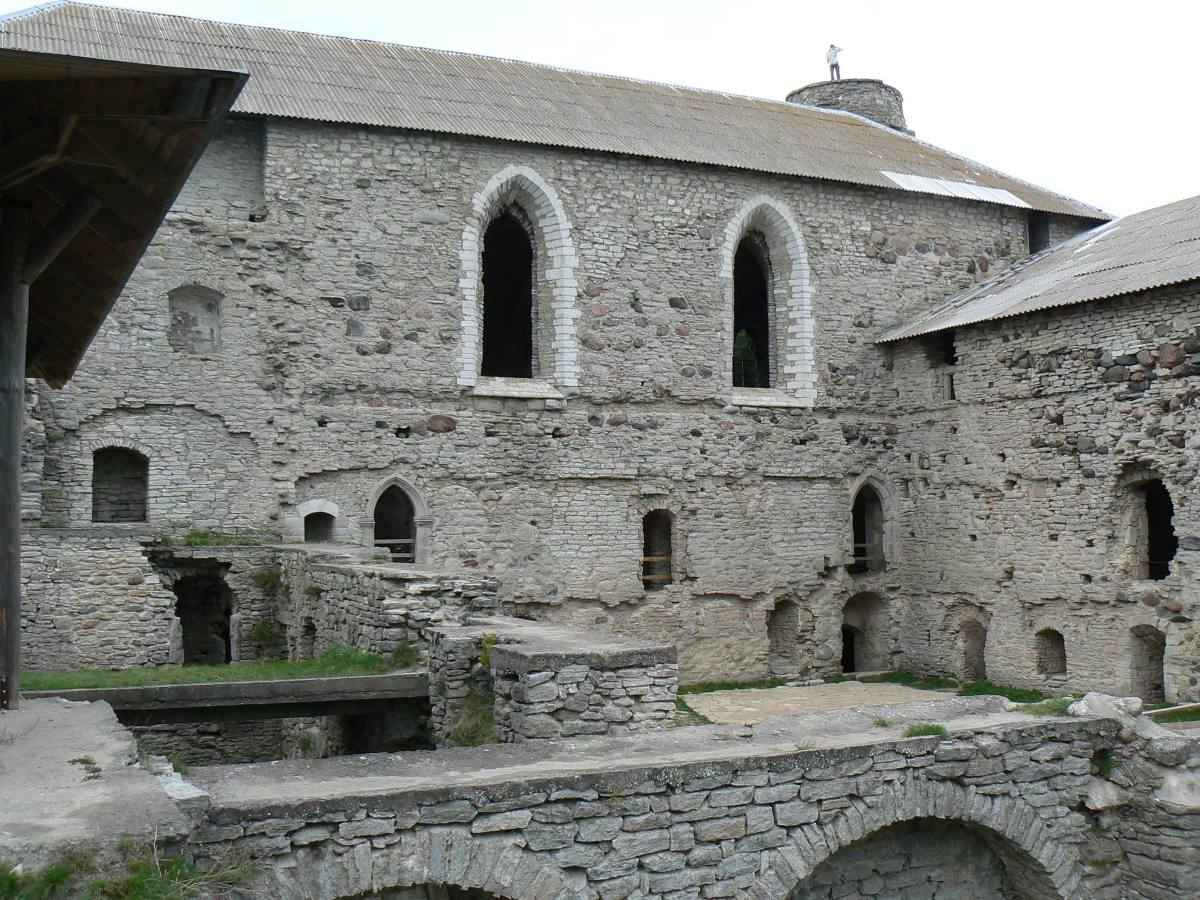
Padise Abbey.

On Saint George's Night (April 23) 1343, a signal was given by setting fire to a house on a hilltop for a coordinated attack on the foreigners in Harria. The plan was to "kill all the Germans along with their wives and children. And so it happened, because they started to slay virgins, women, servants, maidservants, noblemen and commoners, young and old; all, who were of German blood, had to die." According to the Younger Livonian Rhymed Chronicle, after renouncing Christianity, the rebel forces crisscrossed the whole province of Harria, burned down all the manors of the nobility and killed all the Germans who fell in their hands. Among others, they burned down the Cistercian Padise Abbey and massacred the 28 monks who had failed to escape. The chronicle adds that any German women or children who were spared by the men were killed by the women who then proceeded to burn down all the churches and the huts of the monks.

After the initial success, Estonians elected four kings amongst themselves. The kings along with the rebel army proceeded to Danish-held Reval (Tallinn) and laid siege on the city with 10,000 men. In the first battle under Tallinn the Estonians were victorious over the knights. However, the leaders of the rebellion were worried that once the Germans and Danes recovered from the initial shock, the Estonian government might not be able to withstand the combined onslaught of their enemies. Therefore, they sent a delegation to the Swedish bailiffs of Åbo (Turku) and Viborg and let them know that the Germans in Harria had been killed. They also told them that the Estonian army had laid siege on Reval, but they were willing to hand the Danish city over to the king of Sweden if the Swedes sent help. The bailiffs promised to raise an army and sail to Estonia.

After the initial success, the Teutonic Order was invited by the Danes, through the Bishop of Reval, Olaf of Roskilde, to quell the rebellion and take possession of the Danish castles in the region.

== Spread of the rebellion ==
A few days later, the Estonians in the province of Rotalia (Lääne) renounced Christianity and killed all the Germans they could find. After the countryside was firmly in the Estonian hands, the rebel army laid siege on the city of Hapsal (Haapsalu), the capital of the Bishopric of Ösel-Wiek. According to the Renner version of the Younger Livonian Rhymed Chronicle, 1800 Germans were killed in Läänemaa. According to the Wartberge and Russow versions, the number of 1800 or 2000 killed Germans refers to either Harria or Harria and Vironia combined.

== Massacre of the four kings ==
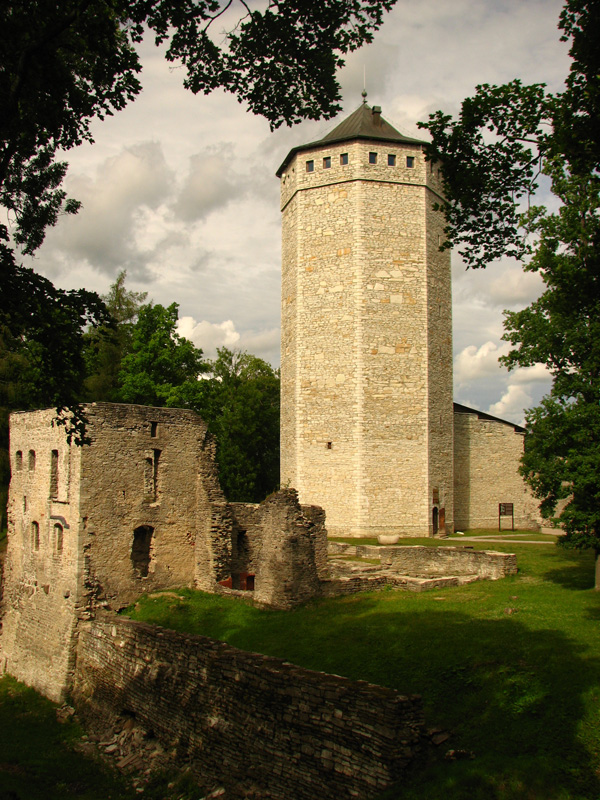
Ruins of Paide Castle

Soon after the massacre terrified survivors started to trickle to the castle of Weissenstein (Paide). The vogt of the castle immediately sent a letter to the master of the Livonian Order advising him on the situation. Burchard von Dreileben, the Livonian Master, sent one Brother to the Estonians "who knew their language and whom they knew" (possibly an ethnic Estonian member of the order) and asked them to send a delegation to Weissenstein to explain the reasons why they had renounced Christianity and killed all the Germans. He also promised to redress the past wrongs and establish good relations with the Estonians.

Estonians sent their four kings to Weissenstein accompanied by three squires. Estonians also let the bishop of Reval pass through rebel-held territory to attend the negotiations. Among the many high-ranking members of the Livonian Order who came to Paide were the Livonian Master Burchard von Dreileben, the komturs of Fellin (Viljandi) and Riga, the vogt of Jervia (Järva), and many others. The large number of knights who arrived to the negotiations indicates that the true purpose of the meeting was to neutralize the Estonian kings and then to attack the leaderless rebel army. Even after truce had been declared, knights of the Order attacked a camp of 500 Estonians in Ravila.

On May 4, the two sides sat down for talks. The Livonian Master personally served as the spokesperson for the German side at the conference. The Estonian kings offered to become vassals to the Livonian Order, provided they would have no overlords over them. The master demanded to know why they had killed so many people, including the 28 monks of Padise. The answer he received was that any German deserved to be killed even if he were only two feet tall. The master of the order, Burchard von Dreileben, pronounced the answer outrageous, but declared that the four kings and their retinue were to remain unpunished and could keep their personal liberty; however, until the master has returned from the campaign against the Estonian army the kings were not to be allowed to leave the castle of Weissenstein. The four kings, who had been granted safe passage under the medieval code of honor, were outraged. They demanded to be released so that they could meet their fate with their army, but to no avail.

When the Estonian delegation was escorted to their quarters they were suddenly attacked by their German hosts in the courtyard of the castle. In the ensuing fight the four kings and their squires were all hacked to death. The chronicle blames the incident on the envoys themselves, saying that one of them attempted to kill the vogt of Jervia (Järva) who had been assigned to attend to the Estonian envoys' needs. Some historians dismiss this explanation and say the negotiations were just a ruse to kill the leaders of the insurgency, and that the official version of the incident was a rather inept attempt to justify the murder of diplomatic envoys by the Teutonic knights.

== End of the rebellion in continental Estonia ==
=== Battle of Kanavere ===
A large army led by the Master of the Order proceeded immediately towards Reval, seeking out and engaging smaller Estonian units on the way. A larger Estonian force that had been sent to block the knights' advance was intercepted by the German cavalry. In the ensuing Battle of Kanavere on 11 May 1343, Estonians made a tactical retreat into the Kanavere bog. Since the knights were not able to employ their heavy cavalry in the bog, they dismounted and continued to fight on foot. The bog was not very large and the numerically superior forces of the Order were able to completely surround it. The battle ended with a German victory. Estonian losses in the battle amounted to 1,600 men.

=== Battle of Sõjamäe ===
After the battle of Kanavere, Burchard von Dreileben, the Master of the Order, wanted to avoid engaging the main force of the Estonian army, strategically camped next to a large bog, in yet another battle where the heavy cavalry of the Order would lose its tactical superiority. Therefore, he decided to use deceit and sent the vogts of Wenden (Cesis) and Treyden (Turaida) under the pretext of peace negotiations to the Estonians, apparently agreeing to the idea of vassalage without landlords. Estonians accepted the offer and the envoys returned to the German army. Von Dreileben, in the meantime, had two banners of cavalry locate between the swamp and the Estonian camp. After the envoys had delivered the acceptance of terms to the Order, the Master and the knights agreed that the killed Germans need to be avenged and the Estonians deserved no mercy. On 14 May 1343, the Germans attacked and Estonians began their retreat towards the bog. Because of the advance troops of the German cavalry, they were not able to complete this maneuver and in the battle that followed 3,000 Estonians were killed. According to the chronicle, individual Estonians who had pretended to be dead in their desperation tried to kill Germans even after the end of the battle. The location of the battle became known as Sõjamäe (lit. Warhill); it is now a subdistrict of Lasnamäe, Tallinn.

=== Aftermath of the Battle of Sõjamäe ===
The Master of the Order and the magistrates of Tallinn learned from a captured German deserter that the Estonians had been promised military assistance from Sweden that had recently conquered several Danish territories in Scandinavia. Swedish forces were expected to arrive in Estonia in five days. The subjects of the Danish king in Tallinn, severely weakened after the carnage in Harju and Viru, and fearful of the Swedish intentions, submitted Tallinn and other Danish dominions in Estonia under the protection of the Order. After being promised compensation the Master of the Order agreed to provide Reval and Wesenberg (Rakvere) with German garrisons.

The bailiff of Viborg arrived with a large army on 18 May and the bailiff of Åbo a day later. After discovering the Danish stronghold in the hands of the Order and the Estonian army utterly defeated, the Swedes satisfied themselves with looting around Reval before sailing back to Finland.

The Estonians had also tried to find allies in Russia. Two envoys had been sent from Harria to Pskov to inform the Russians of the slaughter of the Germans in Harria and Vironia and the imminent demise of the Order. The envoys suggested that the Russians may want to loot the German dominions in southern Estonia. On 26 May 1343, the Bishopric of Dorpat (Tartu) suffered a belated intrusion by 5,000 Pskovians. However, since the rebellion in Estonia had already been largely crushed the Order was able to scramble enough troops and with some effort rout the marauding Russians, killing about 1,000 of them.

In the meantime, the Master had led the main force of the Order to Rotalia in order to break the siege of Hapsal. The Estonians retreated from the city without battle, again taking refuge in the bogs.

Soon the Livonian Order received more troops from the Teutonic Order in Prussia. In the beginning of the winter the Master of the Livonian Order returned with these reinforcements to Harria and quelled the remaining resistance. The last Estonian strongholds in Harria to fall were Varbola and Loone (Lohu). In the wake of the bloody suppression of the rebellion, Harria was described as a "barren and desolate land".

The chronicler Bartholomäus Hoeneke also tells a story about Estonians plotting to get inside the castle of Fellin by hiding armed warriors in bags of grain. The plot failed when one mother tipped off the Order commander in exchange for the life of her son. This possibly apocryphal account has inspired several writers.

After losing Reval and Wesenberg to the Livonian Order in 1343, the severely weakened Denmark also lost Narva in 1345. Thereupon king Valdemar IV in 1346 sold the Duchy of Estonia to the Teutonic knights for 19,000 silver marks (4 tons of silver). Another 6,000 marks was paid to the Margrave of Brandenburg. Another consequence of Saint George's Night Uprising was the disappearance of the remnants of pre-Christian Estonian nobility in North-Estonia.

== Rebellion in Ösel ==
On 24 July 1344, one day before St. Jacob's Day, Oeselians in Ösel (the islands of Saaremaa and Muhumaa) renounced Christianity, killed all the Germans, and drowned the priests in the sea. On the same day they assembled around the Castle of the Livonian Order in Pöide. The castle surrendered after an eight-day siege. The vogt of the castle along with his garrison of Livonian Knights, as well as all the other Germans in the castle, were promised free passage. Regardless, all the defenders of the castle were killed after they had come through the gates.

Saaremaa and Muhumaa remained in Estonian hands until the winter. As soon as the sea between the islands and the continent was frozen, the Master of the Order with fresh reinforcements from Prussia crossed the sea and invaded Saaremaa. The German army looted and burned all the villages they came across and finally laid siege on Purtsa Fortress, one of the largest Estonian strongholds on the island. In the winter of 1344, one day before Shrove Tuesday, the knights penetrated the stronghold after tearing down one of the battlements. According to Wigand of Marburg, 2,000 people were killed in the fortress. Germans lost 500 killed. The Oeselian king Vesse was captured, tortured, and then executed. Nevertheless, Saaremaa remained free and staunchly anti-Christian as the German army was forced to cross back to the continent before the sea ice melted in the spring and the roads became impenetrable for the returning reinforcements from Prussia.

In the winter of 1345 the Christian army returned to Saaremaa where it laid waste to the northern districts by looting and burning for eight days. Eventually Oeselians asked for peace. The two sides reached an agreement and the army of the Livonian Order left Saaremaa after the Oeselians had reluctantly agreed to giving hostages and tearing down the fortress of Maasilinna Castle. The rebellion in Ösel had lasted for two years. With the conditional surrender of Ösel Saint George's Night Uprising was finally over.

== In literature ==
The Saint George's Night Uprising has inspired several historical novels by Estonian writers, such as Eduard Bornhöhe's Tasuja (The Avenger). The Soviet Union tried to use the anniversary of the uprising in 1943 to pit Estonians against Germans.

The uprising is also a popular subject for debate among Estonian historians and writers. Some, like Edgar V. Saks and the writer Uku Masing have argued on the basis of contemporary documents that, contrary to claims in the chronicles, the uprising was not a fight against Christianity but only against the Livonian Order and that the crimes attributed to the insurgents were actually committed by the Order. Some see it as a continuation of the struggle between the Order and the Holy See. Others dismiss such claims as biased and unhistorical.
