= Harjumaa (ancient county) =

Ancient county of Estonia

Harria Harjumaa
- County of Estonia
- 1st century AD–1224
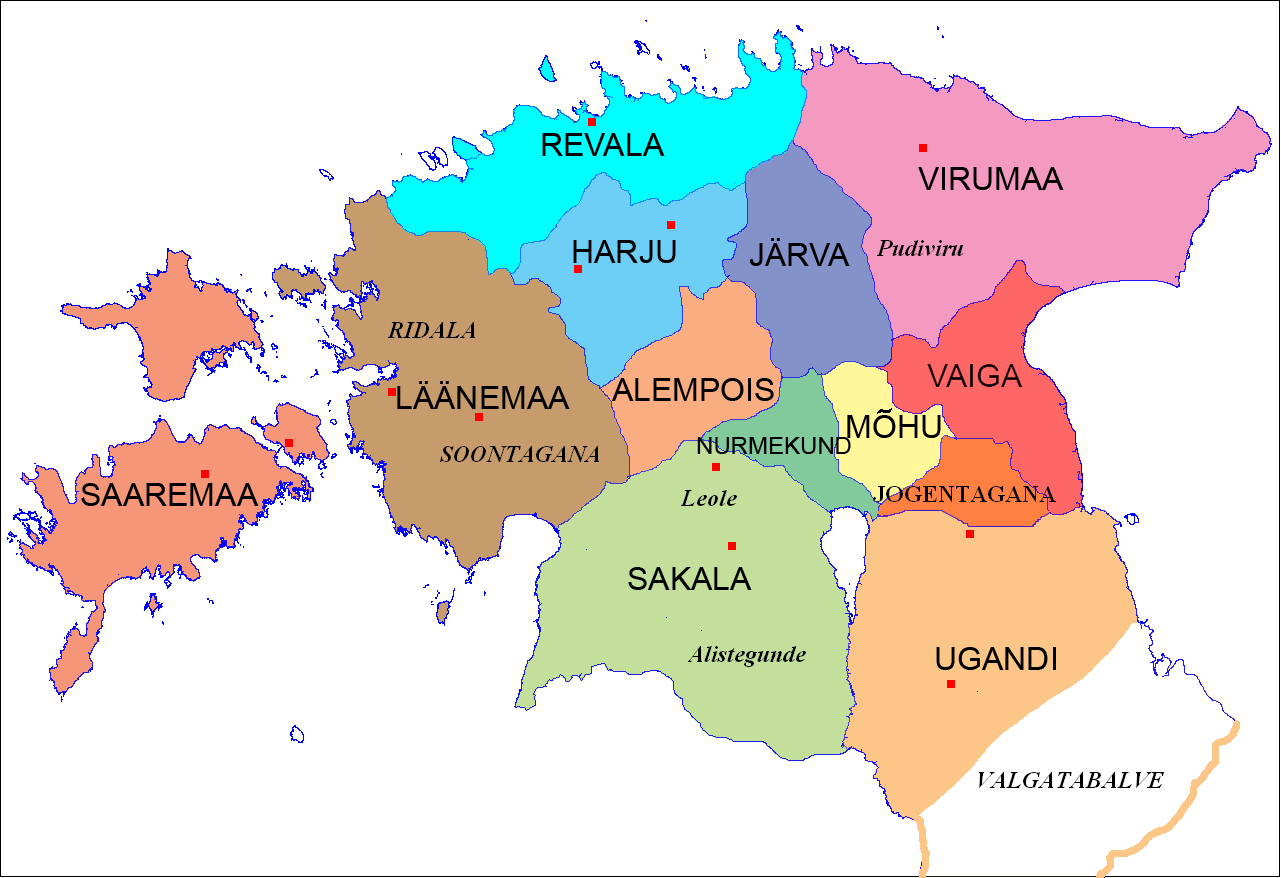
- Ancient Estonia until 1214
- Capital: Varbola
  - Type: Council of Elders
- History
  - Established: 1st century AD
  - Disestablished: 1224
Succeeded by
Danish Estonia

Harjumaa (Latin: Harria; German: Harrien) (1200 hides), was a historical county in Ancient Estonia until the early 13th century. Its territory roughly corresponds to modern-day Rapla County with the town of Rapla as the capital. According to the Livonian Chronicle of Henry, Raikila was the main village of Harjumaa, where annual gatherings of the surrounding tribes took place.

Despite the name, the present-day Harju County covers only a small portion of the historical Harjumaa land, with most of its current territory corresponding to the ancient county of Revala.

== History ==
Between the 10th and 12th centuries, one of the largest trading centers in Harjumaa was the Varbola Stronghold (Latin: Castrum Warbole). The first crusade to Harjumaa occurred in the summer of 1216, initiated by the crusaders of Riga. It involved Livonians, Latgalians, and the Livonian Brothers of the Sword, led by Master Volkwin. To secure a truce, Volkwin demanded that the inhabitants of Varbola accept Christianity and release their prisoners.

== Parishes ==
- around Varbola
- around Lohu
- around Kose

== See also ==
- Danish Estonia
- Harju County
- Rapla County
- History of Estonia
- Livonian Crusade
- Rulers of Estonia
- St. George's Night Uprising
- Varbola Stronghold
