= Ancient Estonia =

Estonia from the mid-8th millennium BC to early 13th century AD

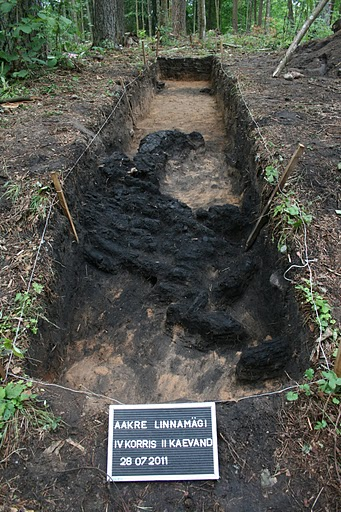
An archaeological excavation at the Aakre hillfort

Ancient Estonia is the prehistoric period in the history of Estonia that concerns the emergence of human settlement in the area of what is now modern-day Estonia. It follows the period in the history of Estonia from the middle of the 8th millennium BC (around 8000 BC) until the conquest and subjugation of the local Finnic tribes in the first quarter of the until the 13th century during the Teutonic and Danish Northern Crusades during the Middle Ages. The prehistory of Estonia is divided into the Middle Stone Age (9600–3900 BC), New Stone Age (3900–1800 BC), Bronze Age (1800–500 BC), and Iron Age (500 BC – 13th century), and these in turn into sub-periods.

== Overview ==
=== Methods ===
In the study of Estonian prehistory since the late 1950s, scientific dating methods have been increasingly used to determine the dates of different artifacts. Over time, scholars have revised the sub-periods and dating of Estonian prehistory as radiocarbon years have been recalibrated and period definitions updated. For example, while the start of the Neolithic once marked the introduction of pottery, it is now defined by the shift from a foraging to a productive economy. Some evidence of human activity was destroyed in the Paleolithic era by the movement of the continental ice sheet.

The main source material for the prehistory of Estonia consists of archaeological sites. Written sources (such as the Norse sagas collection "Heimskringla", Saxo Grammaticus's Gesta Danorum, Adam of Bremen's chronicle, Old Russian chronicles, especially the "Tale of Bygone Years", Henry's Chronicle of Livonia, Liber Census Daniae) are few and date from the end of the prehistoric period. The study of plant remains, especially pollen, provides insight into the history of plants, while also reflecting human impact and land use methods. Paleozoology provides information about animals, including game and domestic animals. Also helpful are paleogeographical, geological, and pedological studies, which make it possible to determine changes in relief and water regime, the development of soils, etc. Additional information has been provided by linguistics, physical anthropology, population genetics, ancient DNA research, ethnography, numismatics, and folklore. With archaeological research methods, using the stratigraphic method, it is only possible to determine the relative age of monuments and historical events to one another. As a result of human activity, soil layers accumulate on top of each other over time, forming a cultural layer, where ancient artifacts located in the lower layers are generally older than the finds in the upper layers. So, to determine the absolute age of monuments, information obtained through written sources was initially used. Since artifacts from literate regions also spread to surrounding groups, including in the area of Estonia, it was possible to estimate their age as well.

=== Dating ===
Presently, the radiocarbon dating method is primarily used to determine age. However, in Estonia, it is still common to also date artifacts using objects whose age can also be determined by other means (such as written sources, dendrochronology, or coral). The currently used periodization of Estonian prehistory is as follows:

Main Period	Sub-Period	Specific Era	Date Range
Stone Age	—	Late Stone Age or Paleolithic	Until 9600 BC
Stone Age	—	Middle Stone Age or Mesolithic	9600 – 3900 BC
Stone Age	—	Stone Age or Neolithic	3900 – 1800 BC
Bronze Age	—	Early Bronze Age	1800 – 1100 BC
Bronze Age	—	Late Bronze Age	1100 – 500 BC
Iron Age	Late Iron Age	Pre-Roman Iron Age	500 BC – 50 AD
Iron Age	Late Iron Age	Roman Iron Age	50 – 450 AD
Iron Age	Middle Iron Age	Migration Period	450 – 600 AD
Iron Age	Middle Iron Age	Pre-Viking Age	600 – 800 AD
Iron Age	Early Iron Age	Viking Age	800 – 1050 AD
Iron Age	Early Iron Age	Late Iron Age	1050 – 1200/1250 AD

The following table presents examples of periodizations by Estonian scholars from the years 1982 (which was before radiocarbon year calibration), 2001, and 2003/2017.

Time period	Jaanits et al 1982	Lang & Kriiska 2001	Kriiska & Tvauri 2002	Lang 2003/ Kriiska 2017
Middle Stone Age	7500 – 3000 BC	9000 – 4900 BC	9600 – 5000 BC	9600 – 3900 BC
New Stone Age	3000 – 1500 BC	4900 – 1800 BC	5000 – 1800 BC	3900 – 1800 BC
Early Bronze Age	1500 – 1000 BC	1800 – 1100 BC	1800 – 1100 BC	1800 – 1100 BC
Late Bronze Age	1000 – 600 BC	1100 – 500 BC	1100 – 500 BC	1100 – 500 BC
Early / Pre-Roman Iron Age	600 – 0/100 AD	500 BC – 50 AD	500 BC – 50 AD	500 BC – 50 AD
Late / Roman Iron Age	0/100 – 5th c. II half AD	50 – 450 AD	50 – 450 AD	50 – 450 AD
Middle Iron Age	5th c. II half – 900 AD	450 – 800 AD	450 – 800 AD	450 – 800 AD
Early Iron Age (Viking Age and Late Iron Age)	900 – 13th c. beginning AD	800 – 1200/1250 AD	800 – 1210/1250 AD	800 – 1200/1250 AD

== Holocene and Mesolithic period ==
During the Holocene, there were periods of both ice melt, which raised sea levels, and periods of glacial retreat. The drainage of glacial lakes significantly impacted the region's overall climate. Over 100 settlement sites from the end of the Ice Age have been discovered in the Baltics: most in southern Lithuania, and the northernmost in central Latvia along the Daugava River. Since the Estonian territory was also likely mostly ice-free and habitable at that time, it is plausible that people reached there as well, although no signs of human activity that early have been discovered yet.

As the glacier retreated toward the Scandinavian Mountains, the southeastern regions were the first to emerge from under the ice, and northwestern Estonia, Hiiumaa, and western Saaremaa were the last. In total, this process took about 2,000 years in what is now Estonia. The continental ice sheet and its meltwaters reshaped the landscape by both eroding and accumulating material. Meltwaters gathered in lower areas, especially in the basins of Peipus and Võrtsjärv, and flooded all of northwestern and western Estonia, the islands, and a large part of northeastern Estonia. In front of the ice margin, the Baltic Ice Lake formed, encompassing the southern part of the present Baltic Sea along with the Gulf of Finland and Lake Ladoga.

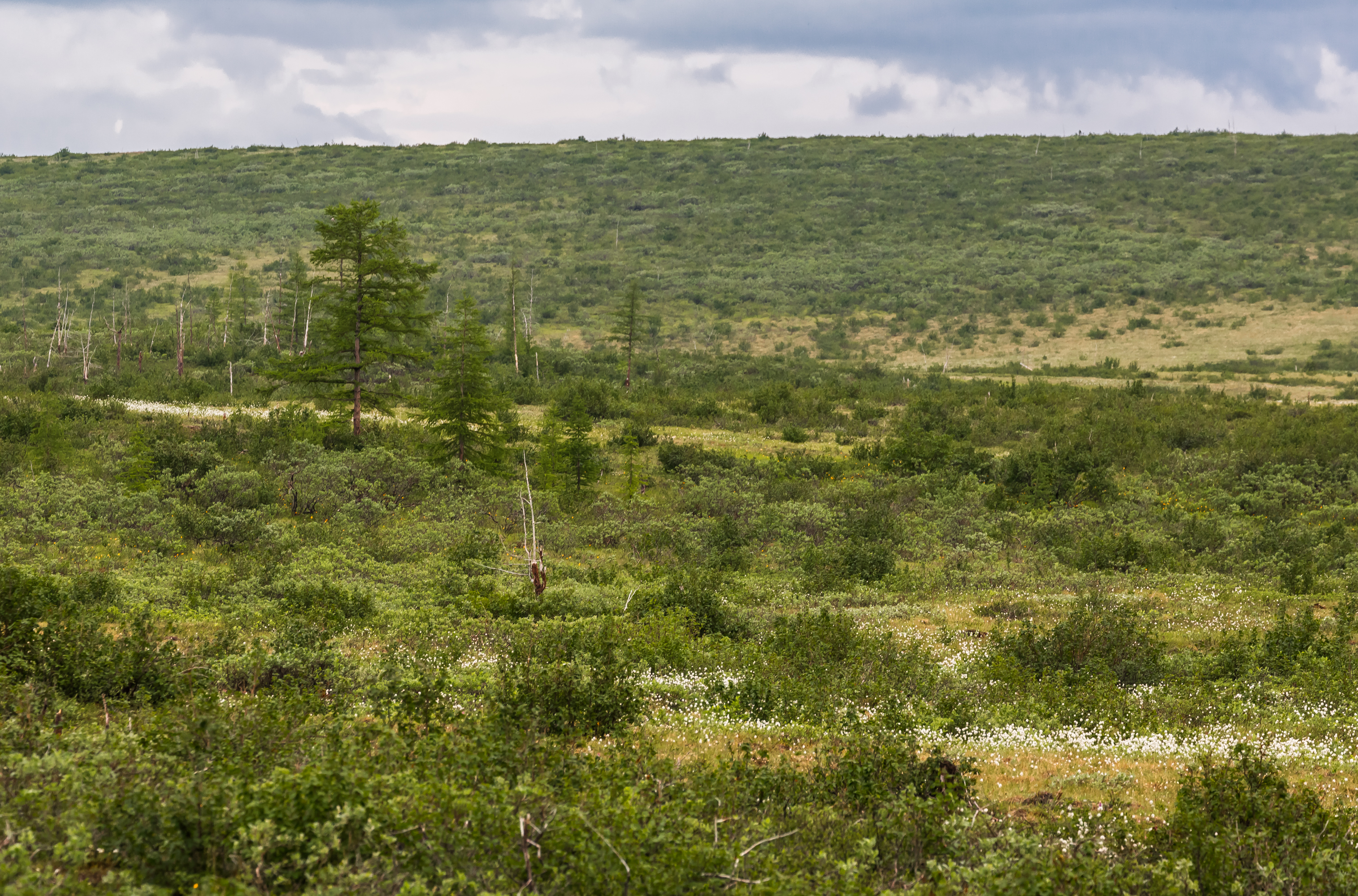
The forest tundra landscape was characteristic of the post-glacial period

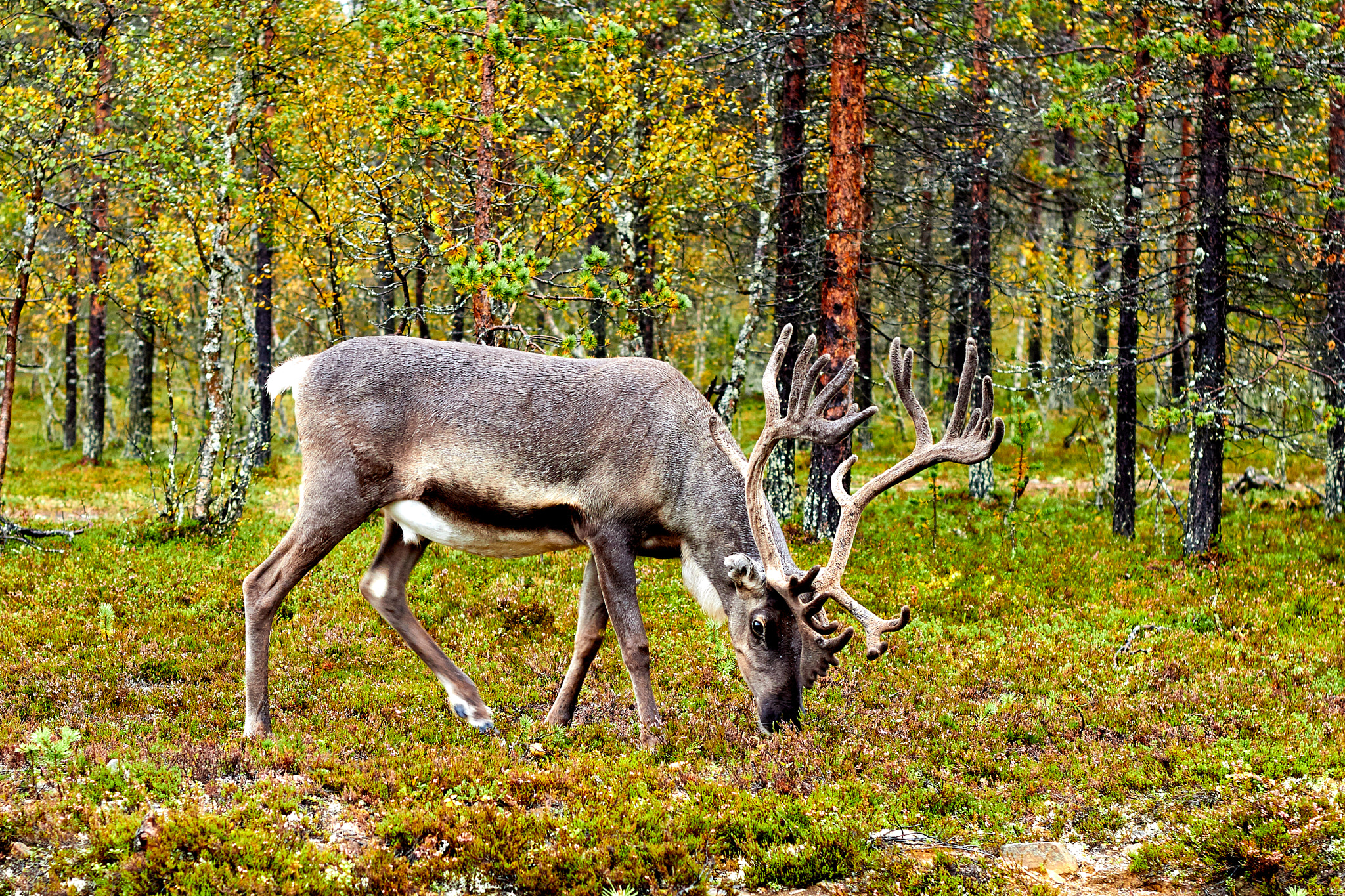
Reindeer are thought to be one of the first animals to reach Estonia

The climate was arctic and subarctic; in the open landscape, tundra-like vegetation spread, herds of reindeer and wild horses moved about, and mammoths, woolly rhinoceros, and aurochs were also found. During the Allerød climate period (12,000 – 10,700 BC), a temporary warming and drying of the climate occurred (average temperature about 6° lower than today), which led to the arrival of temperate zone plants (birch and pine forests, dwarf birch, herbaceous plants such as goosefoot, mountain avens, botrychium, valerian, etc.) and animals (probably wolf, lynx, beaver, brown bear, red fox, moose, otter, mountain hare), but during the Younger Dryas chronozone (10,700–9600 BC), the climate cooled sharply and tundra and steppe-like landscape with cold-loving grasses, moss, dwarf birch, willow, and juniper became dominant again. Pine or birch grew in the small remaining forests. Wild animals retreated to the south, and reindeer and mammoths moved into the Estonian region once more.

While no direct evidence has been found of the Older Stone Age or Paleolithic human settlement in the Estonian territory, it is possible that the first hominins arrived even before the last, Weichselian glaciation, or even during its milder climate period around 30,000 BC, when conditions were suitable for the life of mammoths, for example. At that time, Homo sapiens inhabited most of the habitable regions of Europe. In the Estonian region, however, the continental ice sheet destroyed all potential signs of this. Evidence of human presence in the Baltics dates from around 11,000 BC. Settlement in the eastern Baltic region arose as a result of two migration waves: first, people of the Bromme culture (from 11,000 BC) originating from the Hamburg culture in northern Central Europe, upon which the Ahrensburg culture was based, and 1,000 years later, a settlement wave of the Świdry culture originating from the area of modern day Poland. These two archaeological cultures coexisted for some time, influencing each other. Eventually, the Świdry culture integrated with the Ahrensburg culture.

=== Comb ceramic culture ===
==== Ancestry ====
Little is known about the genes of the earliest inhabitants of the Estonian territory, as no human remains that old have been found in Estonia or its immediate surroundings. The oldest bones whose DNA has been studied originate from people of the Narva culture who lived in the 5th millennium BC. Their mitochondrial DNA, i.e., DNA sequence inherited in the maternal line, belongs to haplogroup U and is typical of the Mesolithic European population. Other components of genetic material show similarity to people living in the Baltics at the same time and slightly earlier. In a broader sense, they are close to Western European hunter-gatherer-fishers, although characteristics typical of people living further east at the time are also present. Soon (from 3700–3600 BC), however, cultural unity decreased, and regional specificities developed. This was reflected in pottery making, which began to be distinct. This was particularly true between the islands and the mainland. This period is called the Late Comb Ware culture.

DNA analysis of the remains of four Estonian Comb Ceramic culture individuals showed that all 3 women belonged to the maternal lineage haplogroup U. This result fits with other studies on early Neolithic Europe. One tested man belonged to the paternal lineage haplogroup R1a5. Similar paternal lineages have also been found among Eastern Hunter-Gatherers. While genome-wide analyses of Mesolithic inhabitants of the eastern Baltic coast showed greatest affinity with Western Hunter-Gatherers, individuals of Estonia's Neolithic Comb Ceramic culture were most similar to people belonging to the same culture in Latvia and eastern hunter-gatherers, which indicates that the arrival of Comb Ceramic brought additional genetic material to Estonia from the east.

Signs of more intensive and diverse activity in settlements, and the coexistence of animal bones with different peak hunting seasons, point to the emergence of villages in use year-round. Villages usually had 2–4 dwellings and presumably a couple of dozen to fifty people. Both above-ground and semi-subterranean rectangular houses with floors sunken into the ground were used as dwellings, with walls woven between wooden structures or partially made of horizontal logs. Based on dwelling remains excavated in Latvia and Lithuania, it can be assumed that houses often had gable roofs. Dwellings were generally built next to each other, parallel to the shore, with the doorway facing the body of water. The main living activity took place between the buildings and the waterline. Lighter shelters were presumably established during and for hunting trips.

It has been suggested that the earliest inhabitants of the Estonian territory were relatively tall, based on early Mesolithic skeletons from eastern Europe. Men at that time averaged 174 cm. Women averaged 160 cm in height. Later, stature appears to have decreased. Judging by Estonia's oldest human remains from the 6th–5th millennium BC, the average height of men at that time was 164 cm and of women 157 cm. Mesolithic people were long- or medium-headed, with a wide and high facial area and a projecting nose.

==== Society ====
Social organisation was apparently relatively egalitarian, although certain differences based on gender, age, personal abilities, etc., existed. Customs and division of labor presumably applied; men usually went hunting, while women engaged in gathering and household chores. Cohabitation was apparently regulated, and intra-community marriages may have been forbidden. If partners came from other communities, this was simultaneously a factor that connected wider areas, carrying and preserving cultural traditions, and spreading new ideas and skills. Labour was divided into the clan according to gender and age. The tasks of men were hunting, fishing, and community defence. The main work of women was gathering plant food, preparing food and clothing, and raising children. Women's roles were more significant because men were often away from home for long periods. Kinship was calculated only in the maternal line, which is why this stage of clan order is called matrilineal or matriarchy.

==== Religion ====
Not much is known about the religion of the earliest inhabitants of the Estonian territory, as evidence related to beliefs has not been found. However, there is some information from the late Mesolithic period. Placing an animal tooth pendant with a deceased person during burial points to some religious belief and ritual. It is possible that death was not viewed as the end of life, but as a change in its form. Animal and human figures made of antler, dating from the late Mesolithic, were evidently also related to religion. Burial sites located near water and figures found at the bottoms of bodies of water may indicate that holy sites were associated with bodies of water. In recent archaeological literature, the entire Mesolithic period in the region is no longer considered just the Kunda period; it makes up a small period among a number of other settlements. In Estonia, researchers refer to specific periods during this time: the Pulli (9600–8500 BC), te Kunda (8500–7000 BC), the Sindi-Lodja (7000–5200 BC), and the Narva stages (5200–3900 BC).

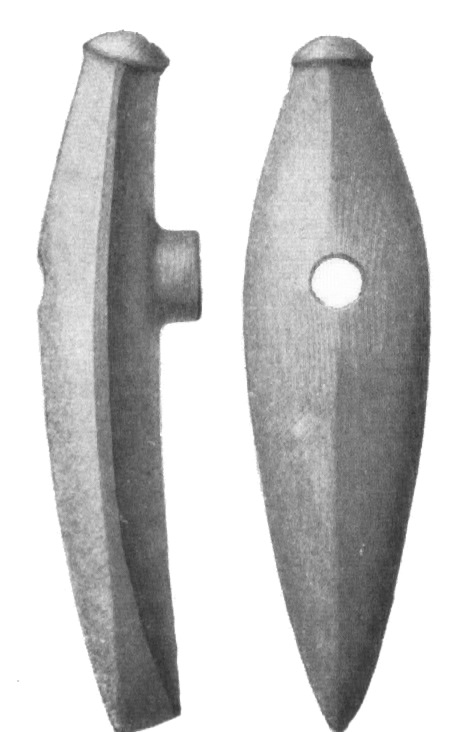
Battle-axes probably also had a religious function

Art and culture, too, were evidently very closely linked in the Stone Age, and art had a religious meaning in addition to aesthetics. Among the artifacts of the Comb Ceramic culture are many pendants made of bone, amber, and stone, including tooth pendants, beads, animal and human-shaped forms, or forms with simple geometric designs. Most pendants have one or more attachment holes and were worn around the neck or attached to clothing, including headwear. Pendants without attachment holes could be worn in a pouch. Sculptures have been found less frequently. During the Comb Ware period, ceramic figurines began to be made, depicting heavily stylised humans, animals, or water birds. Pendants and sculptures have been associated with totemism, soul concepts, or magical practices. Birds and snakes, like later indigenous peoples, may have been spirit animals for Comb Ceramic people as well. The religious connection between death and birds is pointed to by a burial part of a crane's wing, which was placed in both of a child's hands. A bear burial in Valma, where the animal was interred under a hearth (as humans sometimes were), was evidently related to totemism.

Comb Ceramic people often buried near living sites and even inside dwellings, but individual burial sites, mainly in western Estonia, were also located away from them. The dead were placed in shallow earth graves lying on their backs, outstretched, with hands on their chests or sides. In some cases, men and women were placed in double graves facing opposite directions. Sometimes the head end was left higher, or a log was placed there. In one child's grave in Valma, a hearth was placed above the head. In the well-preserved graves of the Tamula settlement site, branches and birch bark were placed on the bottom. Sometimes ochre was sprinkled into the grave. The dead were buried in clothing adorned with bone, tooth, and amber pendants, and tools were often included, pointing to meat through the presence of unworked animal bones. It has been suggested that burying people in or near their living sites in the Comb Ceramic culture may have aimed to seek the favor and protection of such influential individuals. On the other hand, the occurrence of intra-settlement burials has been doubted: a cultural layer resembling a settlement could also form at a cemetery where rituals were regularly performed, or only a part of the corpse, e.g., a bone, was brought to the settlement for some ritual or magical reason.

==== Settlements ====
As the ice retreated at the end of the Holocene, the post-glacial environment likely dictated the pace of settlement, setting the conditions for early settlements to emerge. Over 200 Middle Stone Age settlement sites and 4 burial sites have been found in the Estonian territory. In the first half of the Mesolithic, people preferred the banks of rivers and lakes as living sites, which were favourable locations for hunting and fishing. Bodies of water also allowed for faster travel than wooded land. In the second half of the Mesolithic, settlement also reached the sea coast and islands. Around 5800 BC, the first seal hunters reached Saaremaa, where permanent settlement likely arose during the Mesolithic, in 5700 BC Hiiumaa, and in 5300 BC Ruhnu island, where seasonal hunting trips were made. It is possible that non-fishing implements (arrowheads, daggers) discovered alongside the viper figure from Tõrvala were cast into the water as a votive offering to ensure success in fishing and water bird hunting. It has been suggested that, similarly to many other archaic religions, the inhabitants of the Estonian territory believed in the animacy of nature.

==== Language ====
The language of the Mesolithic inhabitants of the Estonian territory is still unknown. Since the common vocabulary of Finnic languages spoken later in this region contains words for which no equivalents or convincing loan etymology could be found in more distant related languages, Paul Ariste suggested that some of these may be substratum words originating precisely from the time of the Kunda culture, before the arrival of Finno-Ugric and Indo-European peoples, in an unknown so-called Paleo-European language spoken and later extinct in the Estonian region.

==== Subsistence ====
For the Comb Ceramic population in the first half of the New Stone Age, the main way of obtaining food remained hunting, fishing, and gathering, which reached its highest development at that time. Game fauna diversified. Inland, people hunted mainly moose, aurochs, beaver, and wild boar, as well as wild horse, red deer, roe deer, hare, bear, fox, wolf, marten, and other animals. Agriculture reached Estonia in 4000–3000 BC. The oldest oat pollen has been found in northern Estonia, dating from around 4000 BC. Slightly later are the first signs of barley from Hiiumaa on the Kõpu Peninsula and wheat from northern and Western Estonia around 3500 BC. Around the same time, agriculture also began in southern Scandinavia. Farming at that time, however, remained an exceptional activity that did not affect settlement and material culture. Long-term settlements are unknown, and people presumably moved around a lot. More evidence of farming is from the Corded Ware culture era, around the 3rd millennium BC. Animal bones and charred barley grains are found in burial and settlement sites. Coastal people hunted seals, and in the second half of the Neolithic, also porpoises. Inland fish caught included primarily pike, perch, bream, and catfish, while on the coast and islands, cod, pike-perch, flounder, and other marine fish were also caught. Fishing mainly used nets and frequently hooks. Gathering (collecting berries, mushrooms, nuts, and bird eggs) presumably held an important place, although archaeological traces of it are hard to find. A large number of river and marine mussels discovered at the Riigiküla settlement site evidently point to the consumption of these mollusks.

=== Languages ===
According to the Comb Ceramic theory, the spread of the Comb Ware culture marked the migration of Finno-Ugric speakers, or more specifically, early Finns, to the shores of the Baltic Sea, where the population speaking an unknown language that previously lived there was assimilated. The starting point of the theory was the understanding that from the period of the Comb Ceramic culture onwards, development without significant breaks is evident in the archaeological material of this region until the populations speaking Finno-Ugric languages known from historical times.

Petri Kallio has put forward a new idea that with the Comb Ceramic culture, a Pre-Uralic language spread from the Volga-Oka region to the Baltic Sea. In his assessment, this fits with the fact that identifying a substratum in Uralic languages spoken later in the former comb ceramic area is difficult, and language forms originating from Pre-Uralic would be similar to Uralic languages and hard to distinguish. In Uralic languages spoken outside the comb ceramic area (such as Sami), however, a non-Uralic substratum is clearly identifiable. but it has been considered likely that these traditions, primarily late corded ware, nevertheless continued in the Early Bronze Age as well. Pollen deposits found in bogs and lakes indicate the impact of human activity, but these impact phases have mostly remained short-lived.

== Late Stone Age or Paleolithic period (until 9600 BC) ==
=== Corded Ware culture (2800–2000 BC) ===
Distribution area of Corded Ware and Yamnaya cultures

As a result of the extensive migration of stock-breeding Yamnaya culture pastoralists originating from the Pontic-Caspian steppe in Eastern Europe, new archaeological cultures and societies emerged in Central, Northern, and Eastern Europe at the beginning of the 3rd millennium BC. After clay vessels with characteristic ornamentation (corded ware), they are called Corded Ware cultures, and after boat- or boat-shaped stone axes, also battle-axe cultures. The tribes of the battle-axe culture brought the keeping of domestic animals and the beginnings of agriculture, along with stone-drilling as a technical innovation. One cultural region with unique characteristics formed in Estonia, northern Latvia, southeastern Finland, and adjacent Russian areas, but all Corded Ware cultures were united by the similarity of basic artifact types.

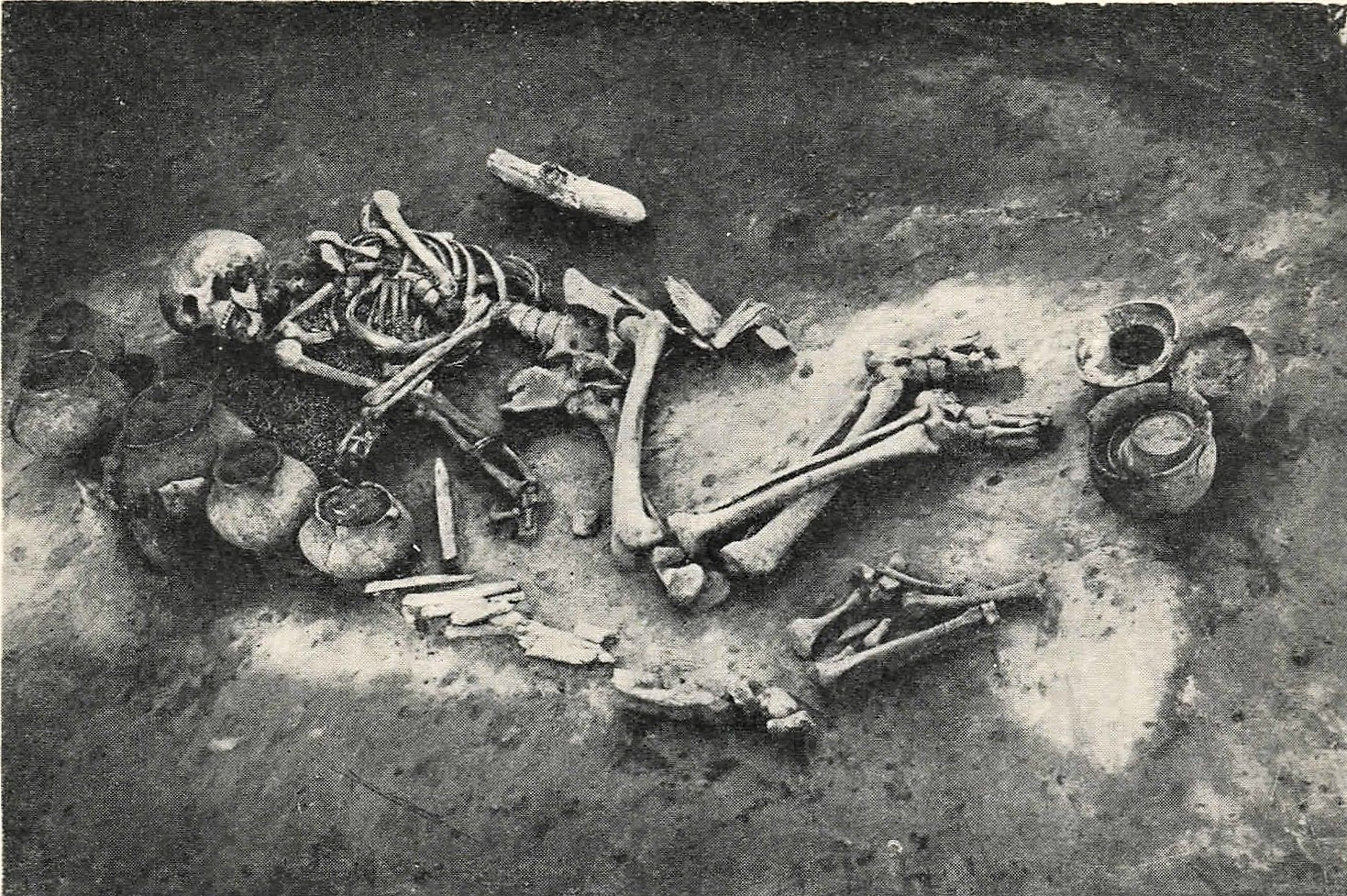
In the Corded Ware culture, people were often buried on their side with bent legs

==== Religion ====
Corded Ware burials were generally located away from dwellings, and often on higher hills. A burial site usually contained 1–2 graves, rarely more. The dead person was placed there in a crouched position and often on their side, women on the right side and men on the left, with one or both hands potentially under the head. Regarding the Sope underground burial site, there is a report of a sitting burial. In Tamula, one dead person was buried wrapped in birch bark, and in Karlova in Tartu, covered with limestone slabs. In one woman's grave in Sope, there were hearths and small stones placed under the shoulder. Grave goods usually included boat-shaped stone axes, other tools and clay vessels.

Eighty Comb Ceramic and two dozen Corded Ware culture burial sites are known from Estonia. The scarcity of burial sites evidently indicates that not all members of the community were interred in them, those buried may have been individuals with a certain special status. The remaining people were treated differently after death, perhaps similarly to the custom of many other indigenous peoples of casting them into a body of water, leaving them on the ground in the forest, or placing them in trees.

The prehistoric landscape of the European Plain and the subsequent Bronze Age migrations from Siberia marked both cultural and biological shifts in the region. Southern Estonia maintained strong ties to southern territories, evidenced by the abundance of iron artifacts. The coastal regions and western islands were more likely to encounter neighbouring groups while crossing the Baltic Sea.

==== Settlements ====
About 50 settlement sites of the Corded Ware culture are also known from Estonia (e.g., Ardu Neolithic cemetery), and their locations differ from those of the Comb Ceramic culture, presumably stemming from the needs of a productive economy. Corded Ware tribes brought the keeping of domestic animals and the beginnings of agriculture. Their living sites are no longer located by bodies of water, but usually on the Pandivere Upland, Sakala Upland, and generally higher places near which natural grasslands were found. A thin cultural layer and small cemeteries are all that remain of the Corded Ware culture tribes. From this, it is inferred that they lived in small communities that occasionally changed locations in search of new pastures and perhaps also land plots suitable for crop cultivation. Judging by finds, it can be stated that they raised mainly sheep, goats, pigs, and to a lesser extent cattle. Settlement sites are not directly on the sea coast and sometimes not even on the shores of major rivers and lakes.

On Hiiumaa, Saaremaa, and at Riigiküla, living sites were chosen 1–1.5 km away from the coast, where grasslands for animal husbandry and suitable soil for agriculture presumably existed. For the first time, the limestone plateaus of northern Estonia and the peripheral areas of inland uplands were settled. In northern Estonia, people lived on easily cultivable humus-rich thin rendzina plains. In eastern and southwestern Estonia, settlement was associated with riverbanks presumably due to floodplain meadows there, which were among the few places in an otherwise wooded and swampy landscape where fields could be tilled and livestock raised. In the society of the Corded Ware culture, the dominant form of settlement was presumably the single farmstead and this explains the relatively small territory of their settlement sites and the thin, artifact-poor cultural layer. Similar to the Comb Ceramic culture, their houses were also rectangular and had above-ground or semi-subterranean floors.

==== Ancestry ====
Genetic studies have confirmed that the Corded Ware culture spread along with human migration. Corded Ware people who settled in the Estonian territory alongside the population of the Comb Ceramic culture arrived presumably via the Central European plain. DNA analysis of the remains of some individuals of the Estonian Corded Ware culture showed that they belonged to maternal lineages U, haplogroup T, haplogroup J, and haplogroup H, and the paternal haplogroup R1a-Z645. This paternal lineage is also the most common in Central European Corded Ware cultures. Women's maternal lineages align with findings of other studies covering farmers of the European Corded Ware culture. Genome-wide analysis of Corded Ware culture people also revealed that they clearly differed from Comb Ceramic people, but were similar to populations living elsewhere in Europe in the late Neolithic and Bronze Age. Analysis of the autosomal and X chromosome origins of Corded Ware culture people showed that in addition to Yamnaya culture ancestry, the people who brought Corded Ware to the Estonian territory also carried a small amount of genetic material from Europe's first farmers originating from Anatolia, especially in the maternal line.

==== Languages ====
With the Corded Ware culture, Indo-Europeans or Balts were thought to arrive. North of the Daugava River, they likely remained in a numerical minority and gradually merged into the Finns. Since the 1990s, the idea of a Finno-Ugric-speaking Comb Ceramic culture population has lost support, because linguistically the branching of Finno-Ugric languages is placed in a considerably later period than the spread of comb ware, and equating an archaeological culture with a specific language and interpreting settlement continuity as linguistic continuity are considered unfounded premises. In addition, continuity in settlement development has begun to be seen from the post-glacial first inhabitants, or conversely, a break in settlement after the Comb Ceramic culture period.

=== Society ===
Due to different economic modes, the societies of the hunter-gatherer Comb Ceramic culture and the agricultural Corded Ware culture were presumably organised differently. The productive economy of the Corded Ware culture evidently led to the growth of the family role in both economic and social terms, whereas the central unit of the Comb Ceramic culture may have been the village community. Since such larger human groups presuppose a certain centralisation of management, it can be assumed based on analogues of modern indigenous peoples that Comb Ceramic communities had chieftains. The broader cultural contacts of the populations of both cultures differ somewhat. Corded Ware people had far fewer eastern influences and materials obtained from there.

== Early and Middle Neolithic ==
=== Pulli settlement ===
The Pulli settlement emerged around the Ancylus Lake area following initial melting of the Scandinavian Ice Sheet. The Pulli settlement (near present day Sindi) has determined to be made by those from the Kunda culture. The site is located on the banks of the modern-day Pärnu River.

The late Neolithic began a period in Estonia where findings directly related to religion are few or absent altogether. Pendants with figures, which were very common earlier, disappear, and the number of tooth pendants decreases significantly. This evidently indicates a change in religion.

Many artifacts from this era were primarily crafted from flint and quartz. Lammasmäe likely was used as a defensible island camp within a post-glacial lake (from c. 8700–4950 BC).

=== Kunda culture ===
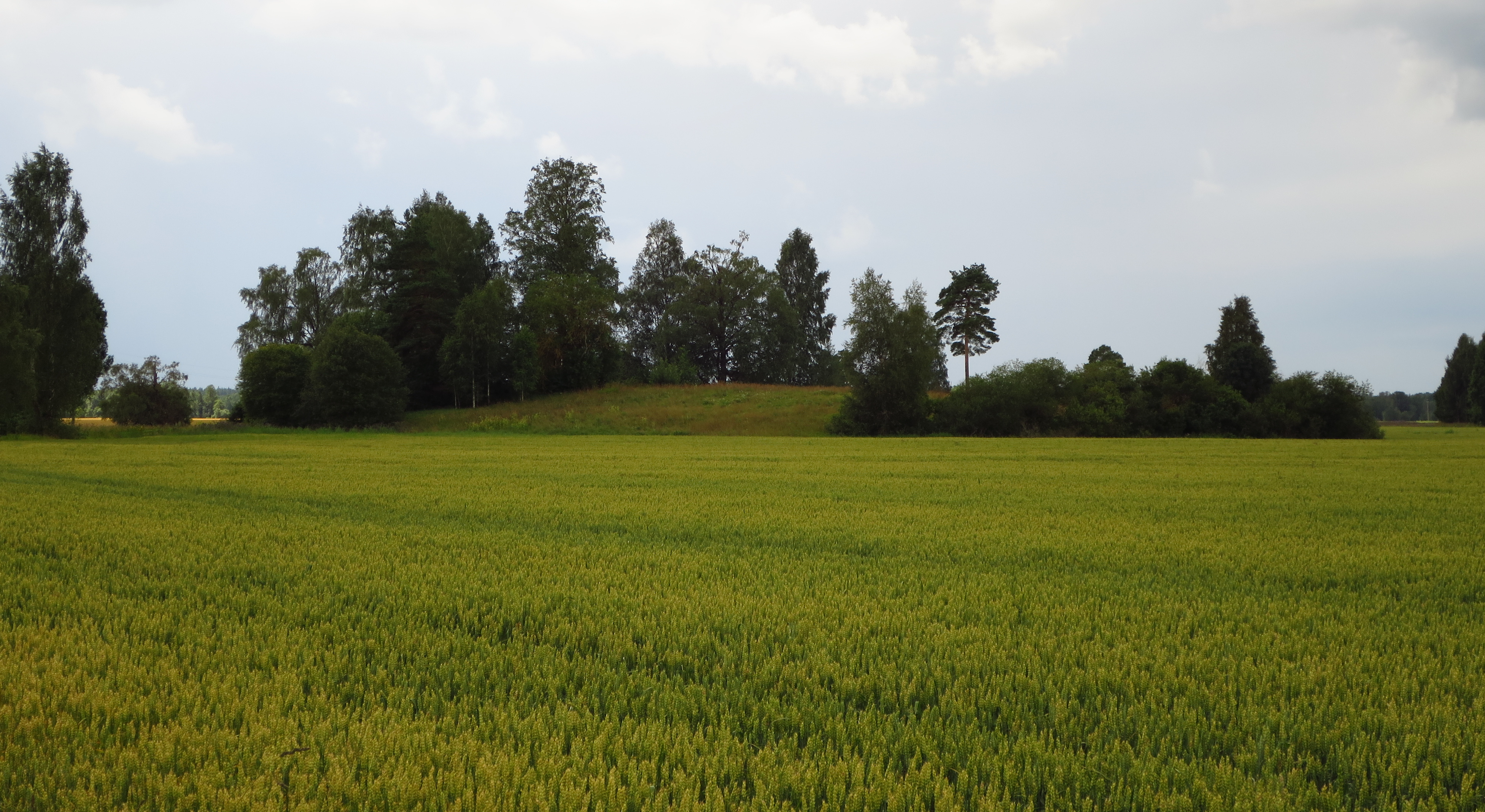
Kunda Lammasmägi today

As hunter-gatherer groups adapted to changing landscapes, subsistence strategies became increasingly diversified. While the Middle Neolithic saw greater complexity and innovations, the socio-economic adaptation of Late Palaeolithic and Mesolithic populations was closely tied to fluctuating climate conditions. The name of the culture was derived from the town of Kunda, Estonia, where the Lammasmäe settlement was excavated. Archaeological evidence from the Estonian coastal area and islands might suggest that the "sub-Neolithic" economy remained heavily reliant on marine resources and seasonal hunting well into the fourth millennium BC.

The transition from hunter-gatherer societies to sedentary farming in the Eastern Baltic was a prolonged and non-linear process with regional adaptations. Early research suggested a relatively late shift toward agriculture, but more recent analysis of the Narva culture indicates that pottery and semi-sedentary settlement patterns preceded full-scale cereal cultivation. In regions where high-quality flint was scarce, local quartz was used as a substitute for cutting tools, a practice found across other locations in Latvia and Finland.

=== Narva culture ===
The Neolithic period in the region is marked by the ceramics of the Narva culture. The pottery of the Narva culture was tempered with pebbles, shells, or plants. The oldest finds date from around 4900 BC. The first pottery was made of thick clay mixed with pebbles, shells or plants. Narva-type ceramics are found throughout most of the Estonian coastal region and on the islands. The stone and bone tools of the era are similar to the artifacts of the Kunda culture.

Until the early 1980s, the scholarly consensus held that the appearance of Comb Ceramic culture artifacts was likely associated with the arrival of Baltic Finns (ancestors of the Estonians, Finns, and Livonians) on the shores of the Baltic Sea. However, an alternative hypothesis is that migration may have been associated with a warming climate. Some researchers have argued that an Uralic language may have been spoken in Estonia and Finland since the end of the last glaciation. Evidence from Lithuania, Finland, and the Karelian Isthmus shows that pottery traditions lasted because they were well-suited to the local environment.

Burials during this period often included figures of animals, birds, snakes and humans carved from bone and amber, beginning from the middle of the 4th millennium BC. However, the wide variety of burial styles found across the region suggests that there were many different ways of thinking about death and there were many different local beliefs. the eventual transition of hunter-gatherers to farmers was also defined by broader linguistic diffusion. According to Primary Chronicle the Chudes where one of the founders of the Rus' state in 9th century. According to Nestor Yaroslav I the Wise invaded the country of the Chuds in 1030 and laid the foundations of Yuriev, (the historical Russian name of Tartu, Estonia). According to the Novgorod Chronicle, Varyag Ulf (Uleb) from Novgorod was crushed in battle in 1032 at Iron Gate, likely located in northern Russia, but this may have referred to the sea near Tallinn Bay.

At the end of the Stone Age, some stone axes, which were intentionally left or buried in cultivated fields or wetlands, evidently had a religious background. They were likely used in rituals associated with fertility and fertilisation, or with the sun, carried out collectively. Axes have sometimes been interpreted as cult objects associated with the sky and the god of thunder.

== Bronze Age ==
The Bronze Age began around approximately 1800 BC. The development of the borders between the Baltic Finns and the Balts continued as the first fortified settlements, Asva, Ridala on the island of Saaremaa, and Iru in Northern Estonia, were built. The development of shipbuilding facilitated the spread of bronze. As Estonia lacked large, accessible local deposits of copper and tin, the Bronze Age (1800–500 BC) was instead driven primarily by maritime trade. Fortified settlements like Asva on Saaremaa emerged as centres for metalworking and shipbuilding. The dead were often laid on their sides with their knees pressed against their breast, one hand under the head, and objects placed into the graves were often made of bones of domesticated animals. The available archaeological material indicates that the Estonian territory (like Latvia and southern Finland) had sparse and unstable settlement in the Early Bronze Age. In Valter Lang's assessment, the region was inhabited by small human groups differing from one another in culture and language, and it is unclear whether these languages originated from the Indo-Europeans of the Corded Ware culture or the language of the Comb Ceramic culture.

== Iron Age ==
The Roman Iron Age in Estonia (c. 50–450 CE) was shaped by the indirect influence of the Roman Empire, evidenced by discoveries of Roman coins, jewellery, and other imported artifacts. This era introduced the first definitive evidence of agriculture in the region, such as charred wheat grains discovered on the walls of a corded-ware vessel at the Iru settlement. Additionally, osteological analysis from this period suggests early attempts were made to domesticate wild boar.

== Early Middle Ages ==
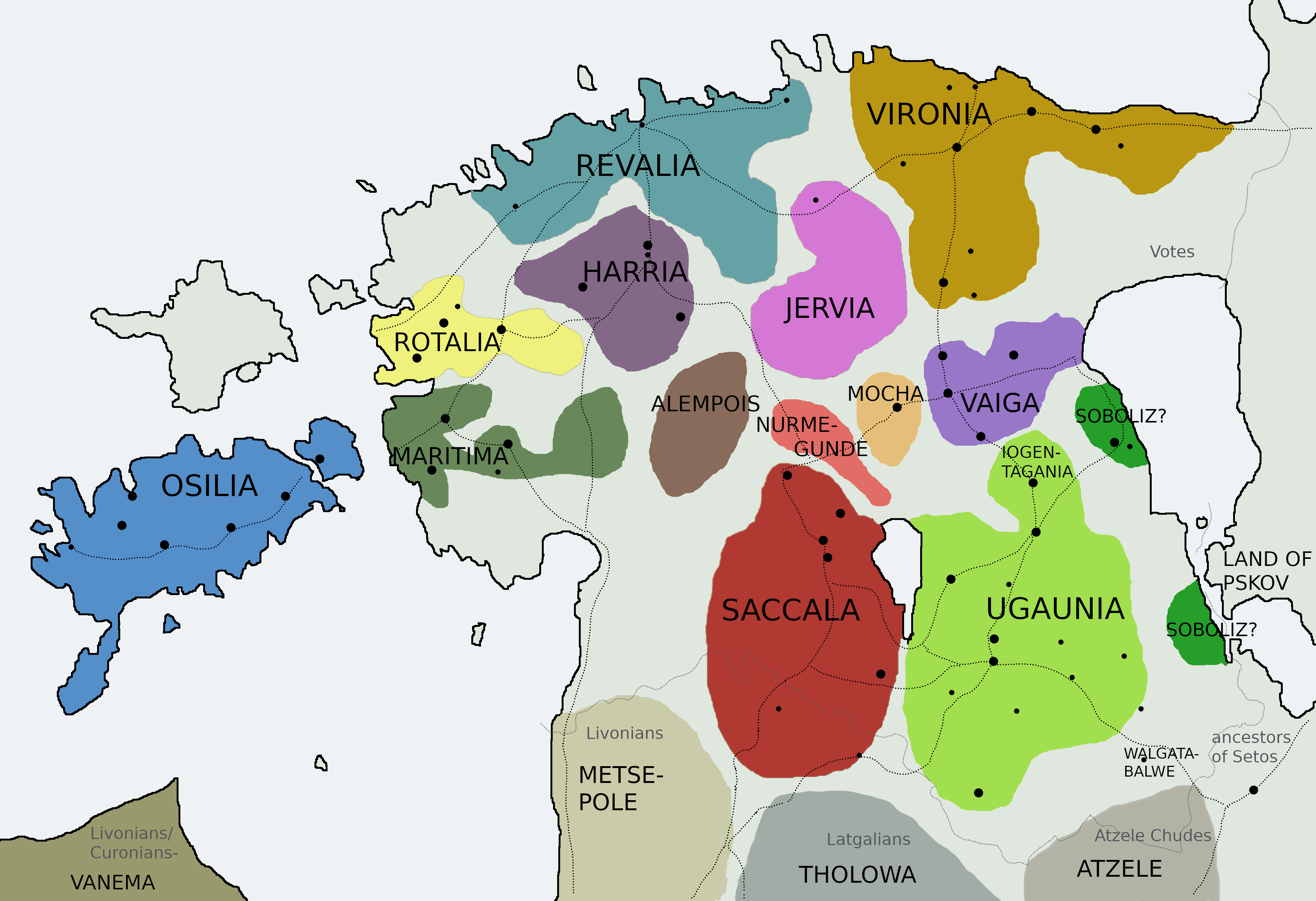
Estonian counties in the 12th century

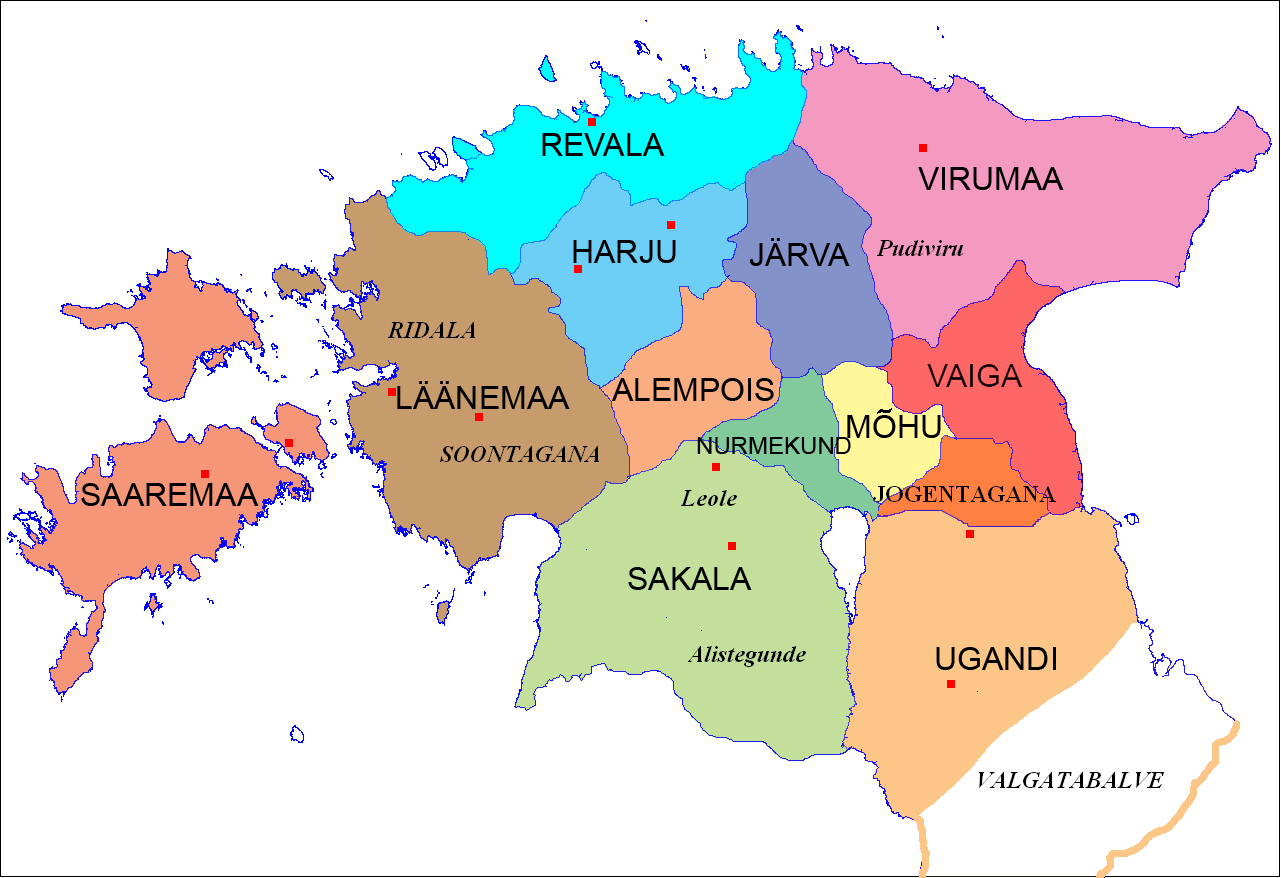
Counties of ancient Estonia in the beginning of the 13th century

The geographical extent of Estonian territory during the early medieval period remains difficult to attest. The ethnonym may be derived from the Aestii, a group mentioned by Tacitus in the 1st century AD. However, scholars suggest that at that stage, the term likely referred to Baltic tribes inhabiting the region of present-day Kaliningrad and western Lithuania. By contrast, 13th-century Norse sagas explicitly used the term to indicate Estonians. While some interpretations of Ptolemy's Geography also place the Oeselians on the Baltic shore during the 2nd century, Saxo's later accounts confirm the Estonians were active maritime participants alongside the Curonians, distinct from the Letts and Lithuanians. While the oldest Arabic dirham silver coins from the region date back to the 8th century, the majority of hoards originate from the 11th and 12th centuries. Notable Viking Age hoards have been discovered at Maidla and Kose. During the 11th century, Scandinavian chronicles frequently record conflicts with Vikings from the eastern Baltic shores. The subsequent rise of Christianity and the centralisation of authority in Scandinavia and Germany eventually culminated in the Teutonic and Northern Crusades on the shores of the Baltic Sea.

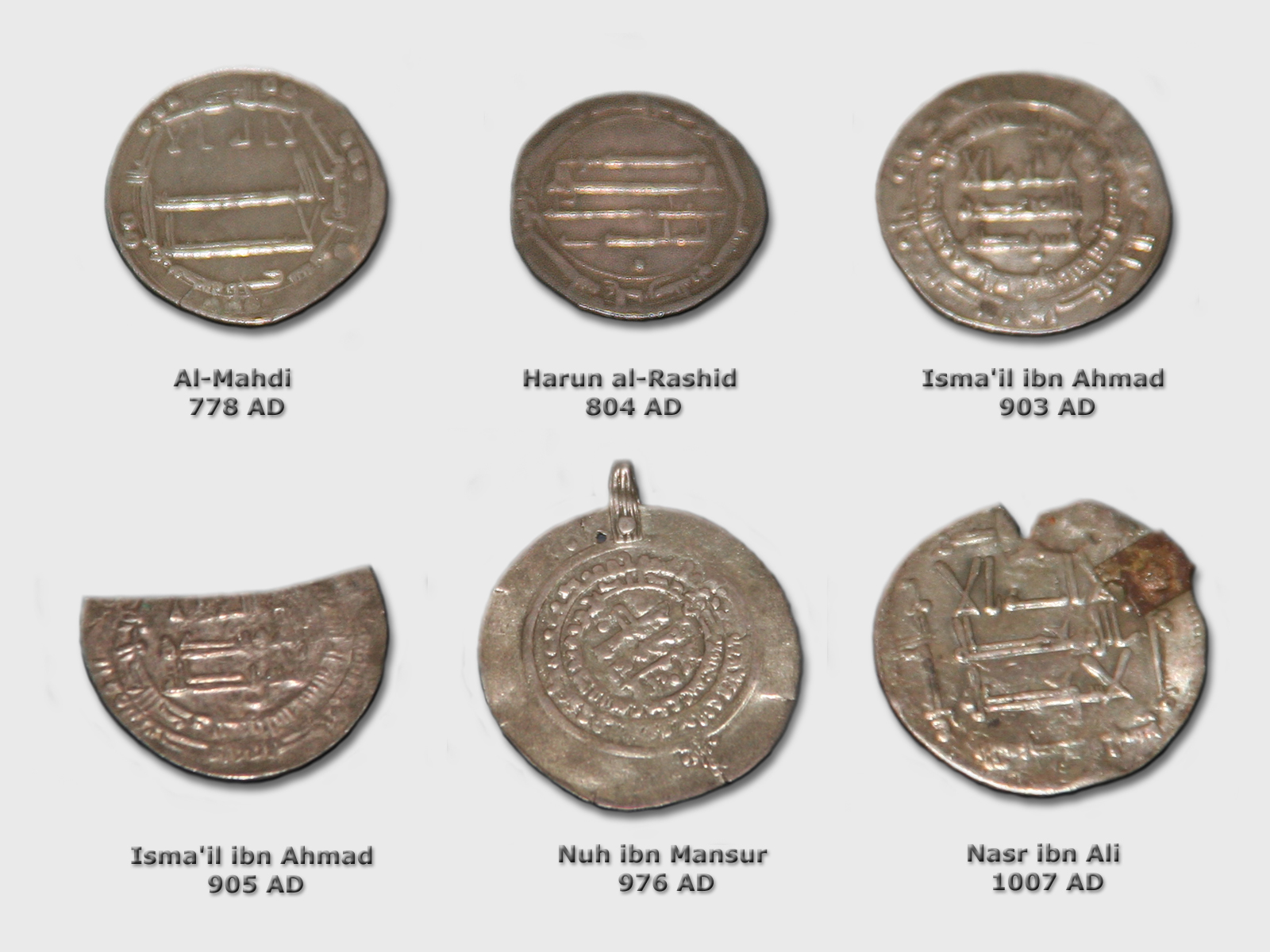
From Dirham hoards in Estonia, 8th–11th centuries

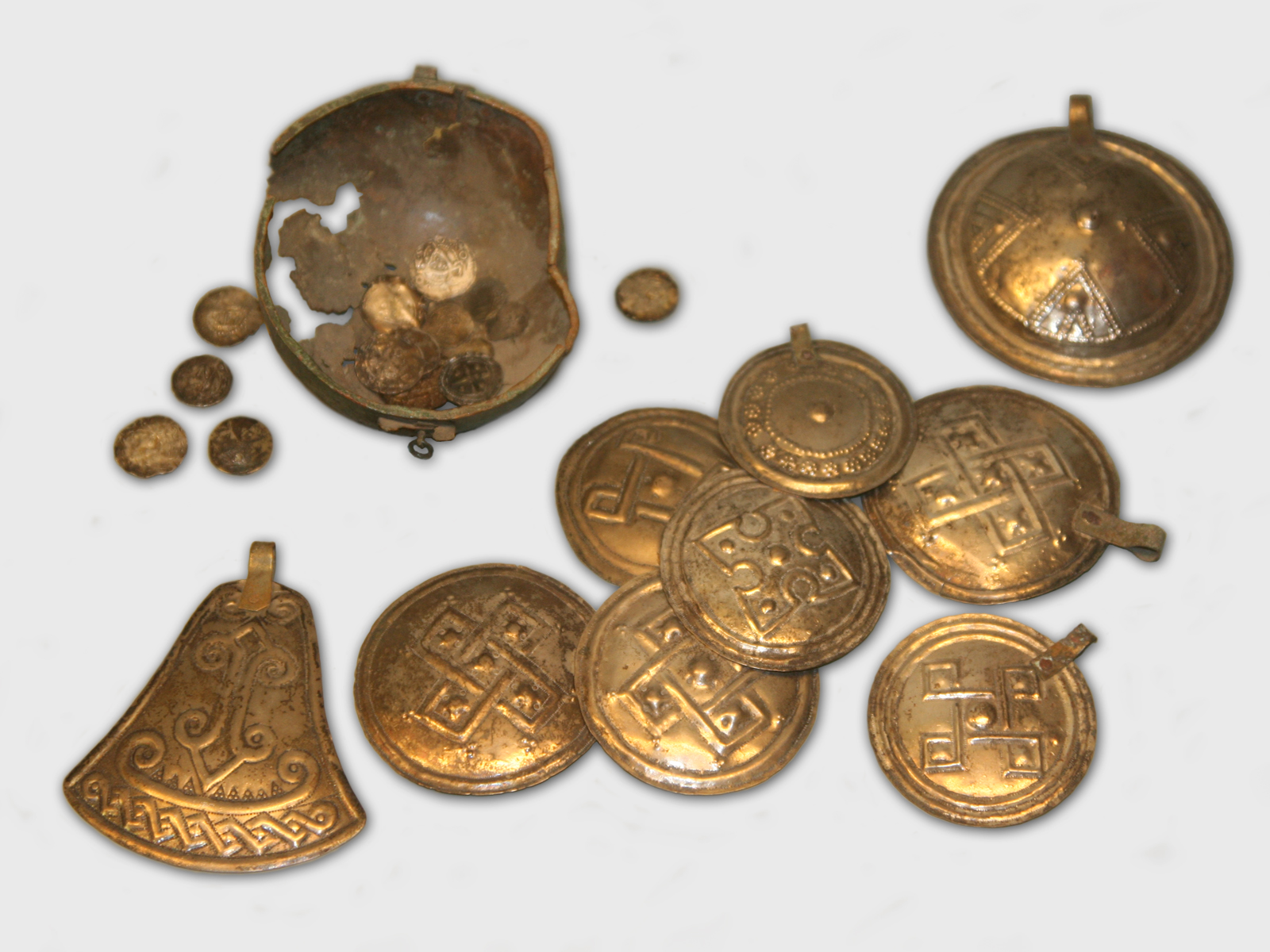
Artifacts of the hoard from Kumna, Estonia

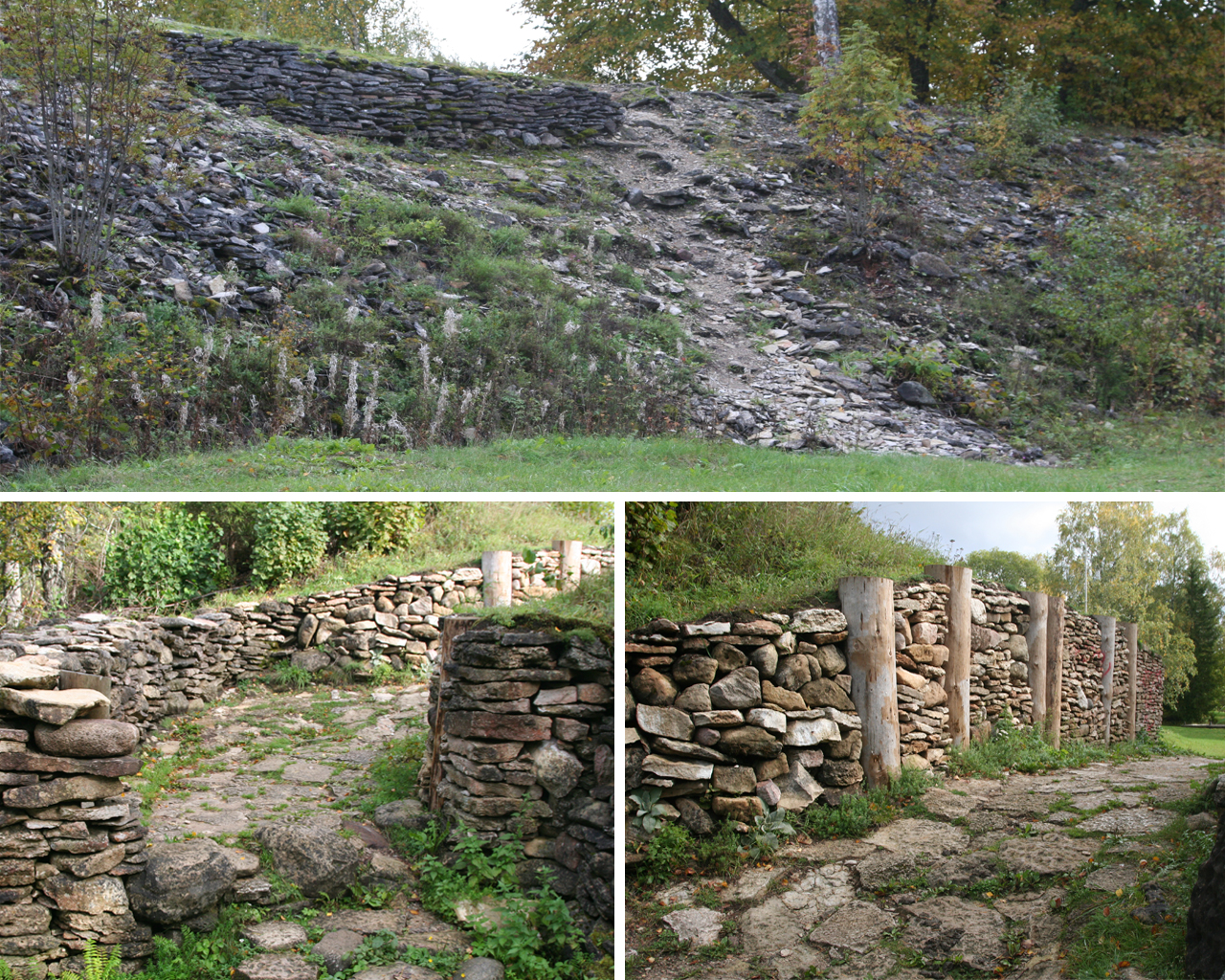
A view of the ruins of the Varbola Stronghold (Latin: Castrum Warbole) in Harju County (Latin: Harria). It was one of the largest circular rampart fortresses and trading centres at the time.
