= Imavere Parish =

Former municipality of Estonia

Coordinates: 58.733°N 25.773°E

Imavere Parish Imavere vald
- Municipality of Estonia
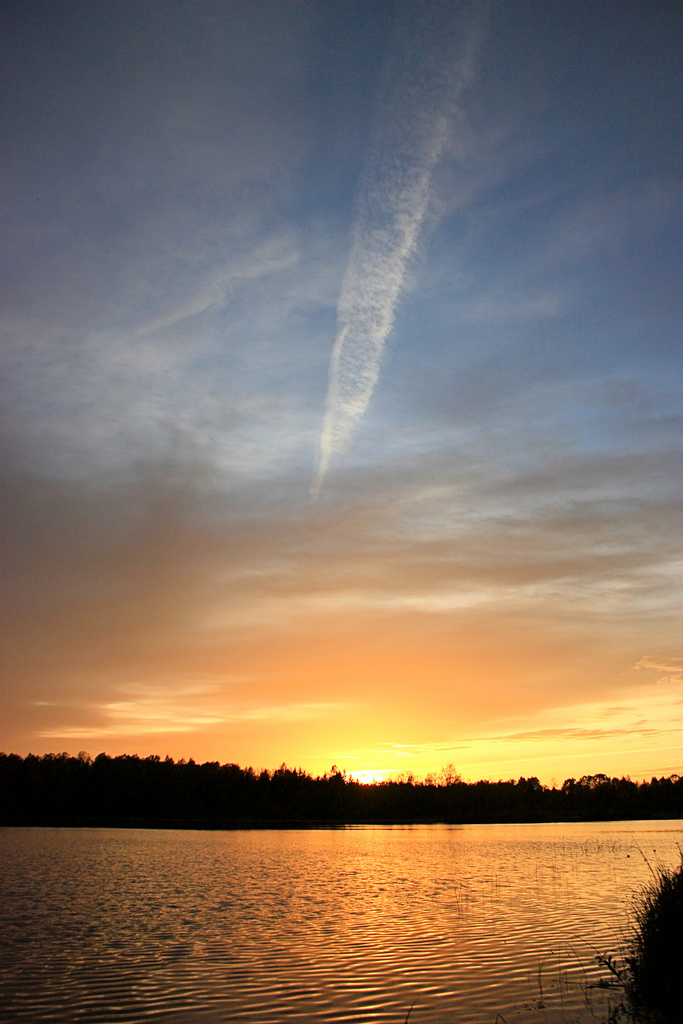
- Eistvere lake

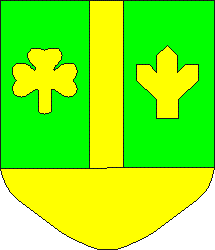
- Flag Coat of arms

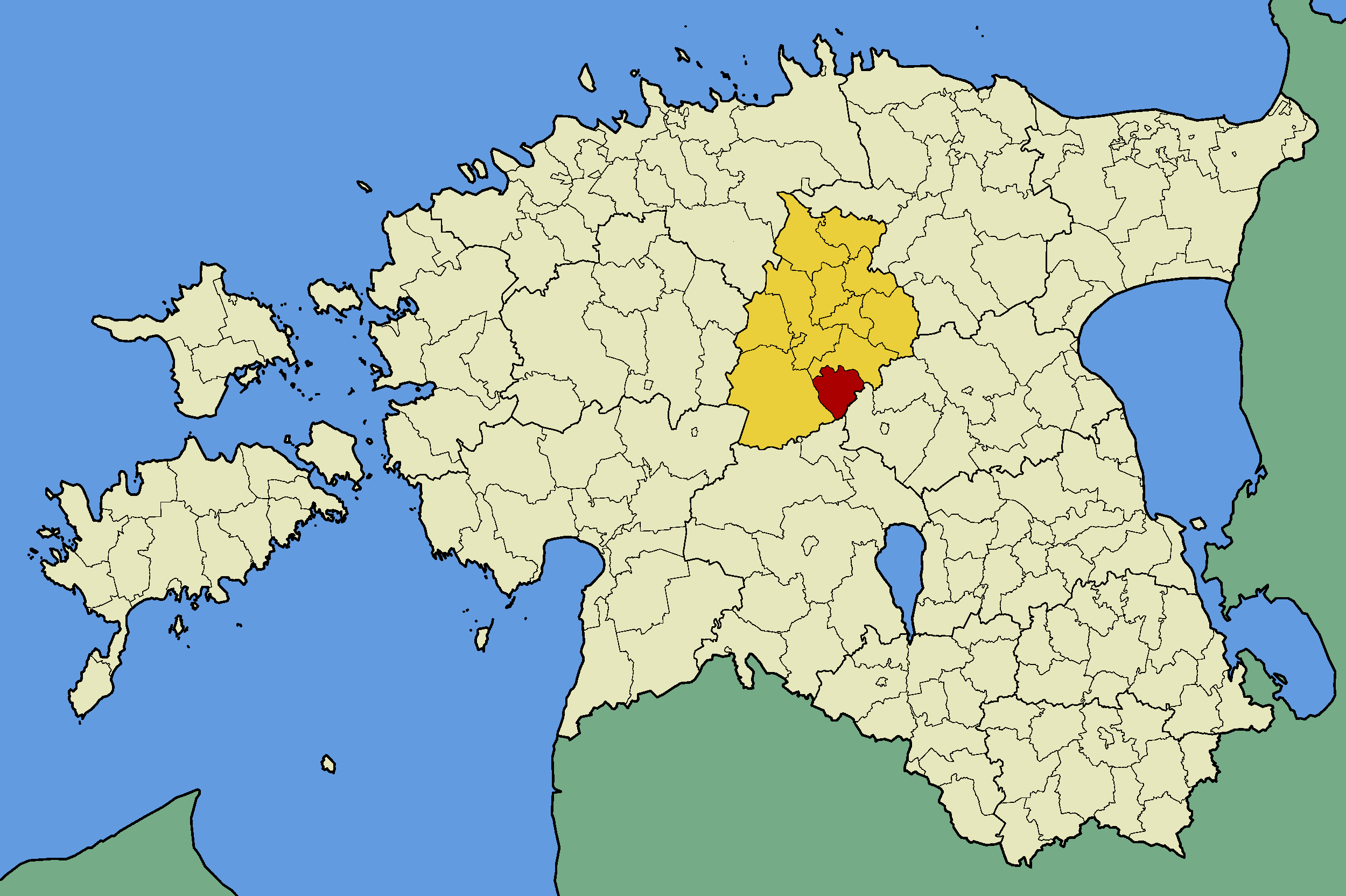
- Imavere Parish within Järva County.
- Country: Estonia
- County: Järva County
- Administrative centre: Imavere

Area
  - Total: 139 km^{2} (54 sq mi)

Population (2006)
  - Total: 1,025
  - Density: 7.37/km^{2} (19.1/sq mi)
- Website: www.imaverevv.ee

Imavere Parish (Estonian: Imavere vald) was a rural municipality of Estonia, in Järva County. It had a population of 1,025 (2006) and an area of 139 km^{2}.

== Villages ==
As of January 2016, Imavere Parish had 13 villages: Eistvere, Hermani, Imavere, Jalametsa, Järavere, Kiigevere, Käsukonna, Laimetsa, Puiatu, Pällastvere, Taadikvere, Tammeküla and Võrevere.
