= Evi Mihkelson =

Estonian freedom fighter (1925 – 2009)

- Born: 6 April 1925; Pilistvere, Põhja-Sakala Parish
- Died: 3 May 2009 (aged 84); Lääne-Viru County, Estonia
- Occupations: freedomfighter; forest sister; (partisan); farmer
- Movement: Estonian anti-Soviet resistance
- Spouse: Heinrich-Rudolph "Heino" Mihkelson (m. ?–1953)
- Awards: Gold Cross of the Order of the Cross of the Eagle

Evi Mihkelson (née Juga; 16 April 1925 – 3 May 2009) was an Estonian freedomfighter or "forest sister". She was a part of the armed anti-Soviet resistance movement in Estonia following the conclusion of the Second World War. She was member of a group of forest brothers (metsavennad), a group of resistance fighters who fought and hid in the forests of Estonia, Latvia, and Lithuania. Mihkelson and her husband were affiliated with Hugo Ruusna's squad and later with Ülo Altermann's squad (Ülo Altermanni salk).

== Early life ==
Mihkelson was born in the village of Pilistvere, Põhja-Sakala Parish near Põltsamaa parish in 1925. She was the daughter of Hans Juga (born Juhanson) and Leena (Helene) Juhanson (née Aas). Mihkelson's father changed the family's last name from Juhanson to Juga because the Estonian government encouraged changing family names and the names of villages and towns from German to Estonian. She also later acquired the surname Mihkelson upon her marriage to Heinrich-Rudolf Mihkelson. She grew up with several siblings, including her sisters Laine Arming and Anni (Johanna) Märtin, and her brothers Jakim Juga and Voldemar Juga, as well as several half-siblings. She worked as a farmer.

Mihkelson married a farmer, Heinrich-Rudolph "Heino" Mihkelson. In October 1944, she gave birth to her daughter, the future novelist and poet Ene Mihkelson, at Kulli Farm in Tammeküla Imavere Parish in Viljandi County.

Her family's agricultural property was designated as a kulak holding by the Soviet authorities. In the summer of 1941, Soviet extermination battalions and local forces clashed near her mother's hometown. Mihkelson's mother and her siblings saw the village being burned as part of the Soviet scorched-earth policy from the vantage point of a nearby bog.

== Career ==
Mihkelson became a partisan or forest sister fighting for a free Estonia in 1949. As Operation Priboi began a mass deportation of state targets to Siberia, Mihkelson and her husband fled into the forests to avoid exile and joined up with a squad of partisans, called Forest brothers. Mihkelson's daughter, Ene, lived with relatives while Mihkelson was in hiding.

Mihkelson's network included several women, such as Aime Juga, Johanna Kirusk, Linda Tamm, Helgi Riimets, Linda Kruleht, and Salme Stamm. Many, like Mihkelson, had gone into hiding to avoid the March 1949 deportation. In the forests, Mihkelson operated alongside other women, such as her sister-in-law Aime Juga and Johanna Martins. Several other individuals served with Mihkelson under Altermann, including Mihkelson's brother Voldemar Juga, Elmar Martins (Johanna Martins' husband), Hans Sapp, and Erich Teor.

=== Activity in the Ruusna and Altermann squads (1949) ===
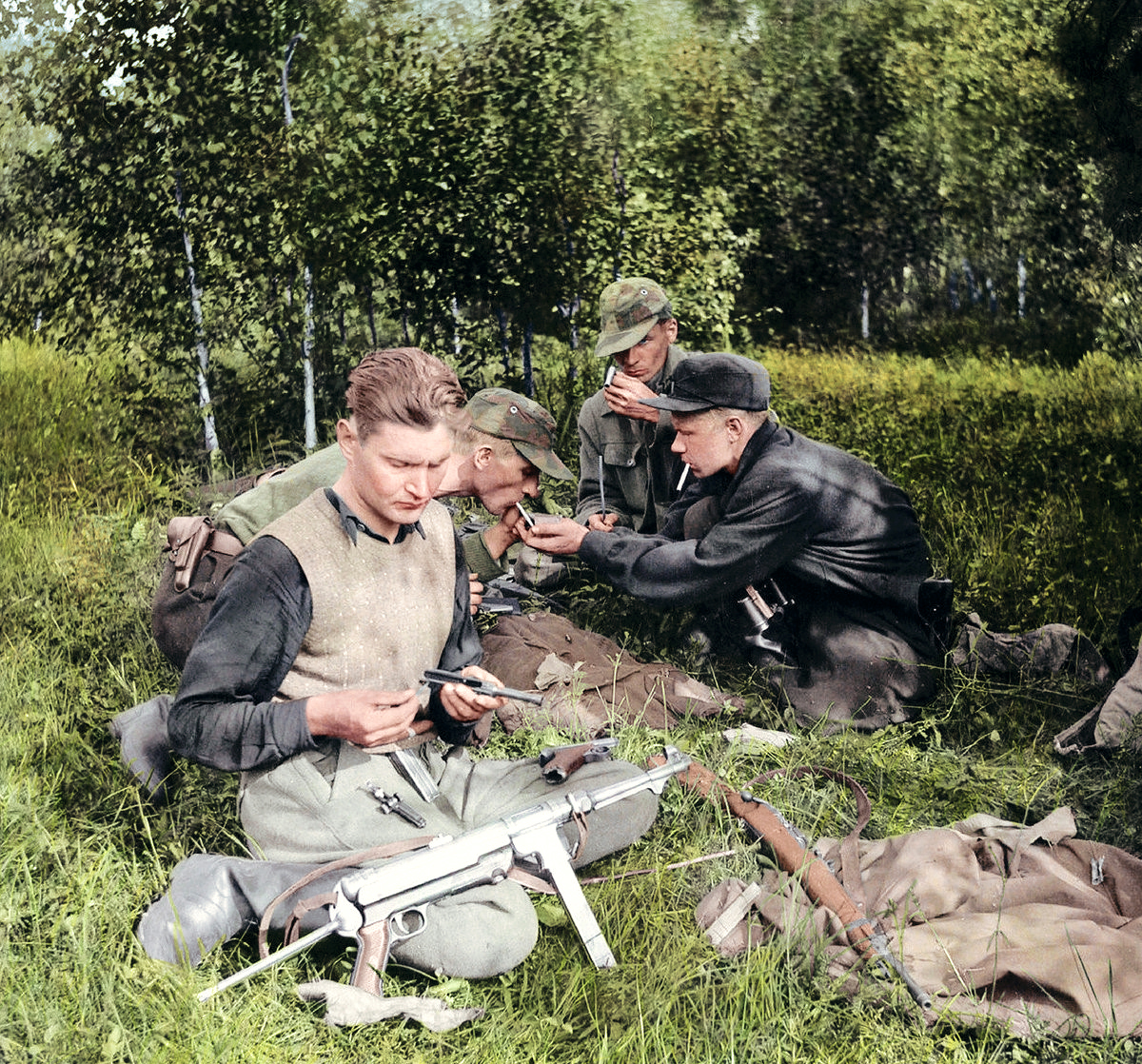
A group of Estonian forest brothers cleaning their guns after a shooting exercise in Veskiaru, Järva County, Estonia, in 1953. Altermann is in the foreground.

Mihkelson and her husband were linked to squads led by Hugo Ruusna and Ülo Altermann. The Altermann squad was a resistance unit that operated from 1948 until the late 1954 across Järva and Põltsamaa counties. The group was led by Altermann, a veteran of the Estonian SS Legion who fought at the Battle of the Tannenberg Line. The group consisted of individuals evading Soviet mobilisation, deportations, and political arrests.

To sustain an underground unit of nearly a dozen people over six years, the squad routinely raided Soviet infrastructure. In October 1952, the squad executed an armed robbery of the Soviet state-run Kütimäe Cooperative Store in the Põltsamaa district, seizing goods and provisions valued at 25,000 rubles. The raids on the Peetri Cooperative Store in the Põltsamaa district and the Oisu butter factory in the Türi district between April and May 1953, yielded food supplies valued at approximately 50,000 rubles in total. They also raided local collectivised Soviet farms (kolhoos), such as the "Kiir" and "Suureküla" kolkhozes, forcibly taking cattle and grain to feed their group and sympathetic locals. The group also engaged in occasional acts of sabotage against Soviet infrastructure, including a monument to Lenin, which was blown up in 1953.

The Altermann and Ruusna squads linked together approximately one hundred individuals. In early 1953, Mihkelson was still in hiding with Ruusna's group, as known to Soviet authorities. When Linda Tamm was captured by Soviet authorities, they questioned her. Based on the information she gave them, they determined that at least three branches of the group were hiding in different locations. At this point, the authorities knew that Mihkelson was hiding with her husband, her brother, her sister-in-law, and Elmar Martins. They were hiding in a bunker in the forest near Päinurme. Following Ruusna's death during a raid on 16 March 1953, Soviet security documents began attributing the group mainly to Altermann.

=== Activity in Lõimetsa and death of husband Heino Mihkelson (1953) ===
A military operation was organized in February 1953 to try to capture the Altermann group. On 16 February 1953, KGB surveillance units and an MGB operational branch tracked the squad to Lõimetsa village. While the Soviet troops ambushed, Sapp and Mihkelson's husband, Heinrich Mihkelson, managed to kill MVD soldier Orehhov. The group of forest brothers also fatally wounded Private Kukuškin. Sapp managed to escape, however, in the firefight, Mihkelson's husband, Heino, was killed.

Following her husband's death, Mihkelson was still with the group in the summer of 1953. They documented some of their activity that year through photographs they took on a camera they gained during a raid. These images were taken while they stayed in a bunker in Tamsi forest.

=== Activity near Päinurme and death of group leader Altermann (1954) ===
Mihkelson herself managed to evade the authorities for several more years. However, sustained pressure from the Soviets eventually compromised the squad. On 17 April 1954, the KGB successfully found the group using intelligence from a member of the group. They recruited the squad's external supply runner, Lembit Markus, who had been recruited as an informant by Soviet security in 1953. Markus turned on the group with the help of squad member Johanna Martins. Markus lured Altermann into an ambush near Päinurme, where the commander was shot dead. Following Altermann's death, the squad dissolved.

=== Legalisation (1955) ===
Following the ambush and disbandment of the squad, Mihkelson began hiding with group member Hans Sapp. By late 1954, Mihkelson and Sapp were the only ones who still remained in hiding from their former group.

Sapp recalled meeting with Mihkelson in the autumn of 1955, during which she expressed her intention to emerge from hiding and legalise her status before the year ended. Sapp felt that the clandestine life in the forest had impacted Mihkelson's wellbeing.

Mihkelson had sought guidance from her brother, who suggested that since she was not responsible for serious crimes against the state, she might be able to hand herself in with minimal punishment, especially as former prisoners were already beginning to return from Siberia. However, fearing that security forces might coerce information from her under duress, and to prevent Mihkelson from inadvertently giving away his position, Sapp decided to relocate from his known bunker to an unknown position.

While Mihkelson had continued to hide in the forest along with Sapp, the other surviving group members eventually emerged from hiding through the Soviet legaliseerus (legalisation) process, which allowed certain insurgent fighters and evaders to surrender and register with the authorities. Mihkelson was the second-to-last member to come forward. Mihkelson was legalised on 30 December 1955. She avoided harsh punishment following her re-emergence.

The Soviets initially tried to use Mihkelson as an asset to draw out Sapp. She was tasked by the Soviets with convincing squad member Sapp to legalise, a task which she put minimal effort into. Sapp remained in hiding for nearly three more years, finally surrendering to the Soviets on 7 September 1958, making him the last member of the squad to surrender. Mihkelson had failed to provide any information regarding Sapp's possible whereabouts to the authorities.

== Death and legacy ==
Mihkelson died at the age of 84 in Lääne-Viru County.

Initially, when Mihkelson and her husband Heino fled to the forest in 1949, they were forced to leave behind their four-year-old daughter, Ene, who later became a writer. Growing up with the stigma of being the child of "bandits," Ene wrote a semi-autobiographical work about a daughter trying to uncover the true story of her parents who served as Forest Brothers called Ahasveeruse uni ("The Dream of Ahasuerus"). The novel was voted the best Estonian novel published since the restoration of independence. The book grapples with the psychological weight of betrayal and historical memory.

== See also ==
- Alice Kuperjanov
- Ene Mihkelson
- Guerrilla war in the Baltic states
- Occupation of the Baltic states
