= Navesti Landscape Conservation Area =

Former nature park in Estonia

- Location within Estonia
- Location: Estonia
- Coordinates: 58°35′N 25°21′E
- Area: 168 ha (420 acres)
- Established: 1992 (2009)

Navesti Landscape Protected Area is the name of a former nature park located in SuureJaani Rural Municipality in Viljandi County, Estonia. It was managed by the Estonian Environmental Board (Estonian: Keskkonnaamet) as part of its Estonian Conservancy Areas (Est.:Eesti kaitsealad) program. The main objective of the conservation area was the protection of the Navesti orund dune landforms.

According to a 2012 Keskkonnaamet publication (see external link), the area's 168 hectares were "taken under nature conservation in 1992 in order to protect the Vanaõue dunes and biodiversity and to maintain the landscape of the Navesti [River] Valley".

In 1998, the government of Estonia adopted an amended resolution that further defined the "protection regulations and descriptions of the external boundaries of Navesti and Papioru landscape protection areas".

The Navesti Landscape Protected Area Protection Regulation was repealed in 2022.
