= Nurmekund =

Ancient county of Estonia

Nurmekund Nurmekund
- Migration period–1224
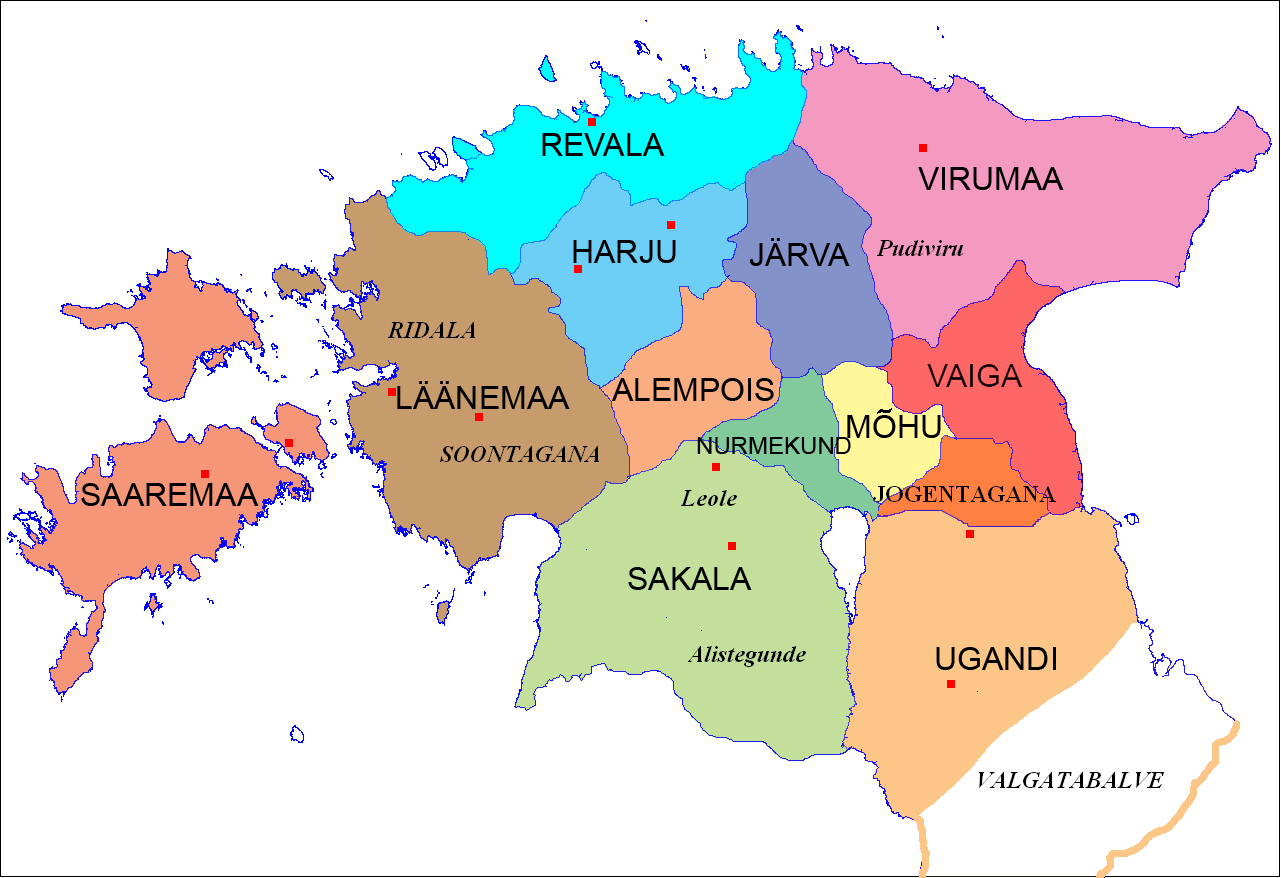
- Ancient Estonia, Nurmekund is dark green.
- Capital: Pilistvere; 58°39′46″N 25°44′56″E
- Common languages: Old Estonian
- Religion: Estonian paganism, Thor cult
- Elder
- History
  - Established: Migration period
  - Disestablished: 1224
Succeeded by
Monastic state of the Teutonic Knights

Nurmekund (Low German: Nurmegunde) was a small independent country (ancient Estonian county) on the north coast of Lake Võrtsjärv in Central Estonia, bordered by Sakala, Alempois, Järvamaa, Mõhu, and Ugandi. Nurmekund had an area of approximately 600 hides.

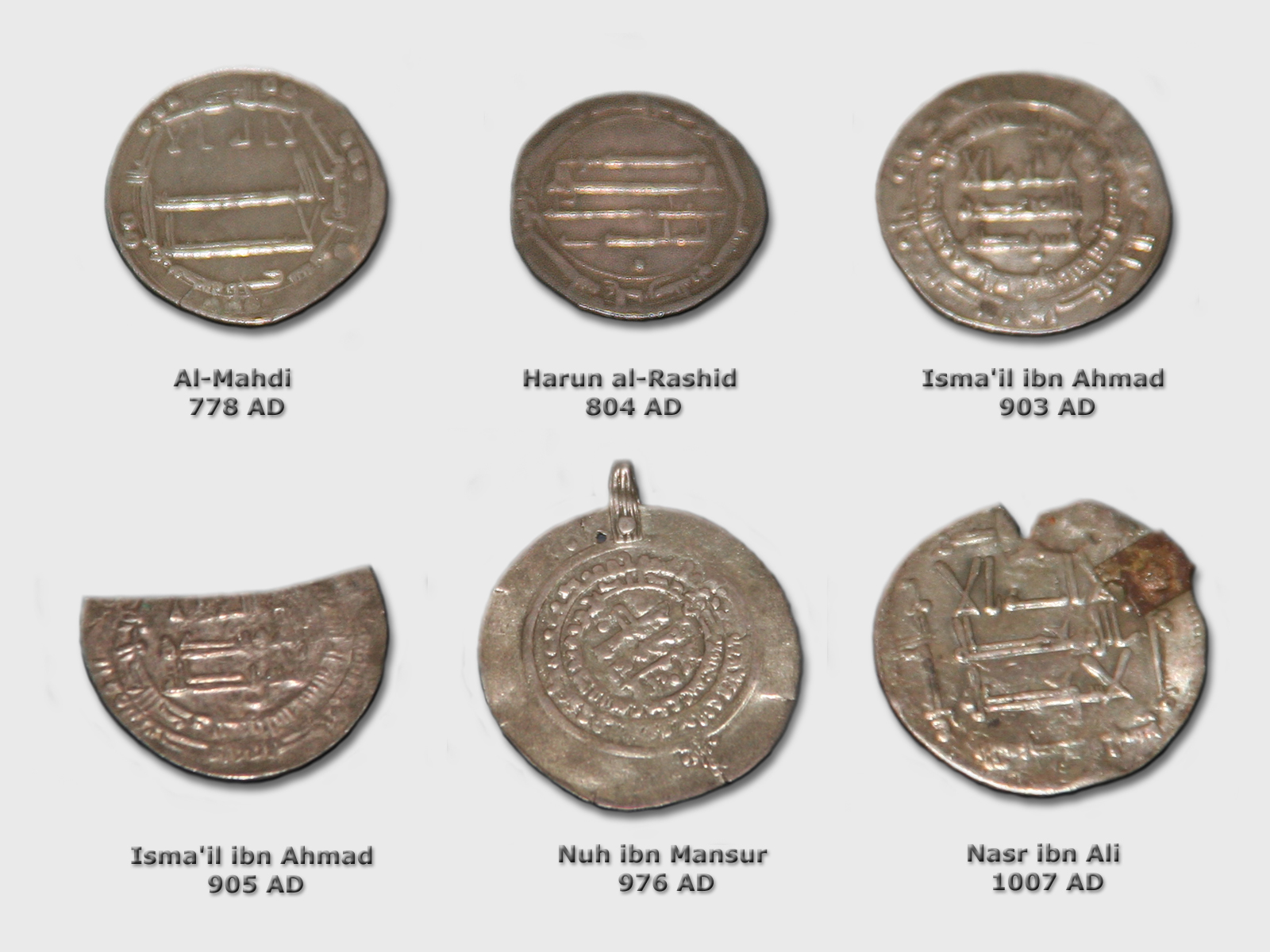
From Dirham hoards in Estonia.

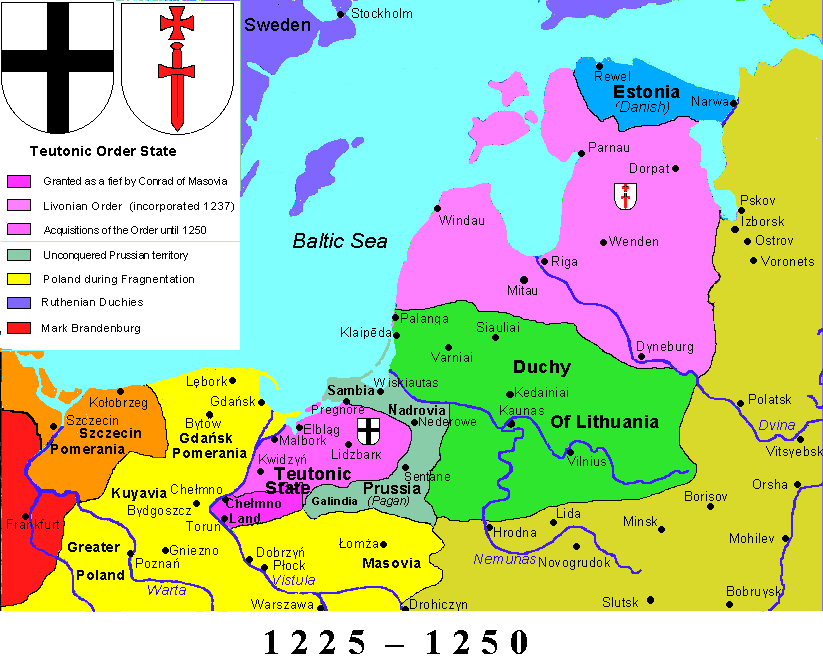
Monastic state of the Teutonic Knights, 1225 - 1250.

Livonia in 1260.

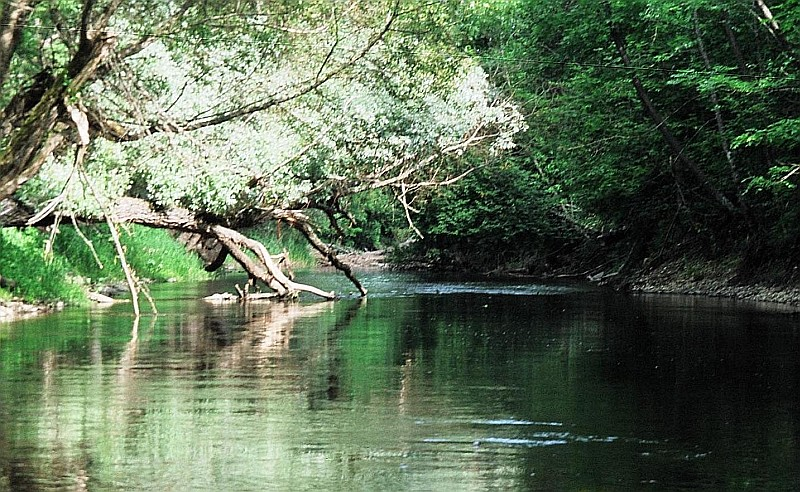
Põltsamaa river, the border river of Nurmekund, in 2005.

== See also ==
- History of Estonia
- Imavere
- Kabala
- Kolga-Jaani
- Kõo
- Livonian Crusade
- Monastic state of the Teutonic Knights
- Pilistvere
- Põltsamaa
- Rulers of Estonia
- Võhma
