= Jaan Jung =

Estonian historian

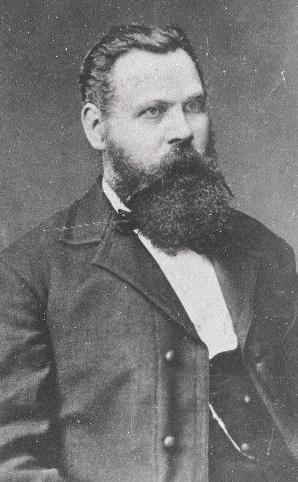
Jaan Jung

Jaan Jung (18 November 1835 Tammeküla, Pilistvere Parish – 26 June 1900 Tamme, Imavere Parish) was an Estonian educator, cultural figure, and archeology and history enthusiast.

From 1854 to 1856 he studied at Pilistvere parish school. From 1867 to 1899 he was the organist at Halliste Congregation. From 1857 to 1896 he taught at Kaidi School, located in Abja Parish.

He was a member of many Estonian national societies, such as the Society of Estonian Literati.

In 1874 he started to register archeological objects located in Estonia.

== Works ==
- Liiwimaa kuningas Magnus ja Wene Zaar Joann Wassiljewitsh IV ehk tükike Wene- ja Läänemere maade ajalugust aastast 1530 kunni 1584. Tartu, 1874
- Mönda Isamaa wanust aegust. Tartu, 1874
- Rootslaste wäljarändamine Hiiumaalt aastal 1781, ja teiste Eestimaal elawa Rootslaste loust aastast 1345 kunni 1800. Tartu, 1875
- Liiwlaste würst Kaupo, ja sõdimised tema päewil, kui ka Liiwi rahwast ja nende kadumisest siin maal. Tartu, 1876
- Sõda Wolmari linna al ja Rakwere linna õnnetu kadumine. Tartu, 1876
- Jutustused Türgi sõaplatsist. Viljandi, 1877
- Sakala maa ja Wiliandi lossi ja linna aja loust : Lõpetuses mõned Wiliandi maa rahwa wanad jutud. Tartu, 1878
- Eesti rahwa wanast usust, kombedest ja juttudest. Tartus, 1879
- Järwa maa ja Paide lossi ja linna aja loust. Tartu, 1879
- Nurmegunde maa ja Põltsama lossi ja linna aja loust. Tartu, 1879
- Über einige Altertümer aus dem Kirchspiel Hallist und der Umgegend im Pernauschen Kreise Livlands. Dorpat, 1882
- Õntsa dr. Martin Luteruse elu lugu : Luteruse 400 aastase sündmise pääwa mälestuseks. Tartu, 1883
- Halliste ja Karksi kirikute ja kihelkondade ajalugu : Halliste kiriku 25-aastase juubileumi mälestuseks. Tartu, 1893
- Muinasaja teadus Eestlaste maal. I (II) osa : kohalised muinasaja kirjeldused Liiwimaalt, Pernu ja Wiljandi maakonnast. Tartu, 1898; [Faksiimiletr.]. Tallinn, 2000
- Muinasaja teadus Eestlaste maalt. I, Üleüldine muinasaja kirjeldus. Tartu, 1899
- Muinasaja teadus Eestlaste maalt. II, Kohalised muinasaja kirjeldused Liiwimaalt, Pernu ja Wiljandi. Tartu, 1899
- Muinasajateadus eestlaste maalt : III, Kohalised muinasaja kirjeldused Tallinnamaalt. Tallinn, 1910
