= Puiatu =

Puiatu may refer to several places in Estonia:

- Puiatu, Lääne County, village in Haapsalu, Lääne County
- Puiatu, Järva Parish, village in Järva Parish, Järva County
- Puiatu, Paide, village in Paide, Järva County
- Puiatu, Jõgeva County, village in Põltsamaa Parish, Jõgeva County
- Puiatu, Viljandi County, village in Viljandi Parish, Viljandi County
