= Navesti (river) =

River in Estonia

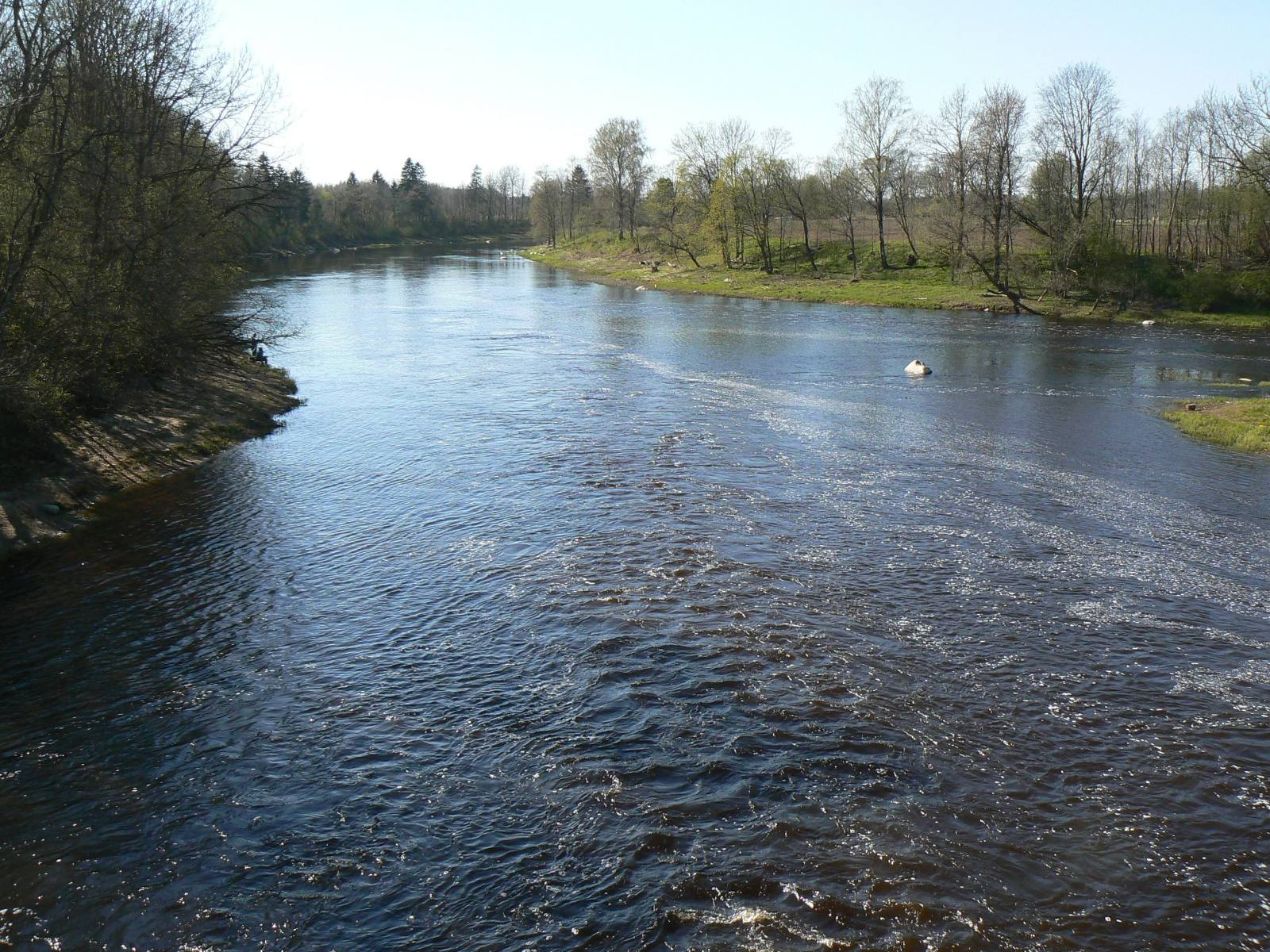
- The Navesti as it empties into the Pärnu

Location
- Country: Estonia

Physical characteristics
- Source
  - location: near Imavere
  - coordinates: 58°45′40.5″N 25°43′37.8″E
  - elevation: 60.2 m (198 ft)
- Mouth
  - location: Pärnu
  - coordinates: 58°29′37.2″N 24°53′59.1″E
- Length: 100 km (62 mi)
- Basin size: 3,000 km^{2} (1,200 sq mi)
- Discharge
  - average: 27.9 m^{3}/s (990 cu ft/s)

Basin features
- Tributaries
  - left: Halliste River, Räsna stream
  - right: Saarjõgi, Retla River, Räpu River

The Navesti (also known as Pala or Paala) is a 100 km (62 mi)-long-river in southwestern Estonia. It is the largest river by discharge that empties into the Pärnu (at its mouth the discharge is almost equal to that of the Pärnu). The source of the Navesti is near Imavere (between the villages of Jalametsa and Käsukonna) in Järva County. It flows generally west, and passes through three counties (Järva, Viljandi, and Pärnu). Its confluence with the Pärnu is located near Tori in Jõesuu. The basin area of the Navesti is 3,000 km^{2} (1,200 sq mi) and its average discharge 27.9 m^{3}/s (990 cu ft/s).

Before the opening of primeval Lake Võrts through the Emajõgi to Lake Peipus, the Navesti River drained the Võrtsjärv.

== Fishes ==
There are up to 18 species of fish in the Navesti, including bream, burbot, chub, dace, ide, perch, pike, river trout, roach, and ruffe.

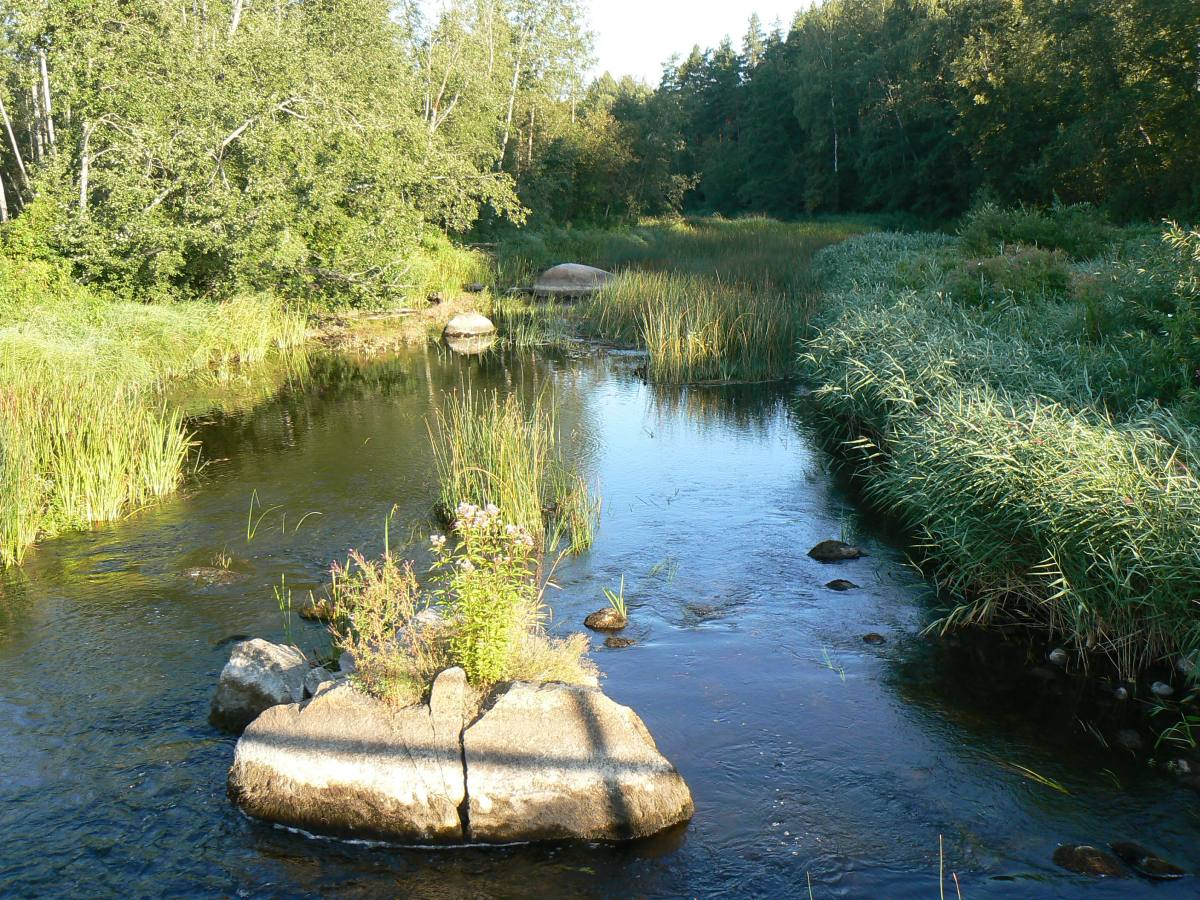
