= Tammeküla =

Village in Estonia

Coordinates: 58°47′N 25°43′E

- Village
- Interactive map of Tammeküla
- Country: Estonia
- County: Järva County
- Parish: Järva Parish
- Time zone: UTC+2 (EET)
  - Summer (DST): UTC+3 (EEST)

Tammeküla is a village in Järva Parish, Järva County in central Estonia.

== Name ==
Tammeküla was attested in historical sources as Tamakula in 1583, Tammekil in 1624, and Tamme in 1797. The name is a compound of the word tamm 'oak' and küla 'village', thus meaning 'oak village', presumably referring to the local vegetation.

== Notable people ==
Notable people that were born or lived in Tammeküla include the following:

- Jaan Jung (1835–1900), educator, archeologist, and historian
- Ene Mihkelson (1944–2017), writer
