= Lists of political office-holders in Estonia =

These are lists of political office-holders in Estonia.

== Overview ==
The ancient counties (maakond) and parishes (kihelkond) were headed by Seniores and Meliores (Elders) as noted by Henry of Livonia. The administrative jurisdiction of the parish and county elders was limited, the counties themselves remained autonomous until the Teutonic and Danish conquest of Estonia in the 13th century. Ending with the states and the rulers of states (starting from the time of the first successful Danish conquest in 1219) who either ruled or laid claims of sovereignty over some parts of the territory of present-day Estonia, as well as the leaders of the independent Republic of Estonia since 1918.

== Ancient counties ==
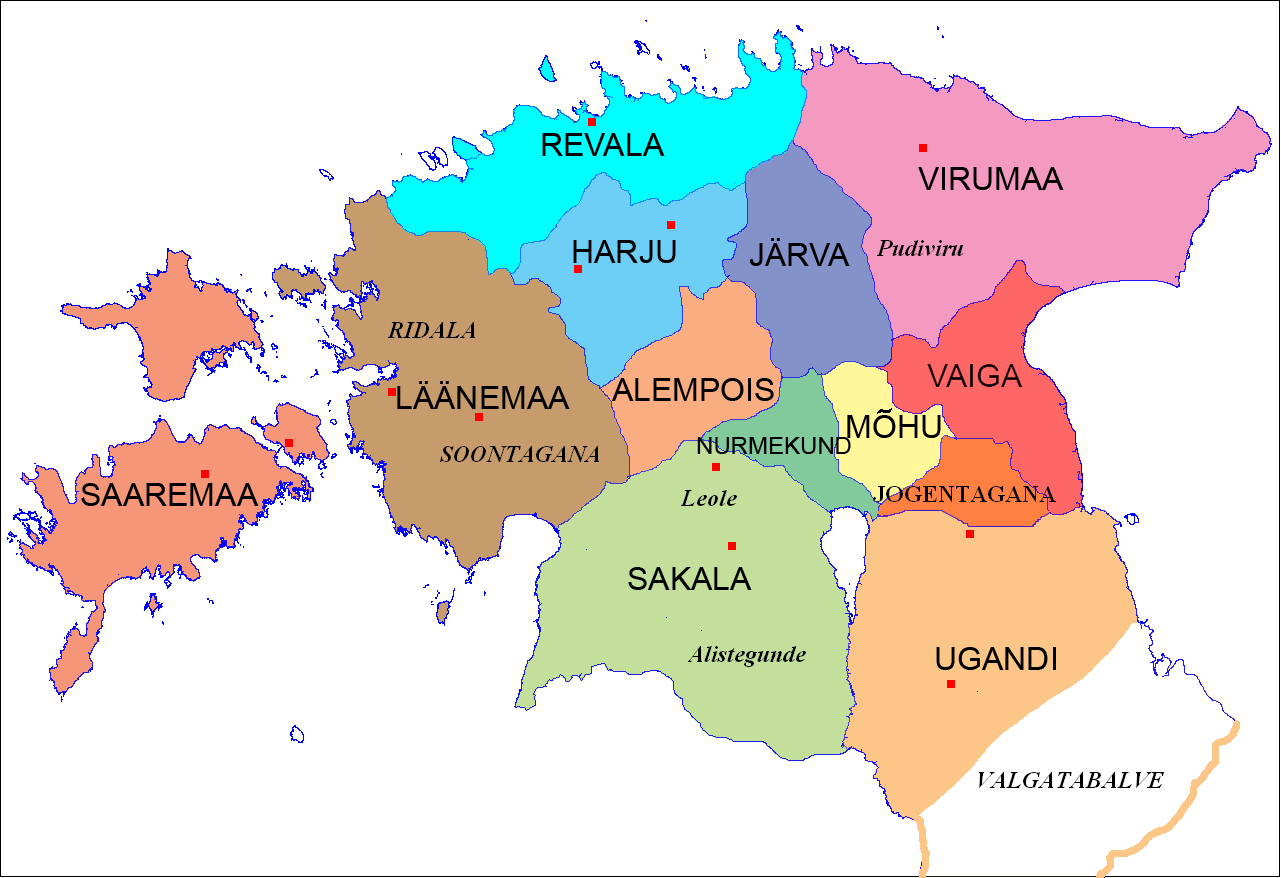
Counties of Ancient Estonia

=== Alempois ===
Title: Elder (-1224)

=== Harju ===
Title: Elder (-1224)

=== Järva ===
Title: Elder (-1224)

=== Jogentagana ===
Title: Elder (-1224)

=== Läänemaa ===
Title: Elder (-1224)

=== Mõhu ===
Title: Elder (-1224)

=== Nurmekund ===
Title: Elder (-1224)

=== Revala ===
Title: Elder (-1224)

=== Saaremaa ===
Title: Elder – It is probable that these men, whose names appear on a treaty with the Order of the Brethren of the Sword in 1251, were the chiefs of administrative units on Saaremaa, Muhu, and Sõrve. Their "signatures" were, in all likelihood, phonetically "Latinized" by the authors of the document.

- Ylle
- Culle
- Enu
- Muntelene
- Tappete
- Yalde
- Melete
- Cake

=== Sakala ===
Title: Elder (-1223)

- before 1211–21 September 1217 Lembitu
- 21 September 1217 – ? Unnepeve
- Meeme

=== Ugandi ===
Title: Elder (-1224)

=== Vaiga ===
Title: Elder (-1224)

=== Virumaa ===
Title: Elder (-1224)

- Kyriavanus
- Tabelinus

== Kings of Estonia during Saint George's Night Uprising ==
- The Four Kings (1343)
- Vesse (1344)

== Imperial Russian governorates of Reval and Estonia (1721–1917) ==
The Reval Governorate and the Governorate of Estonia were part of the Russian Empire (1721–1917).

== World War I temporary governments ==
=== Russian Provisional Government, 1917 ===
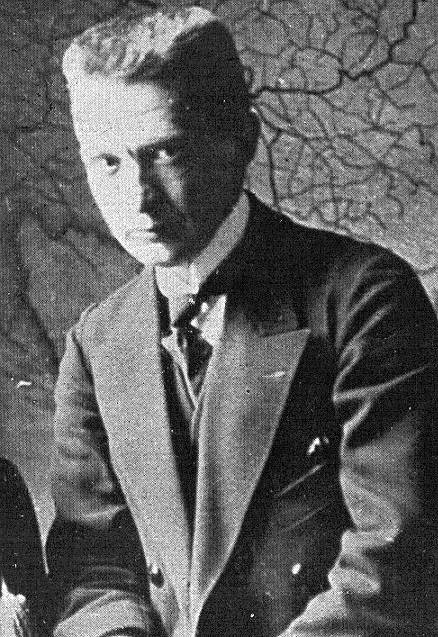
Alexander Kerensky

Title: Chairman (1917)

- Georgy Evgenyevich Lvov (15 March (2 March) – 21 July (8 July) 1917)

Title: Prime Minister (1917)

- Alexander Kerensky (21 July (8 July) – 7 November (25 October) 1917)

=== Soviet Executive Committee of Estonia 1917 ===
(independent de facto)

Title: Chairman of the Soviet Executive Committee of Estonia (Eestimaa Nõukogude Täitevkomitee esimees) (1917–18)

- Jaan Anvelt (5 November (23 October) 1917 – 4 March 1918)

(independent de jure)

Title: Gouvernement Commissioner (Kubermangukomissar) (1917–18)

- Jaan Poska (28 November (15 November) 1917 – 24 February 1918)

== Republic of Estonia ==
=== Chairman of the Supreme Council of the Republic of Estonia (1990–1992) ===
Title: Chairman of the Supreme Council of the Republic of Estonia (in the body of Soviet Union) (1990–91)

- Arnold Rüütel (8 May 1990 – 20 August 1991)

Title: Chairman of the Supreme Council of the Republic of Estonia (Eesti Vabariigi Ülemnõukogu esimees) (1991–92)

- Arnold Rüütel (20 August 1991 – 6 October 1992)

== United Baltic Duchy ==
Title: Regent Councillor (1918)

- Adolf Pilar von Pilchau (9–19 November 1918)

== Commune of the Working People of Estonia ==
Title: Chairman of the Council of The Commune of the Working People of Estonia (Eesti Töörahva Komuuna Nõukogu esimees) (1918–19)

- Jaan Anvelt (29 November 1918 – 5 June 1919)

== Estonia during the Soviet occupation ==
Title: Chairman of the Presidium of the Supreme Soviet of Estonian SSR (Eesti NSV Ülemnõukogu Presiidiumi esimees) (1940–88)

- Johannes Vares-Barbarus (21 July 1940 – 29 November 1946)
- Nigol Andresen (1946–47)
- Eduard Päll (1947–50)
- August Jakobson (1950–58)
- Johan Eichfeld (1958–61)
- Aleksei Müürisepp (1961 – 7 October 1970)
- Aleksander Ansberg (1970)
- Artur Vader (22 December 1970 – 25 May 1978)
- Meta Vannas (acting chairman; 1978)
- Johannes Käbin (1978–83)
- Arnold Rüütel (8 April 1983 – 8 May 1990)

Title: Chairman of the Presidium of the Supreme Council of the Republic of Estonia (1990–1992)

- Arnold Rüütel (8 May 1990 – 6 October 1992)

== Soviet Union ==
Title: Secretary General of the Central Committee of the Communist Party of the Soviet Union (1940–91)

- Joseph Stalin (1940–53)
- Nikita Khrushchev (1953–64)
- Leonid Brezhnev (1964–82)
- Yuri Andropov (1982–84)
- Konstantin Chernenko (1984–85)
- Mikhail Gorbachev (1985–91)

== Reichskommissariat Ostland ==
Title: Führer und Reichskanzler (1941–44)

- Adolf Hitler (7 July 1941 – 24 November 1944)

Title: Generalkomissar für Estland (1941–44)

- Karl-Siegmund Litzmann (5 December 1941 – 18 September 1944)

Title: Eesti Omavalitsuse juht (1941–45)

- Hjalmar Mäe (15 September 1941 – 4 January 1945)

== See also ==
- History of Estonia
- President of Estonia
- List of Swedish monarchs
- List of Russian monarchs
- Lists of office-holders
