= Alempois =

Ancient county in Estonia

- Alempois of Ancient Estonia
- 1224
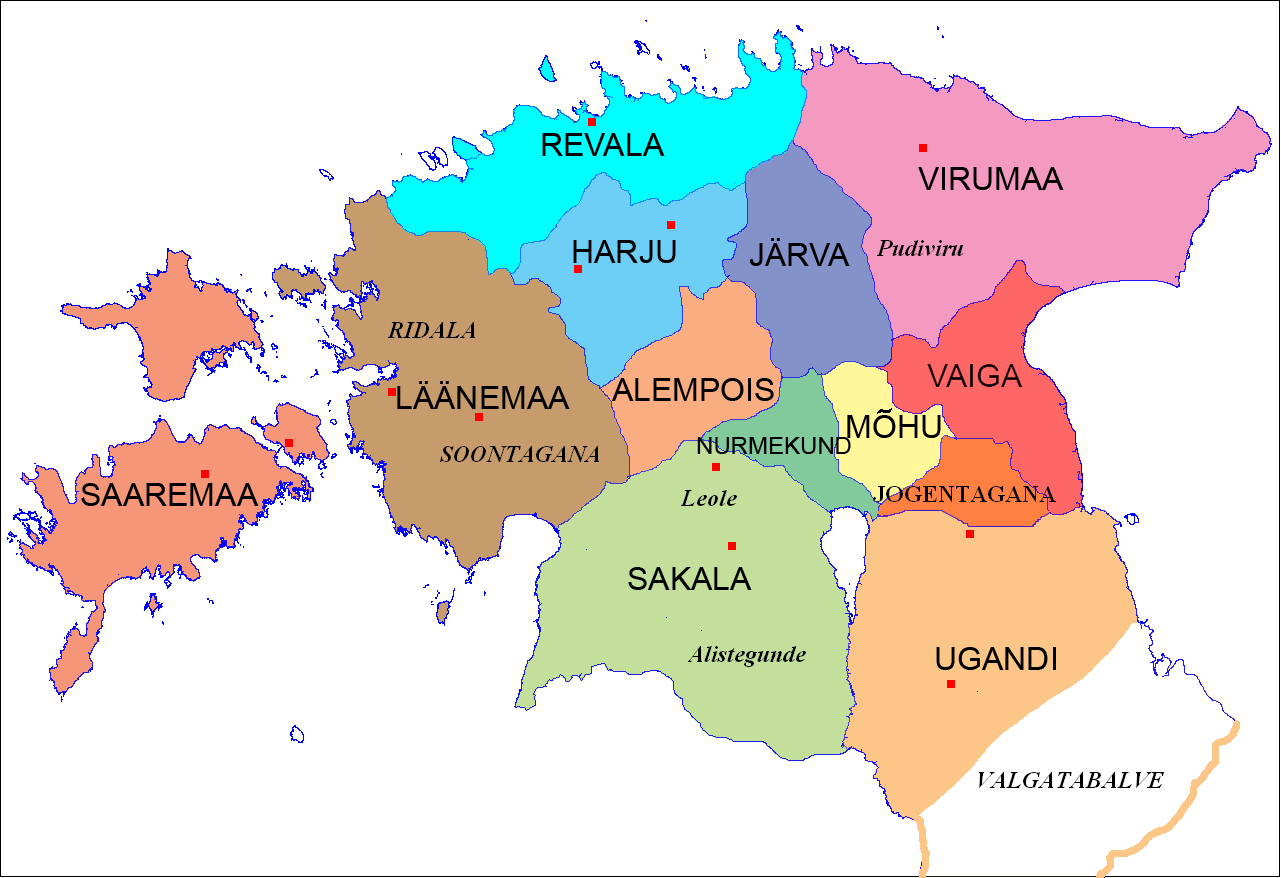
- Ancient Estonian counties in 1214.
- Area
  - Coordinates: 58°50′N 25°30′E
  - Type: Council of Elders
Succeeded by
Monastic state of the Teutonic Knights
- Proto-Estonian, Estonian paganism, Thor cult

Alempois (Latin: Alumbus) was a small independent landlocked county in ancient Estonia, bordered by Harjumaa, Järvamaa, Nurmekund, Sakala, and Läänemaa. Alempois had an area of approximately 400 hides.

== See also ==
- Livonian Crusade
- Monastic state of the Teutonic Knights
- Mädara
- Rulers of Estonia
- Türi
- Vahastu
- Wittenstein
