= Jõesuu, Pärnu County =

Village in Estonia

Jõesuu
- Village
- Location in Estonia
- Coordinates: 58°29′34″N 24°53′45″E
- Country: Estonia
- County: Pärnu County
- Municipality: Tori Parish

Population (2003)
  - Total: 389

Jõesuu is a village in Tori Parish, Pärnu County in southwestern Estonia.

== Location ==
It is located on the confluence of Navesti and Pärnu rivers, about 5 km (3 mi) east of Tori, the centre of the municipality.

== Population ==
Jõesuu has a population of 389 (as of 2003).

== Name ==
The name Jõesuu means 'river mouth' in Estonian and refers to the mouth of the Navesti River.

== Gallery ==
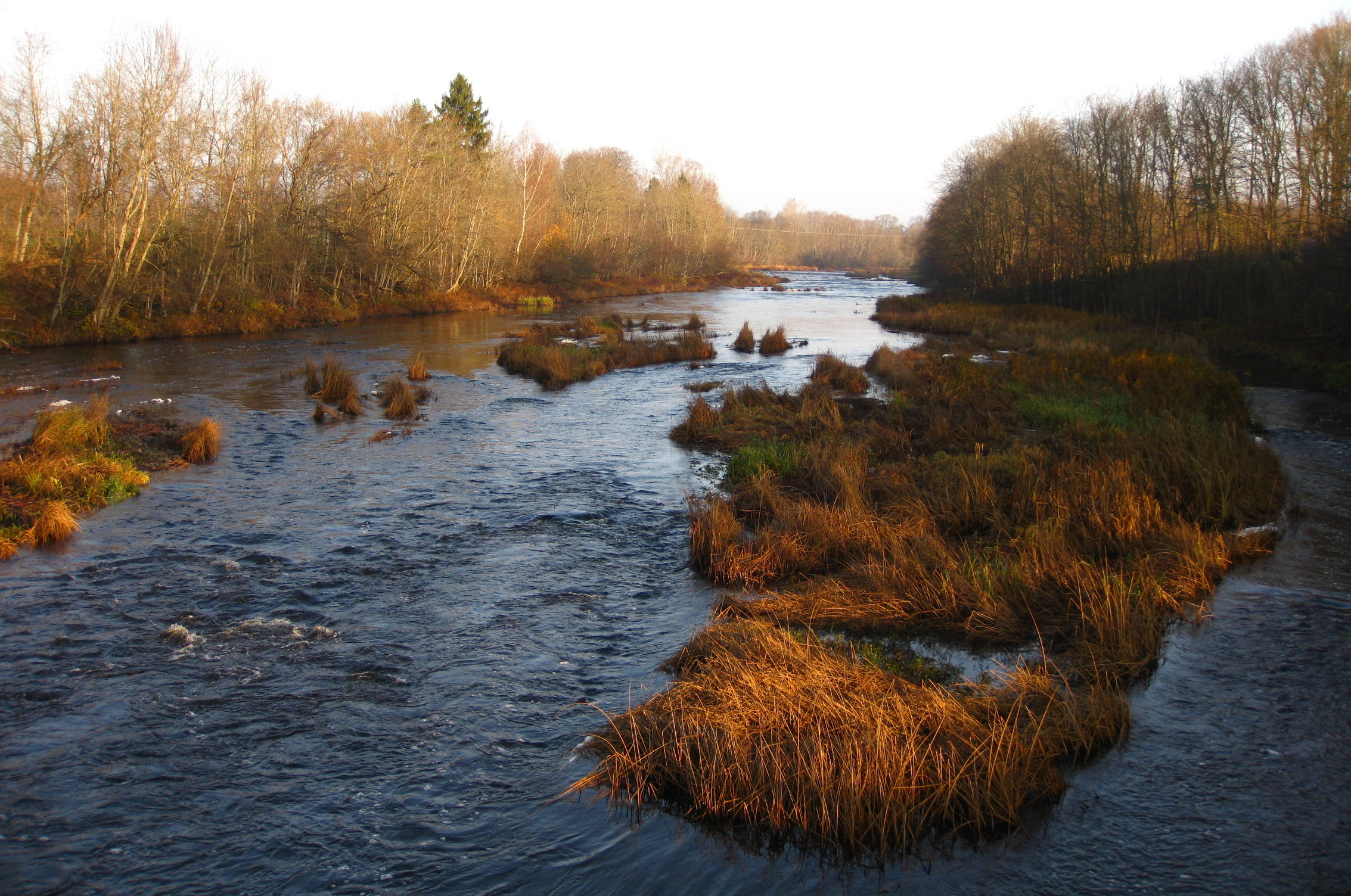
Pärnu River in Jõesuu.

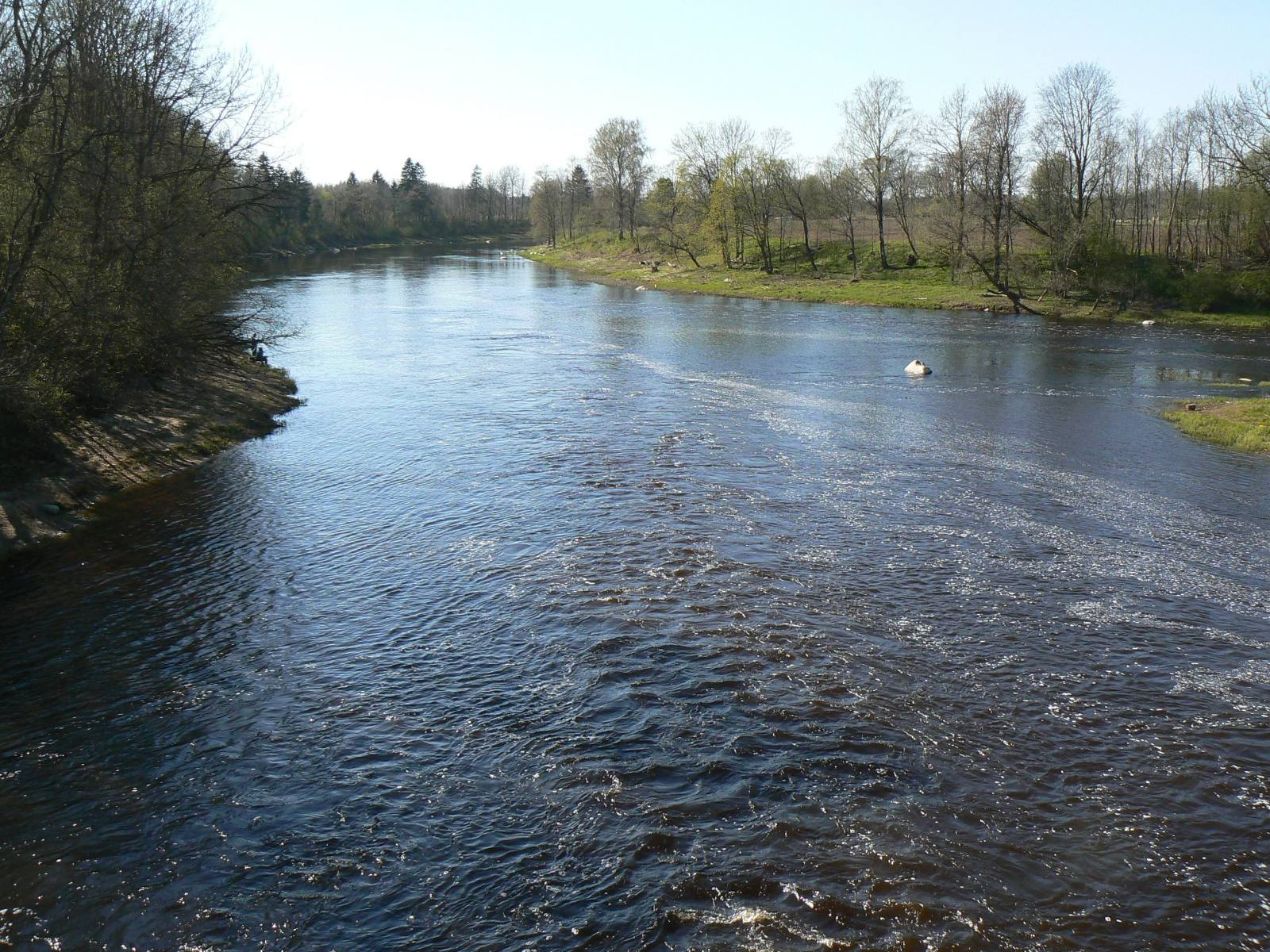
Mouth of Navesti into Pärnu River.
