= Võrevere =

Village in Estonia

Coordinates: 58°46′N 25°51′E

- Village
- Interactive map of Võrevere
- Country: Estonia
- County: Järva County
- Parish: Järva Parish
- Time zone: UTC+2 (EET)
  - Summer (DST): UTC+3 (EEST)

Võrevere is a village in Järva Parish, Järva County in central Estonia.

The estimated terrain elevation above sea level is 72 metres. Variant forms of spelling for Võrevere or in other languages: Võrevere Asundus, Vyrevere, Võrevere, Vorevere, Vorevere Asundus, Vyrevere, Võrevere, Võrevere Asundus.
