= Halliste (river) =

River in Estonia

Coordinates: 58°30′27.75″N 25°2′39.95″E

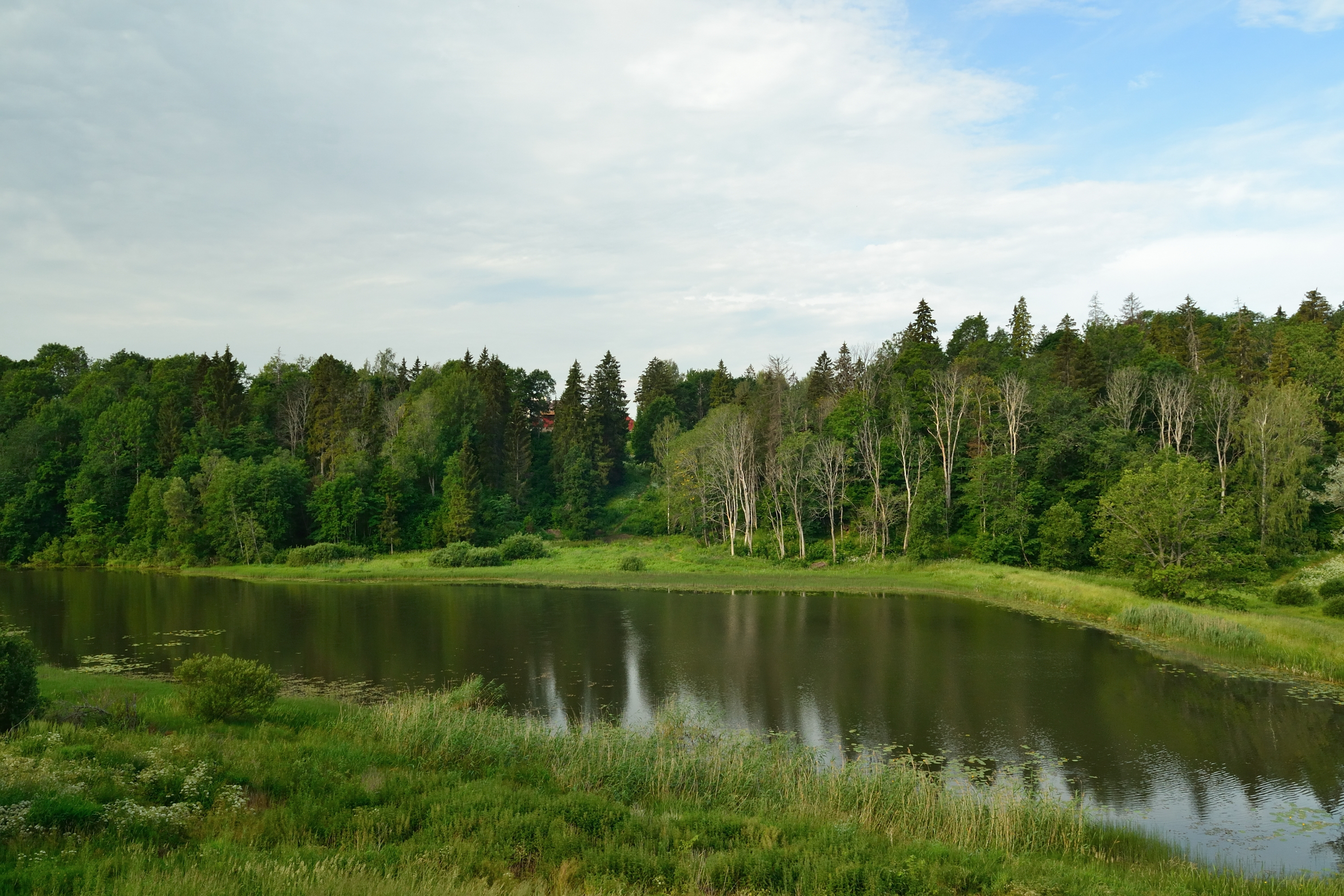

Location
- Country: Estonia

Physical characteristics
- Source
  - location: Sakala Uplands
  - elevation: 66 m (217 ft)
- Mouth
  - location: Navesti
- Length: 86 km (53 mi)
- Basin size: 1,900 km^{2} (730 sq mi)
- Discharge
  - average: 17.3 m^{3}/s (610 cu ft/s)

The Halliste is an 86 km (53 mi)-long river in Viljandi County, Estonia, and it is a left tributary of the Navesti River. Its source is on the Sakala Uplands. The basin area of Halliste is 1,900 km^{2}, and it has an average discharge of 17.3 m³/s.
