= Ene Mihkelson =

Estonian writer (1944–2017)

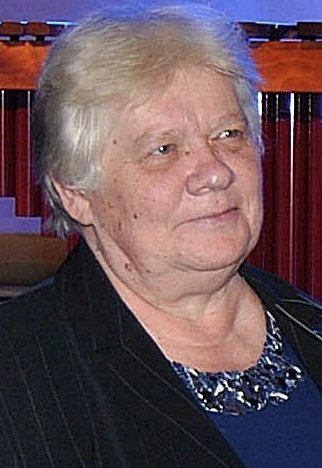
- Born: Imavere Parish, Viljandi County, then part of Estonian SSR, Soviet Union
- Died: September 20, 2017 (aged 72); Tartu, Estonia
- Education: University of Tartu
- Occupations: Poet, novelist, literary critic, researcher
- Writing career
- Period: 1967–2017
- Genres: Poetry, prose, essays
- Notable works: Ahasveeruse uni (2001); Katkuhaud (2007); Torn (2010)
- Notable awards: Herder Prize (2006); Baltic Assembly Prize for Literature (2010)

Ene Mihkelson (21 October 1944 – 20 September 2017) was an Estonian novelist and poet. Her work frequently examined national identity, historical memory, and twentieth-century Estonian history. She was a recipient of the Herder Prize and the Baltic Assembly Prize for Literature.

== Biography ==
=== Early life and education ===
Mihkelson was born in Imavere Parish, Viljandi County. Her mother, Evi Mihkelson, and her father, Heinrich-Rudolph "Heino" Mihkelson, were members of the Forest Brothers, people who opposed the Soviet occupation of Estonia and fled to the woods. Her parents spent long periods in hiding during her childhood. Her father died in combat in 1953.

She attended school in Rägavere from 1952 to 1953, in Karitsa from 1953 to 1959, and completed her secondary education at the Rakvere Boarding School in 1963. She studied literature at the University of Tartu), graduating in 1968.

=== Career ===
Following her graduation, she worked as a teacher. Mihkelson taught at the Võnnu Secondary School from 1968 to 1969. Between 1969 and 1979, she was employed as a researcher at the Estonian Literary Museum. She also worked as a freelance writer.

Mihkelson published her first book in 1967, although her debut poetry collection was published in 1978. She went on to publish thirteen volumes of poetry. She attributes some of her difficulties in her publishing career to her parents' political views, as they opposed the Soviet forces in Estonia. After the breakup of the Soviet Union, Mihkelson published ten poetry anthologies. Mihkelson also published four novels, a selection of critical essays (Kirjanduse seletusi, or Explanations of Literature) and a collection of short stories (Surma sünnipäev, or The Birthday of Death). In 2001 she published the novel Ahasveeruse uni. In 2006, she was awarded the Herder Prize and in 2010, the Baltic Assembly Prize for Literature.

Her prose publications include collections of short stories, a volume of critical essays, and four novels. Her 2001 novel Ahasveeruse uni (The Dream of Ahasuerus) deals with themes of historical memory and identity under totalitarian systems. Her later novel, Katkuhaud (The Plague Grave), was published in 2007.

Mihkelson's works frequently include allusions to her childhood, spent in hiding, Estonian mythology, and Estonian history. Her verse generally avoids conventional rhythm, meter, and rhyme, and instead uses inversions. It is known for its intensity, allegorical content and metaphysical topics.

== Recognition and legacy ==
Mihkelson died in 2017. In a 2006 survey of Estonian literary scholars, critics, and authors, Mihkelson's Ahasveeruse uni was voted the best Estonian novel published since the restoration of independence.

The Ene Mihkelson Society was founded in Tartu on 12 May 2018 to preserve and study her legacy. The society partners with the Tartu Cultural Endowment to manage a research fund that awards stipends and the Ene Mihkelson Cultural Thinker Award.

=== Awards ===
- 1994: Annual Prize of the Estonian Cultural Endowment for Literature (for Hüüdja hääl)
- 1994: Juhan Liiv Poetry Award (for the poem Eesti elu...)
- 1999: Juhan Liiv Poetry Award (for the poem Jah ikka veel...)
- 2001: Grand Prix of the Estonian Cultural Endowment for Literature (for Ahasveeruse uni)
- 2002: Fourth Class of the Order of the White Star
- 2003: "Ela ja sära" Fellowship
- 2006: Herder Prize
- 2007: Annual Prize of the Estonian Cultural Endowment for Literature (for Katkuhaud)
- 2008: A. H. Tammsaare Memorial Literature Prize (for Katkuhaud)
- 2010: Baltic Assembly Prize for Literature (for Torn)
- 2010: Tartu Cultural Bearer Award
- 2011: Gustav Suits Poetry Prize (for Torn)
- 2013: Honorary Citizen of Tartu and recipient of the Tartu Grand Star
- 2015: Cultural Prize of the Republic of Estonia for Lifetime Achievement
- 2016: Special Stipend of the Estonian National Culture Foundation

== Works ==
=== Poetry collections ===
- Selle talve laused (1978)
- Ring ja nelinurk (1979)
- Algolekud (1980)
- Tuhased tiivad (1982)
- Igiliikuja (1985)
- Tulek on su saatus (1987)
- Elujoonis (1989)
- Võimalus õunast loobuda (1990)
- Hüüdja hääl. Luuletusi 1988–1991 (1993)
- Pidevus neelab üht nuga (1997)
- Kaalud ei kõnele: valitud luuletusi 1967–97 (2000)
- Uroboros (2004)
- Torn (2010)

=== Prose and essays ===
- Matsi põhi (1983) – includes the novellas Matsi põhi and Kuju keset väljakut
- Korter (1985)
- Kirjanduse seletusi. Artikleid ja retsensioone 1973–1983 (1986)
- Nime vaev (1994)
- Surma sünnipäev. Novelle ja laaste (1996)
- Ahasveeruse uni (2001)
- Katkuhaud (2007)
