= Hermani =

Village in Estonia

- Village
- Location within Estonia
- Coordinates: 58°48′31″N 25°45′58″E
- Country: Estonia
- County: Järva County
- Parish: Järva Parish
- Time zone: UTC+2 (EET)
  - Summer (DST): UTC+3 (EEST)

Hermani (German: Hermannshof) is a village in Järva Parish, Järva County in central Estonia.

It was established on 7 September 2015 established by detaching the land from Käsukonna village.
