= Eistvere =

Village in Estonia

Coordinates: 58°41′N 25°44′E

- Village
- Interactive map of Eistvere
- Country: Estonia
- County: Järva County
- Parish: Järva Parish
- Time zone: UTC+2 (EET)
  - Summer (DST): UTC+3 (EEST)

Eistvere (German: Eigstfer) is a village in Järva Parish, Järva County in central Estonia.

== Notable people ==
- Hermynia Zur Mühlen (1883–1951), Austrian writer and translator
- Viktor von zur Mühlen (1879–1950), Baltic German military officer and politician
