= Imavere, Järva County =

Village in Estonia

Imavere
- Village
- Location within Estonia
- Coordinates: 58°43′57″N 25°46′2″E
- Country: Estonia
- County: Järva County
- Parish: Järva Parish

Population (2011)
  - Total: 447
- Time zone: UTC+2 (EET)
  - Summer (DST): UTC+3 (EEST)

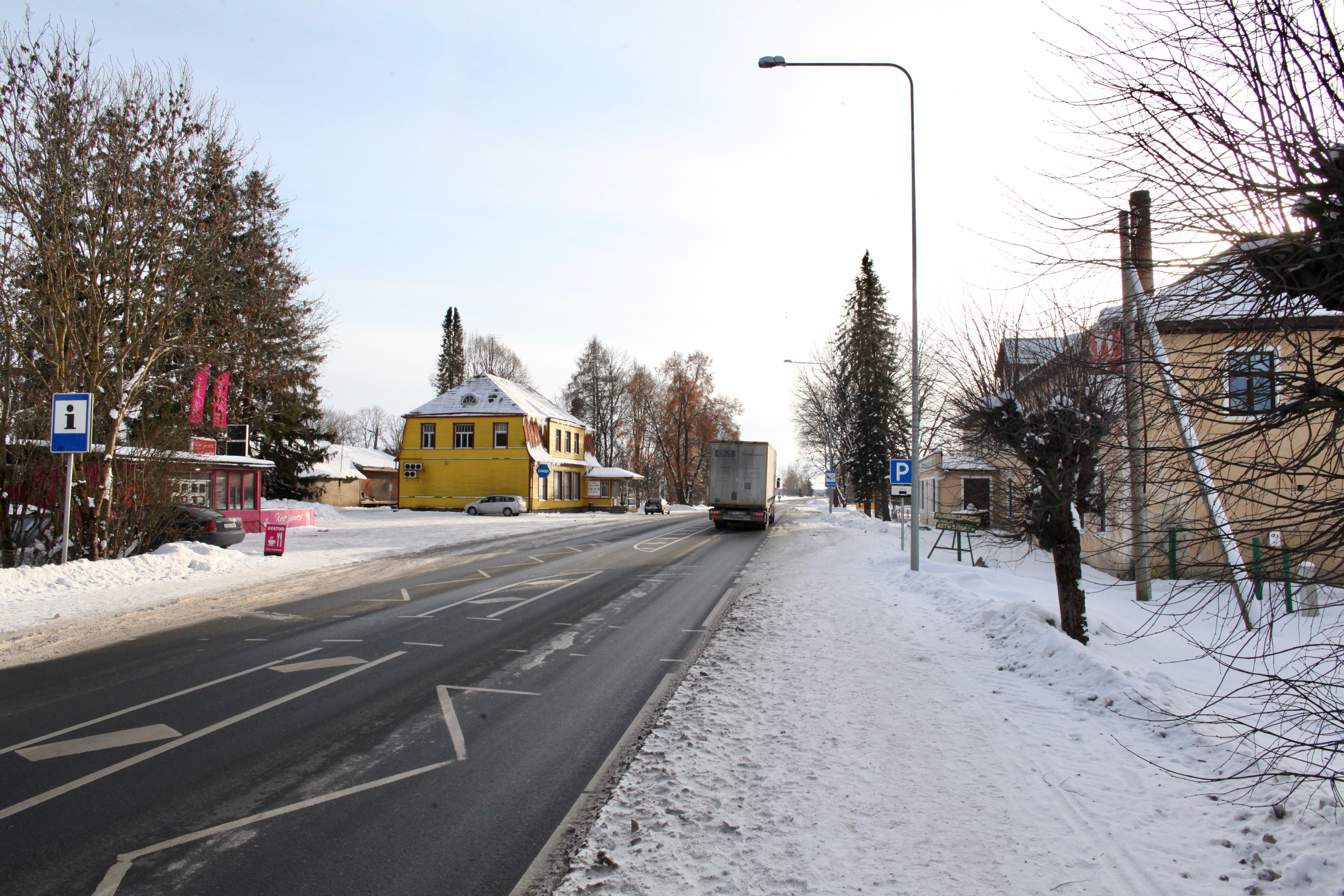
Winter in Imavere

Imavere (German: Immafer) is a village in Järva County in central Estonia. It was the administrative center of Imavere Parish.
