= Puiatu, Järva Parish =

Village in Estonia

Coordinates: 58°43′01″N 25°46′53″E

Puiatu
- Village
- Interactive map of Puiatu
- Country: Estonia
- County: Järva County
- Parish: Järva Parish
- Time zone: UTC+2 (EET)
  - Summer (DST): UTC+3 (EEST)

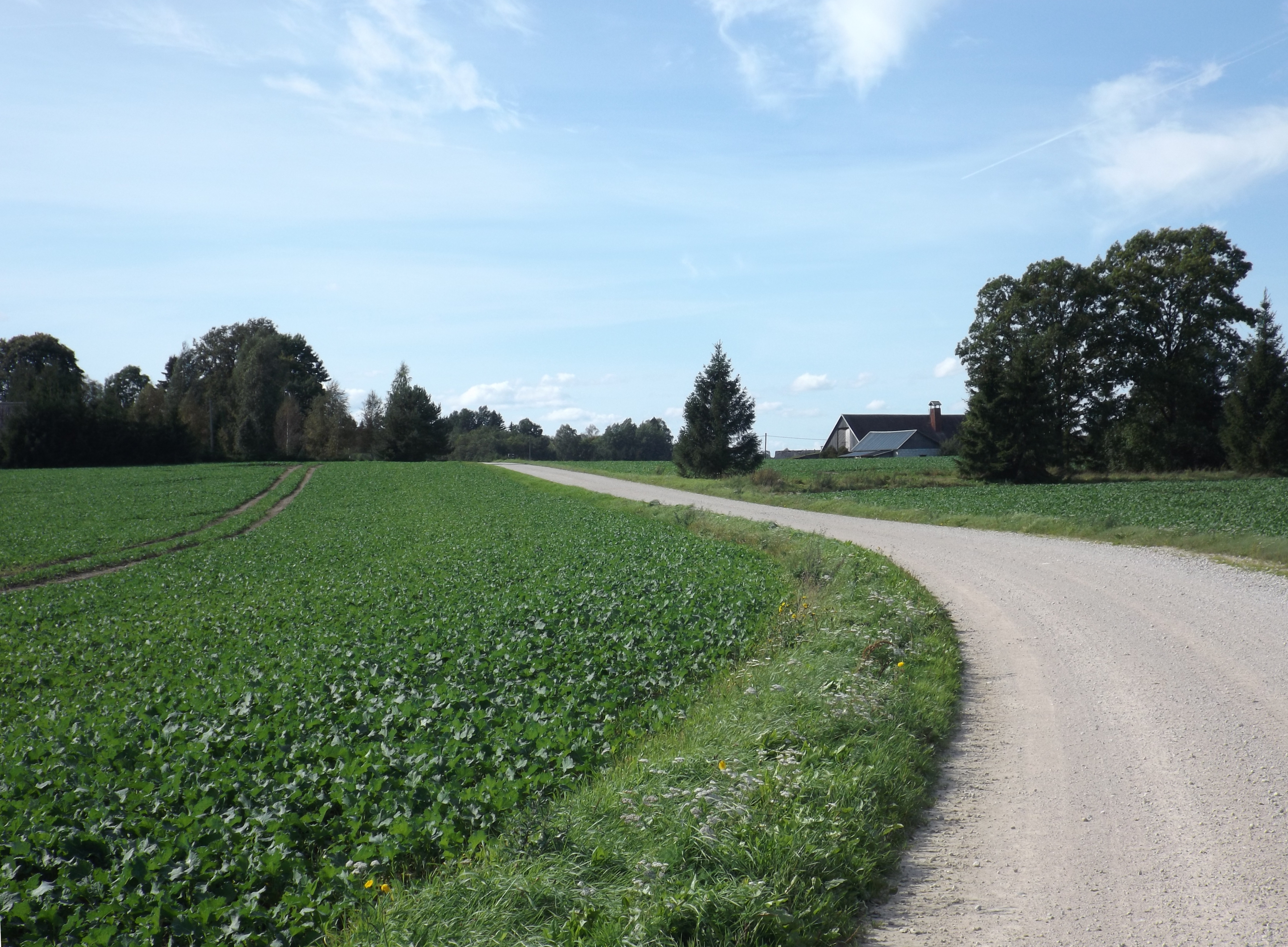
Kooli Road in Puiatu village

Puiatu is a village in Järva Parish, Järva County in central Estonia.
