= Papiorg Landscape Conservation Area =

Protected area in Estonia

- Location within Estonia
- Location: Estonia
- Coordinates: 58°33′35″N 25°33′20″E
- Area: 4 ha (9.9 acres)
- Established: 1964 (2009)

Papiorg Landscape Conservation Area (Estonian: Papioru maastikukaitseala) is a nature park in Viljandi County, Estonia.

The area of the nature park is 4 ha.

The protected area was founded in 1964 to protect steep-sloped river valley (Estonian: sügav järsunõlvaline sälkorg).
