= Käsukonna =

Village in Estonia

Coordinates: 58°48′N 25°45′E

- Village
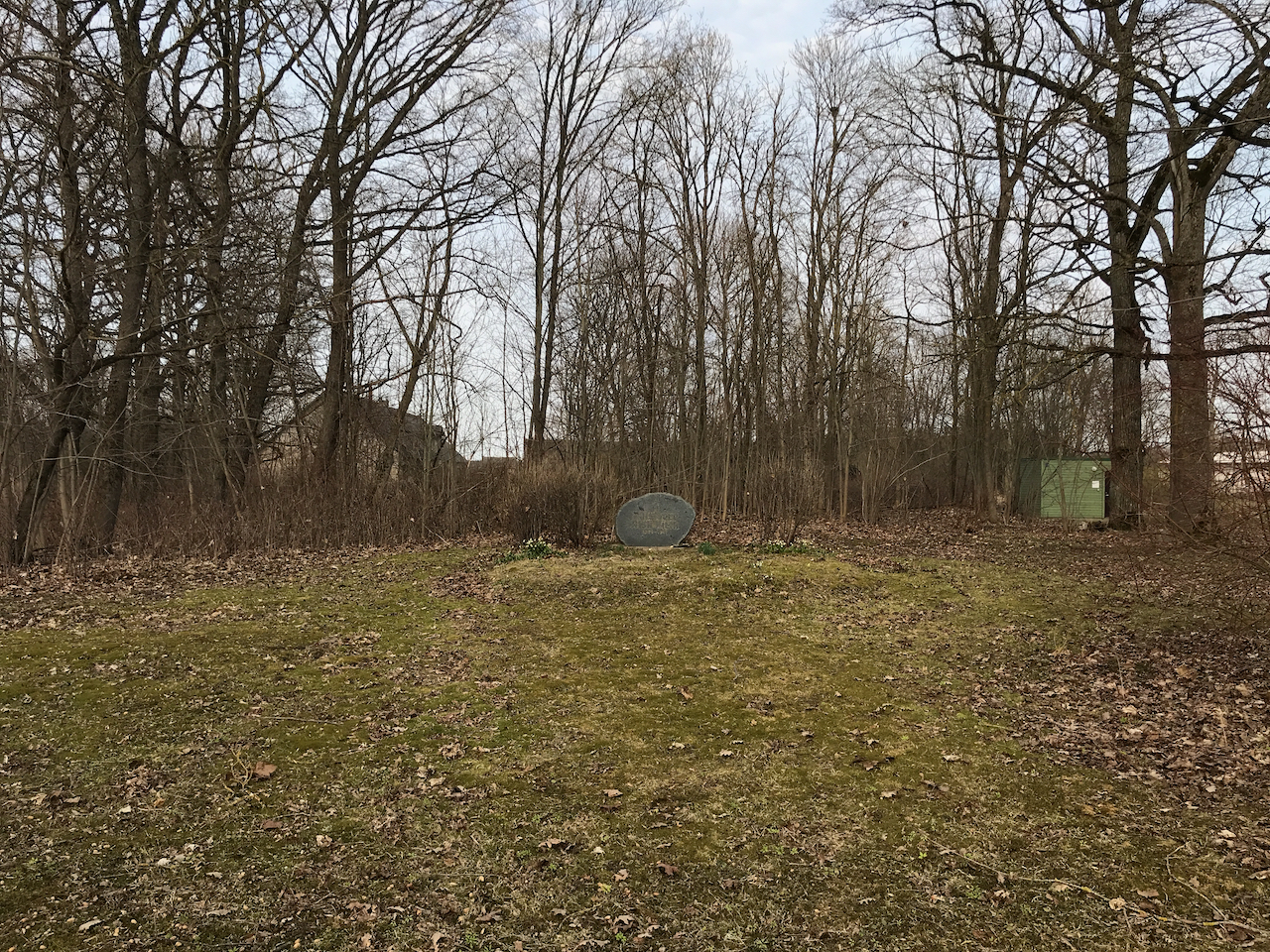
- Käsukonna
- Interactive map of Käsukonna
- Country: Estonia
- County: Järva County
- Parish: Järva Parish
- Time zone: UTC+2 (EET)
  - Summer (DST): UTC+3 (EEST)

Käsukonna is a village in Järva Parish, Järva County in central Estonia.

On 7 September 2015, Hermani village was established by detaching the land from Käsukonna village.
