= Ahasveeruse uni =

2001 novel by Ene Mihkelson

Ahasveeruse uni is a 2001 novel by Estonian author Ene Mihkelson. The protagonist of the novel is a woman born in 1944, who during independence in the 1990s, looks through the Soviet era archives to find information about the fate of her parents after the Second World War, in which they died in mysterious circumstances. The novel was selected by literary scholars, editors, writers and academics in a 2006 survey conducted to find the great novels published in Estonia in the post-occupation period.
