= Pilistvere =

Village in Estonia

- Village
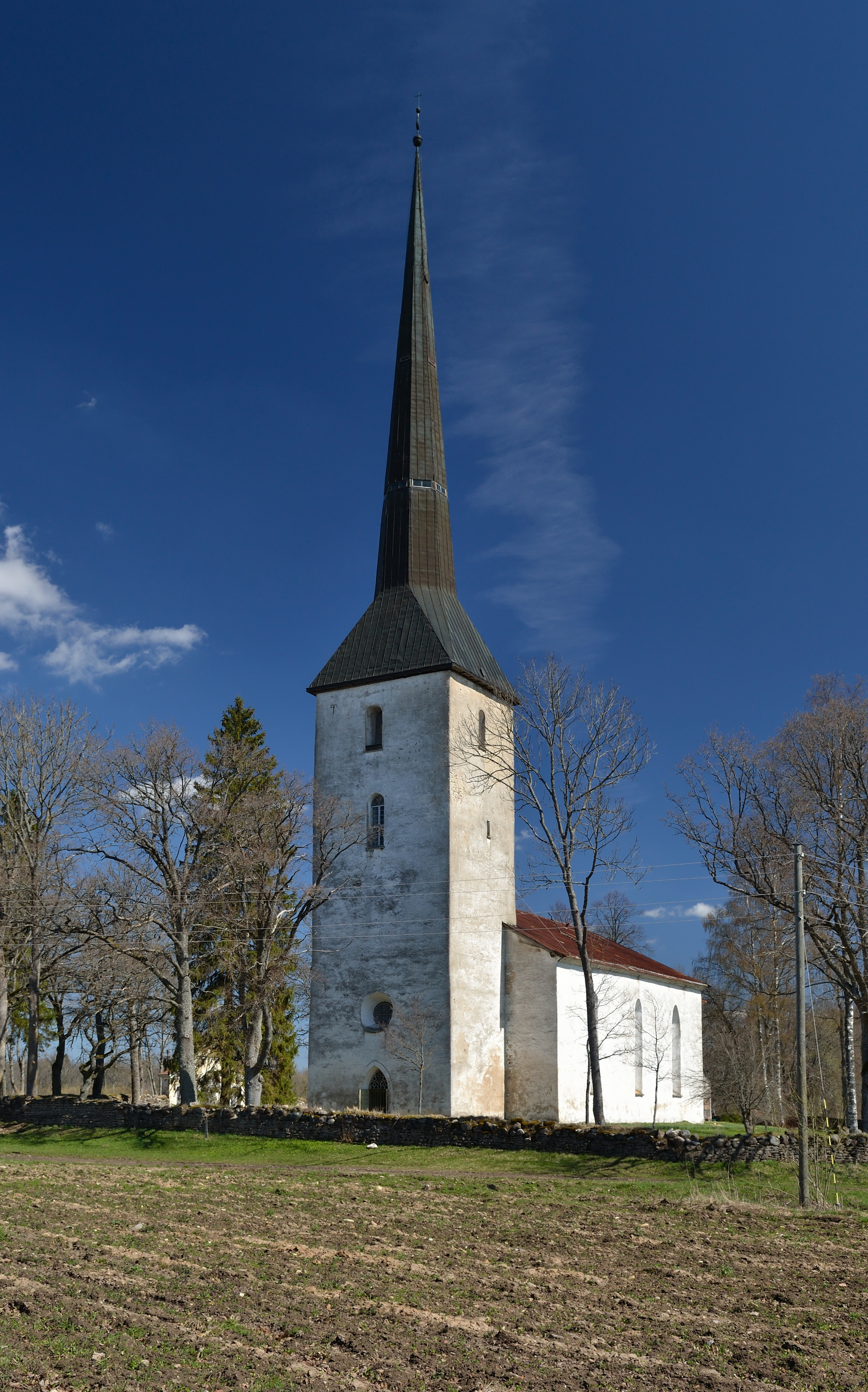
- Pilistvere church

- Location in Estonia
- Coordinates: 58°39′46″N 25°44′56″E
- Country: Estonia
- County: Viljandi County
- Municipality: Põhja-Sakala Parish

Population (2011 census)
  - Total: 90

Pilistvere (German: Pillistfer) is a village in Põhja-Sakala Parish, Viljandi County, in central Estonia. It is located about 11 km (7 mi) east of the town of Võhma and about 13 km (8 mi) west of the town of Põltsamaa. Pilistvere lies on the left bank of the Navesti River. As of the 2011 census, the settlement's population was 90.

== Pilistvere Church ==
The church, originally dedicated to St. Andrew, dates from the end of the 13th century. It is a hall church with a nave and two aisles. The church has a square choir and a western tower. Of the original medieval furnishings, little remains as the church has been damaged by fire and war on several occasions. The baroque pulpit (1686) is the most noteworthy interior furnishing. The tower has the tallest spire of any rural church in Estonia.

== Gallery ==
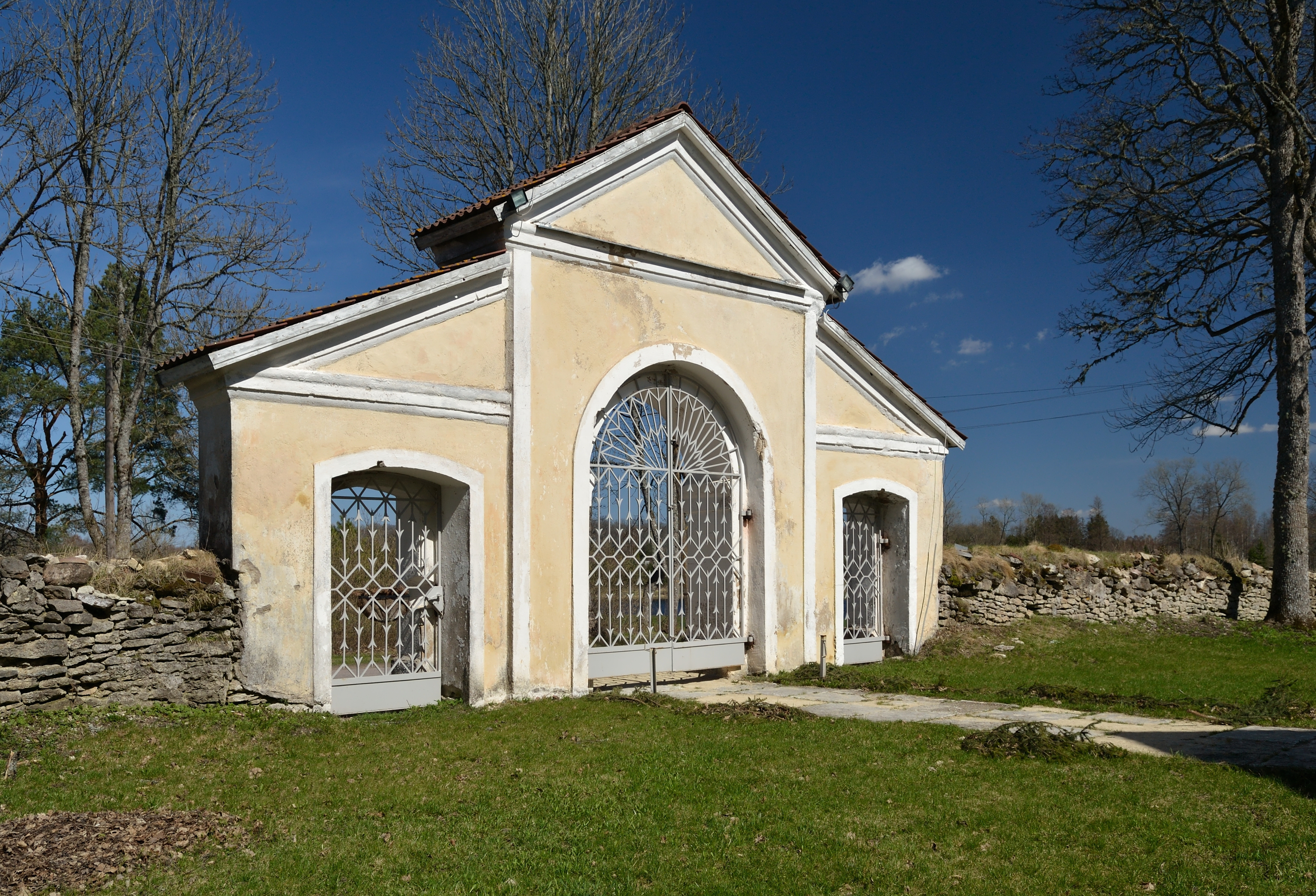
Pilistvere churchyard gate with walls

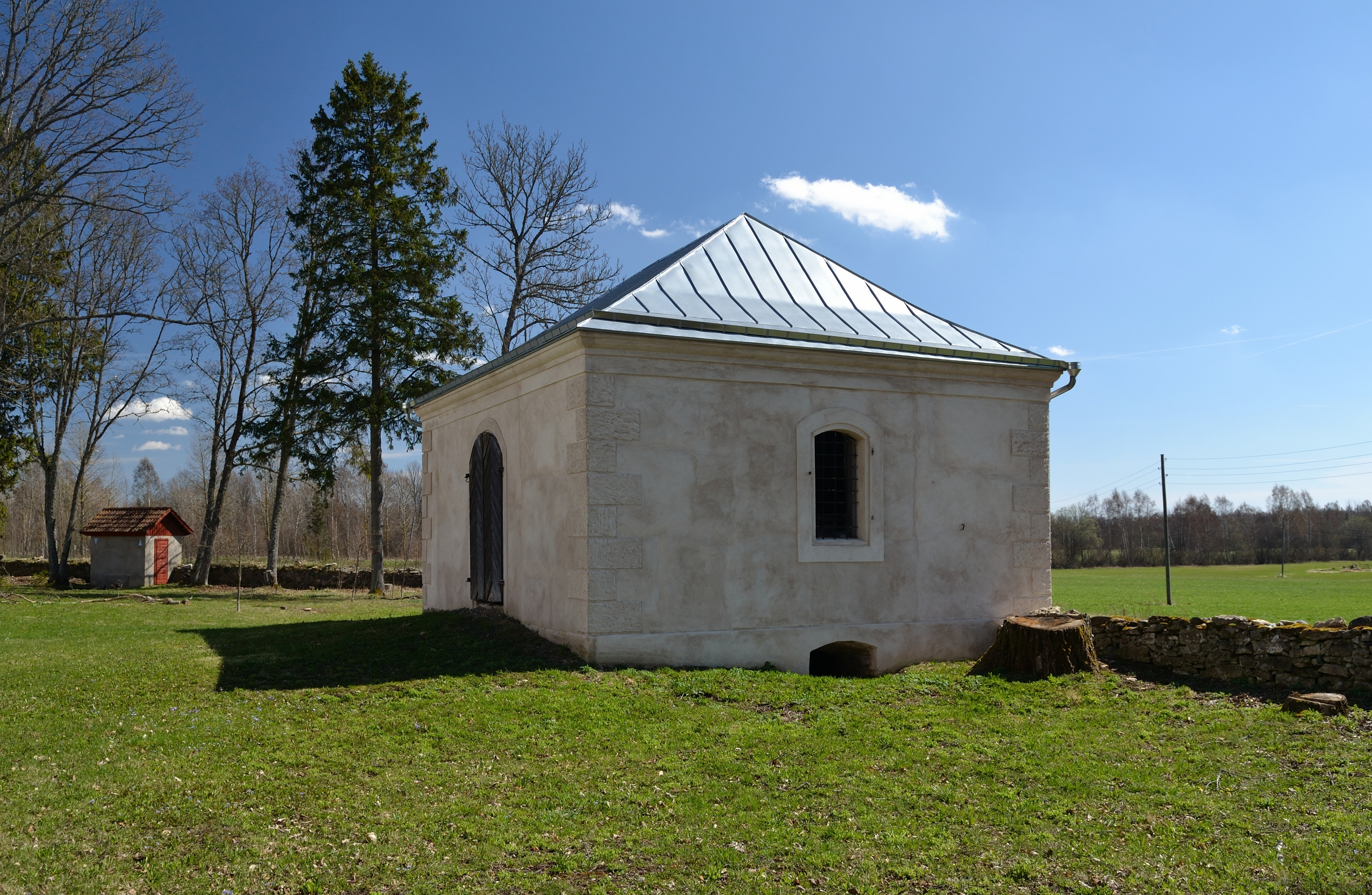
Pilistvere churchyard chapel

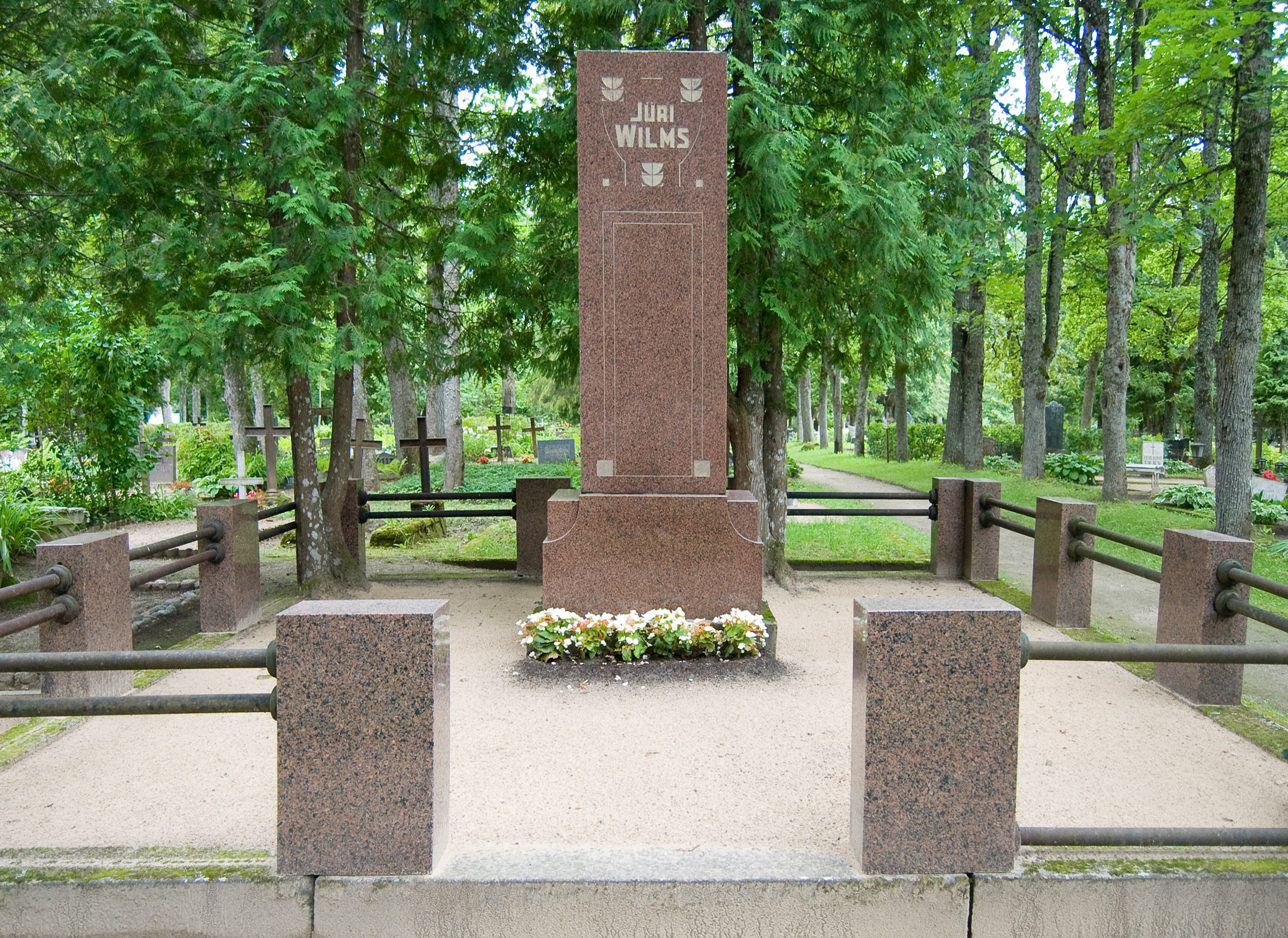
Grave of politician Jüri Vilms at Pilistvere cemetery

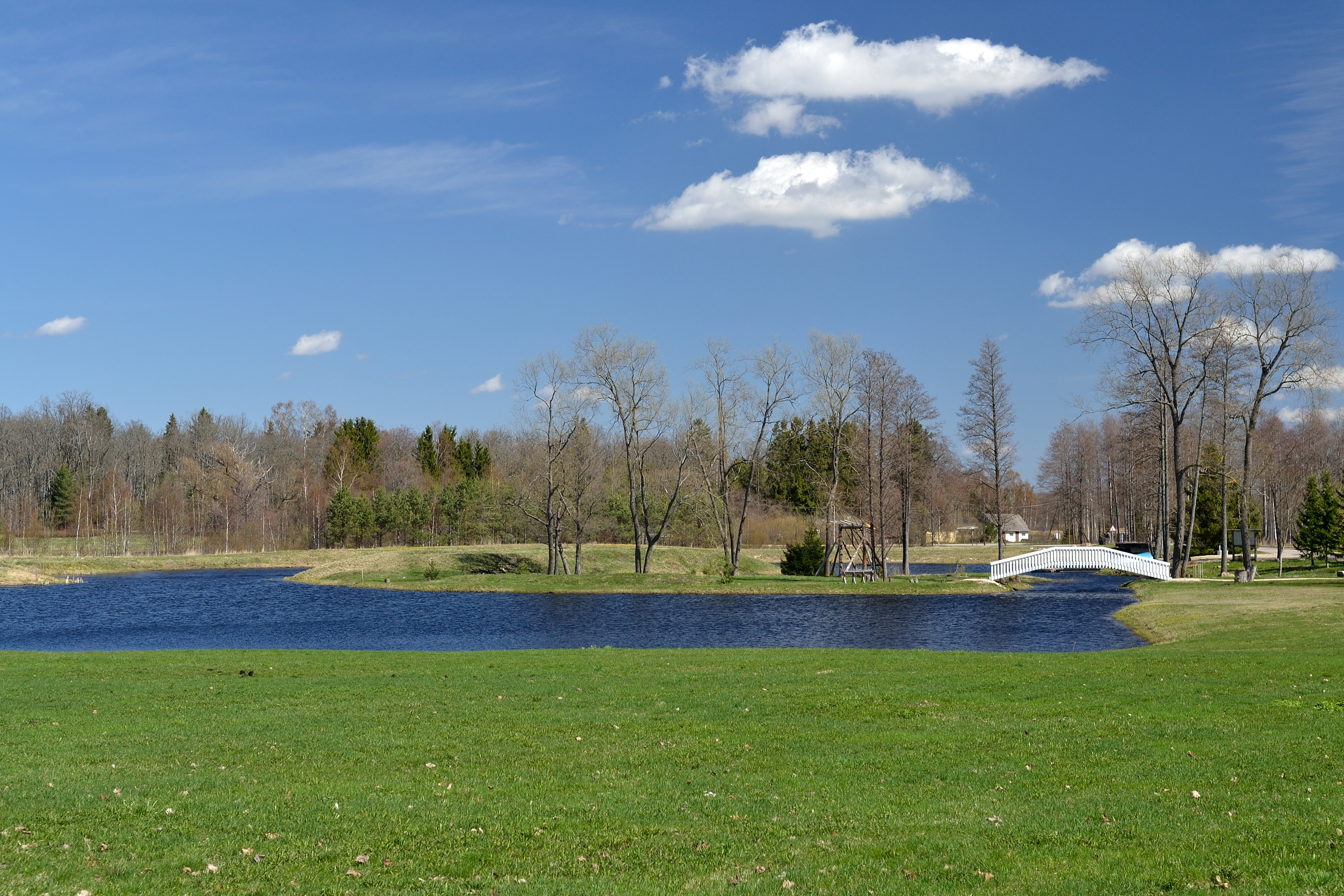
Pilistvere impounded lake on the Navesti River
