= Vaiga =

Ancient county of Estonia

- county of Ancient Estonia
- 1224
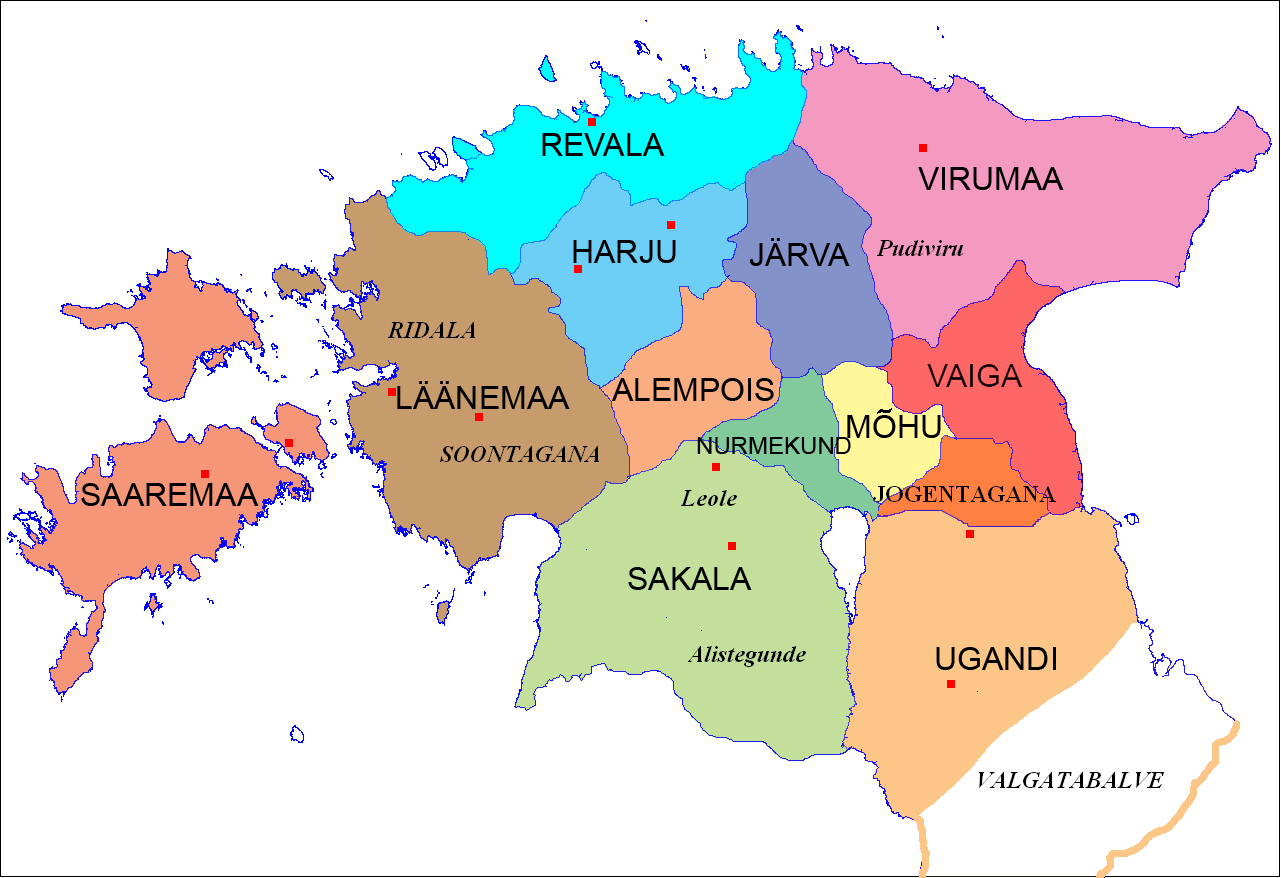
- Ancient Estonian counties
- Area
  - Coordinates: 58°40′N 27°00′E
Succeeded by
Monastic state of the Teutonic Knights

Vaiga was a small landlocked ancient Estonian county in the eastern part of the territory of Estonia. It territory now belongs to the eastern part of Jõgeva County.

== See also ==
- Livonian Crusade
