= Mõhu =

Ancient county of Estonia

- county of Ancient Estonia
- 9th Century–1224
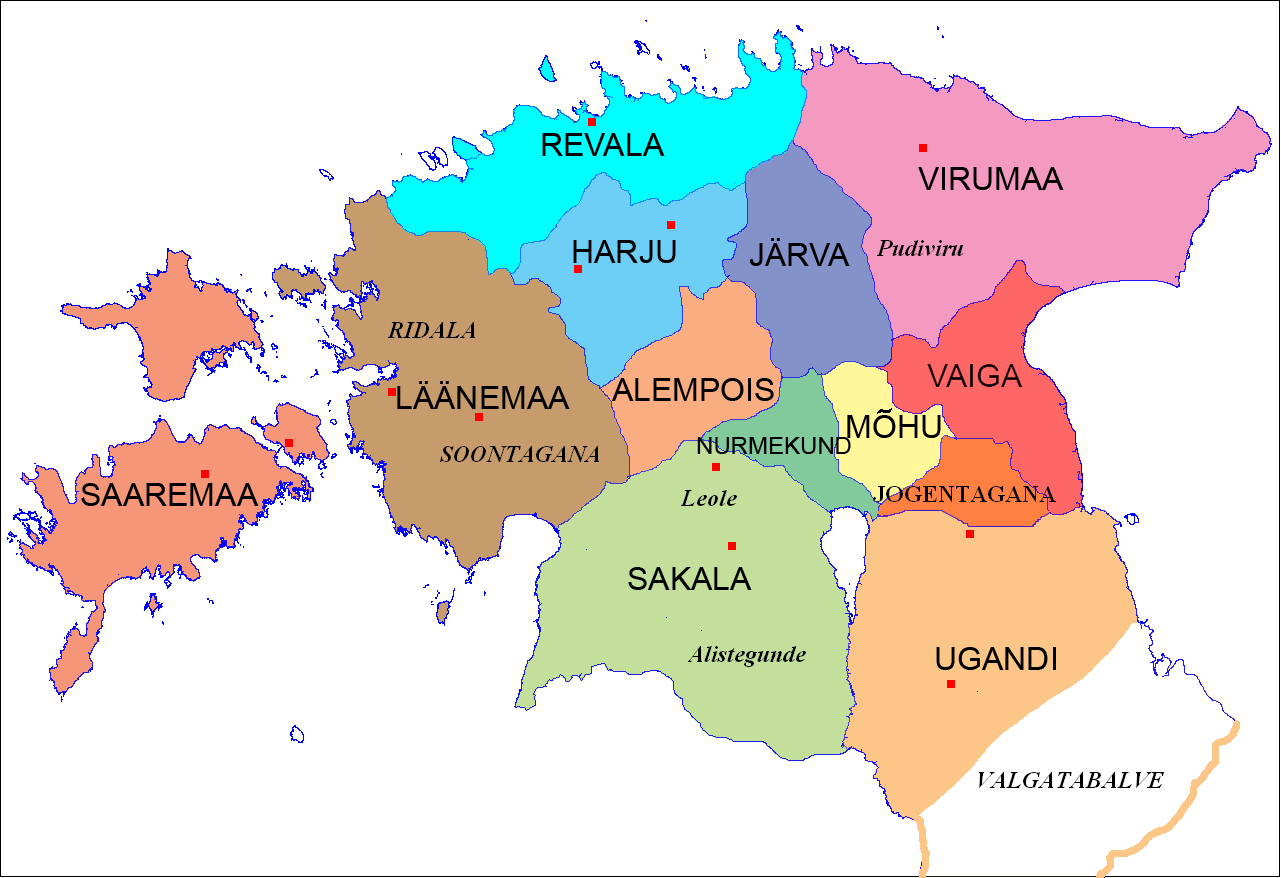
- Ancient Estonian counties
- Area
  - Coordinates: 58°40′N 26°00′E
- History
  - Established: 9th Century
  - Livonian Crusade: 1224
Succeeded by
Monastic state of the Teutonic Knights

Mõhu was a small landlocked ancient Estonian county in the central part of the territory of Estonia. It was later conquered by the Teutonic Order during the Estonian Crusade.

== See also ==
- Livonian Crusade
