= Counties of Estonia =

First-level administrative subdivisions of Estonia

Counties of Estonia (after the 2017 Administrative Reform)

The counties of Estonia (maakond) are the state administrative subdivisions of Estonia. Estonian territory is composed of 15 counties, including 13 on the mainland and 2 on islands. County governments (maavalitsus) were abolished at the end of 2017, with their duties split between state authorities and local governments, and nowadays counties have no noteworthy independent competences. Counties are composed of municipalities of two types: urban municipalities or towns (linn), and rural municipalities or parishes (vald), which are by law required to cooperate in development of their county.

== List ==
As of 2023, the sum total of the figures in the table below is 42,644 km^{2}, of which the land area is 42,388 km^{2}, so that 256 km^{2} of water is included in the figures.

List of counties of Estonia
	Coat of arms	County	Capital	Area (km^{2})	Population	Pop. density (per km^{2})	GDP (mil. €)	GDP per capita (€)
1		Harju County	Tallinn	4,327	638,076	147.46	21,680	34,615
2		Hiiu County	Kärdla	1,023	8,474	8.21	146	17,225
3		Ida-Viru County	Jõhvi	2,972	133,358	44.87	2,631	19,778
4		Jõgeva County	Jõgeva	2,545	27,739	10.90	466	16,768
5		Järva County	Paide	2,674	30,072	11.25	610	20,405
6		Lääne County	Haapsalu	1,816	20,688	11.40	320	15,658
7		Lääne-Viru County	Rakvere	3,696	59,608	16.13	1,074	18,150
8		Põlva County	Põlva	2,165	24,036	11.10	347	14,450
9		Pärnu County	Pärnu	5,419	87,418	16.13	1,587	18,334
10		Rapla County	Rapla	2,765	34,038	12.31	540	15,985
11		Saare County	Kuressaare	2,938	31,919	10.86	518	16,380
12		Tartu County	Tartu	2,993	162,390	54.26	4,186	26,151
13		Valga County	Valga	1,917	28,114	14.67	425	15,260
14		Viljandi County	Viljandi	3,422	45,637	13.37	896	19,692
15		Võru County	Võru	2,305	34,317	14.89	584	17,041

== History ==
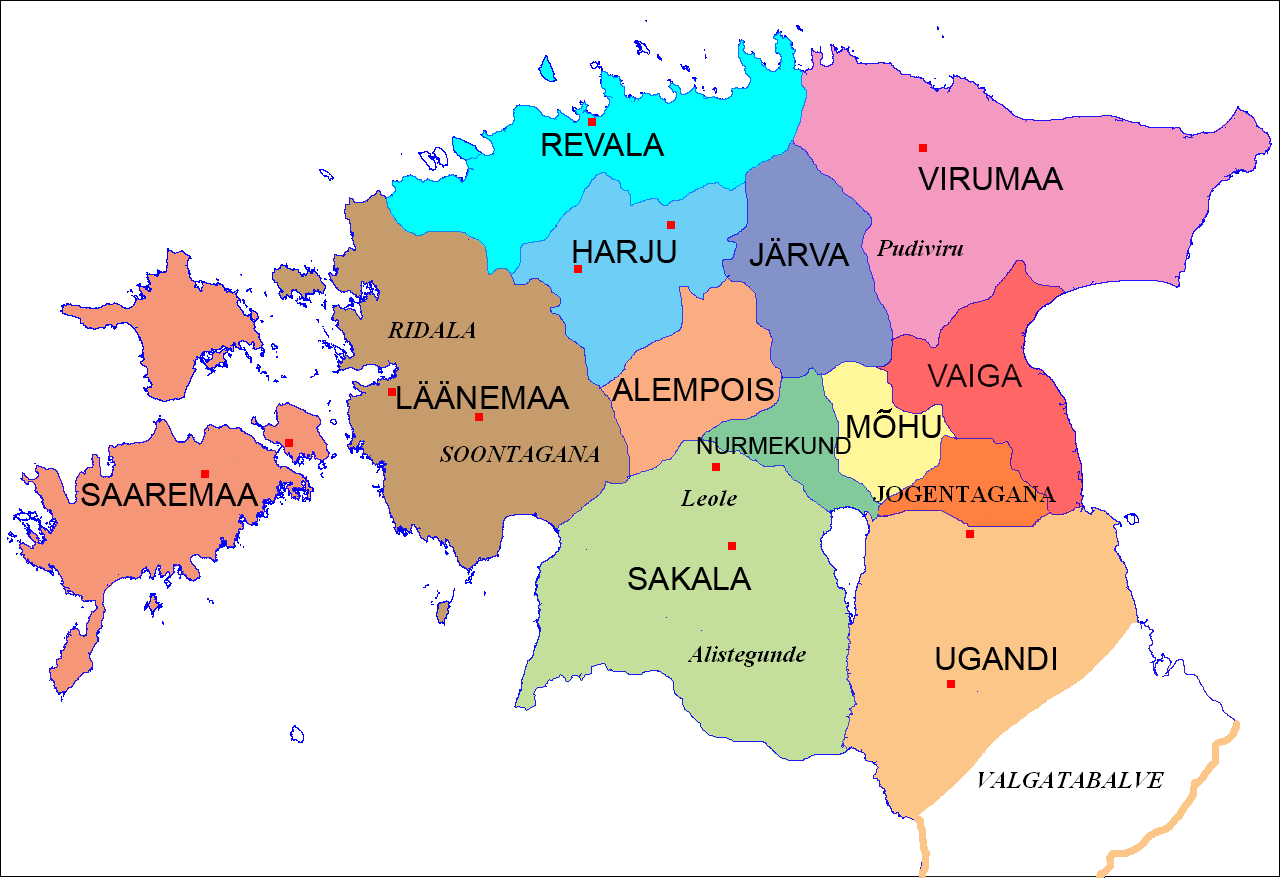
Pre-Christian independent Estonian counties (maakond), c. 1200

In the first centuries AD, political and administrative subdivisions began to emerge in Estonia. Two larger subdivisions appeared: the parish (kihelkond) and the county (maakond). The parish consisted of several villages. Nearly all parishes had at least one fortress. The defence of the local area was directed by the highest official, the parish elder. The county was composed of several parishes, also headed by an elder. By the 13th century the following major counties had developed in Estonia: Saaremaa (Osilia), Läänemaa (Rotalia or Maritima), Harjumaa (Harria), Rävala (Revalia), Virumaa (Vironia), Järvamaa (Jervia), Sakala (Saccala), and Ugandi (Ugaunia). Additionally there were several smaller elderships in central Estonia where danger of war was smaller – Vaiga, Mõhu, Nurmekund and Alempois. The exact number and borders of some elderships are disputed.

The first documented mentioning of Estonian political and administrative subdivisions comes from the Chronicle of Henry of Livonia, written in the 13th century during the Northern Crusades.

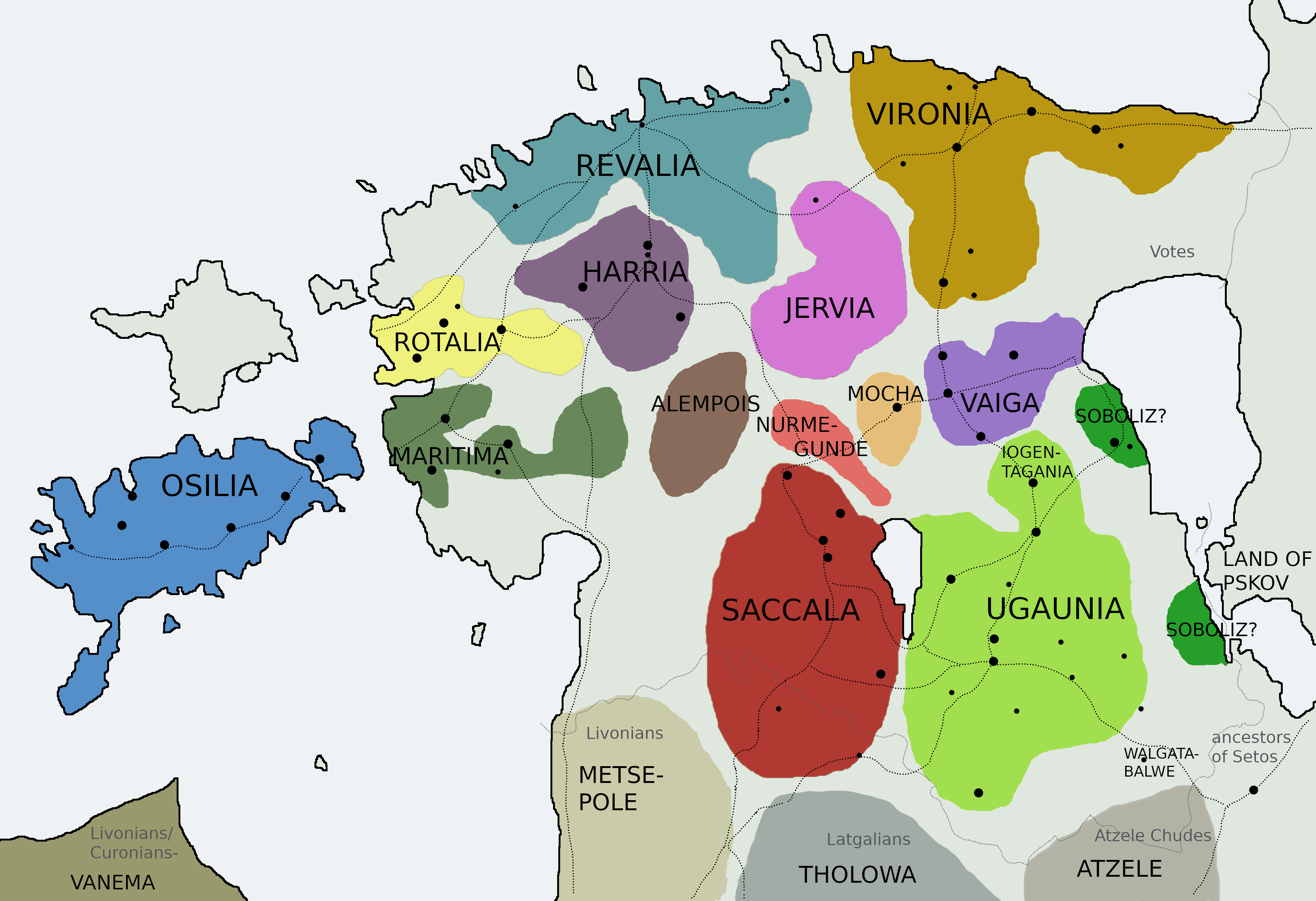
Another map of the ancient counties of Estonia in the twelfth century.

The autonomy of the pre-Christian Estonian counties and parishes ended during the Livonian Crusade, as by mid-13th century all Estonian lands were divided as a result of the Catholic conquest between the Kingdom of Denmark, and three subdivisions of the Holy Roman Empire: the State of the Teutonic Order, the Bishopric of Dorpat, and the Bishopric of Ösel-Wiek.

In the 1580s, after the Livonian war as Sweden had conquered northern Estonia, Harju, Järva, Lääne and Viru counties were officially formed there. Southern Estonia, which belonged to Poland 1582–1625, was divided into voivodships of Pärnu and Tartu; the island of Saaremaa belonged to Denmark until 1645. All these territories became counties as they became part of the Kingdom of Sweden.

This administrative system remained mostly unchanged when Estonia was ceded by Sweden, and became part of the Russian Empire as a result of the Great Northern War (1700-1721). In 1793, the new Võru County was formed in the south of Tartumaa, Viljandi County between Tartu and Pärnu counties, and Paldiski County in the west of Harjumaa. In 1796, the Paldiski County was joined with Harjumaa again. Until 1888 Võrumaa and Viljandimaa were not wholly independent from Tartumaa and Pärnumaa, respectively.

Several changes were made to the borders of counties after Estonia became independent in 1918; e.g. the formation of Valga County (from parts of Võru, Tartu and Viljandi counties) and Petseri County (area acquired from Russia with the 1920 Tartu peace treaty).

During the 1944-1991 Soviet occupation of Estonia, multiple changes were made in administrative boundaries. Petseri County was ceded to Russia in 1945. Hiiumaa was separated from Läänemaa in 1946, Jõgevamaa from Tartumaa in 1949, and Jõhvimaa (modern Ida-Virumaa) from Virumaa in 1949. Counties were completely dissolved in 1950 as the Estonian SSR was divided into raions (rajoon) and (until 1953) oblasts. Until the 1960s, the borders of raions often changed until 15 of them were left. Out of them, Põlva and Rapla raions became separate, whereas other raions roughly corresponded to the pre-1950 counties.

Counties were re-established on 1 January 1990 in the borders of the Soviet-era raions. Due to the numerous differences between the current and historical (pre-1940) layouts, the historical borders are still used in ethnology, better representing cultural and linguistic differences.

County governments were abolished at the end of 2017, with their duties split between state authorities and local governments. Nowadays counties have no noteworthy independent competences, but local governments are required by law to work together in developing their county.

== See also ==
- Flags of Estonian counties
- Coats of arms of Estonian Counties
- ISO 3166-2:EE
- Municipalities of Estonia
- Administrative reform in Estonia
