= Treaty of Königsberg (1390) =

1390 treaty between the Teutonic Knights and Samogitian nobles

The Treaty of Königsberg was signed in Königsberg (Królewiec) on May 26, 1390 during the Lithuanian Civil War (1389–1392) between Samogitian nobles and representatives of the Teutonic Knights. The 31-member or 30-member (Note: Zenonas Ivinskis and Jonas Puzinas interpreted that note "Eywild Eynuren bruder" refers to two persons: Eywild and some unnamed brother of Eynur. Rimvydas Petrauskas interpreted that it was one person.) delegation from seven Samogitian regions (Ariogala, Kaltinėnai, Knituva, Kražiai, Medingėnai, Raseiniai, and Viduklė) arrived to Königsberg around the pentecost. They promised their loyalty to "their king" Vytautas and guaranteed trade freedom for the Knights in Samogitia. The Knights gifted the nobles with food and clothes.

Vytautas the Great waged a civil against his cousin Jogaila, Grand Duke of Lithuania and King of Poland. In order to secure Teutonic support in the civil war, Vytautas signed the Treaty of Lyck and granted Samogitia up to the Nevėžis River to the Knights on January 19, 1390. Samogitia was important for the Knights as this territory physically separated them from uniting with the Livonian Order in the north. Support of Samogitians was crucial to Vytautas as it was the only guarantee that the Treaty of Lyck would be carried out. However, Vytautas betrayed the Knights when in 1392 he reconciled with his cousin Jogaila and signed the Ostrów Agreement. Samogitia was not ceded to the Knights until the Treaty of Salynas in 1398. The treaty and the 30 names of Samogitian nobles are important for the study of personal names in pagan Lithuania.

== List of Samogitian nobles ==
#	Reconstructed name	Recorded name	Where from	Notes
1	Asteika	Hosteike	Raseiniai	
2	Bimantas, Bymantas	Bimunt	Viduklė	
3	Daukša	Dawchs	Kaltinėnai	
4	Dirkštelis	Dirkstel	Medininkai	
5	Dramutis	Dramutte	Ariogala	In 1401, with his son witnessed the Union of Vilnius and Radom
6	Eikutis	Eycutte	Kražiai	In 1419, he was a court official in Medininkai
7	Eimantas	Eymund	Kaltinėnai	
8	Einorius, Einoras	Eynur	Kražiai	
9	Eivildas, Eiviltas	Eywild Eynuren bruder	Kražiai	In 1413, received Ciołek coat of arms according to the Union of Horodło
10	Erimas	Erim	Ariogala	
11	Gelvonas	Gelwan	Viduklė	
12	Getas, Gedas	Getez	Kražiai	
13	Gineitis	Gineth	Ariogala	In 1413, received Zaremba coat of arms according to the Union of Horodło; in 1433, served as elder of Kaunas
14	Jodeika, Joteikis	Jotheke	Ariogala	
15	Klausigaila	Clawssegail	Raseiniai	Active during the Samogitian uprising of 1409; testified to Benedict Makrai regarding the Samogitian border in 1413
16	Mazbutas	Maisebuth	Medininkai	
17	Pamplys	Pampli	Knituva	
18	Ragelis	Ragel	Kaltinėnai	
19	Ramontas, Ramavydas	Ramomt, Ramouit	Kražiai	
20	Rėkutis	Roeukutte	Medininkai	
21	Skutas	Skutez	Kaltinėnai	
22	Skvaibutis	Sqwaybuth	Kaltinėnai	
23	Sungaila, Surgaila	Sungail	Viduklė	Might be identical to Sungalo who testified in the Council of Constance in 1416 and was later killed by the Knights
24	Surtenis, Surtinis	Surthen	Viduklė	
25	Tyla, Tylenis	Tilen	Kaltinėnai	
26	Vidas, Vydas	Wide	Kražiai	
27	Vilaudis, Vyliaudas	Wilawde	Ariogala	
28	Zundys	Sunde	Ariogala	
29	Žaudys	Zawden	Raseiniai	
30	Žilpa	Zilpe	Knituva	
