= Treaty of Lyck =

1390 treaty between Lithuania and the Teutonic Knights

The Treaty of Lyck was a treaty between Vytautas the Great, future Grand Duke of Lithuania, and the Teutonic Knights, represented by Marquard von Salzbach, komtur Arnold von Bürglen, and Thomas, son of Lithuanian duke Survila. It was signed on 19 January 1390 in Lyck, State of the Teutonic Order, (now Ełk, Poland). Vytautas, in exchange for a military alliance against his cousin Jogaila during the Lithuanian Civil War (1389–1392), agreed to cede Samogitia up to the Nevėžis River and become the Order's vassal. In essence Vytautas confirmed the Treaty of Königsberg (1384) that he had signed with the Knights during the Lithuanian Civil War (1381–1384). Once betrayed, the Knights now asked for hostages as a guarantee of Vytautas' loyalty. The Order demanded as hostages his two brothers Sigismund and Tautvilas, wife Anna, daughter Sophia, sister Rymgajla, brother-in-law Ivan Olshanski, and a number of other nobles.

Vytautas initiated the negotiations when he failed to capture Vilnius, capital of the Grand Duchy of Lithuania. He sent Marquard von Salzbach and the Count of Rheineck, two knights held captive since 1384, to negotiate on his behalf. The treaty was signed in secret as not to alert Jogaila and his brother Skirgaila. The Knights managed to convince Skirgaila that they were ready to negotiate peace with him, and he even returned from Polotsk to Vilnius anticipating the Teutonic envoy.

The Treaty of Lyck was strengthened by the Treaty of Königsberg (1390), signed between the Knights and a Samogitian delegation, which promised its loyalty to the "Samogitian king" Vytautas. The Knights helped Vytautas to wage a war against Jogaila, but the cousins reconciled in 1392 and signed the Ostrów Agreement. The Knights were once again betrayed: Vytautas burned three of their castles and did not cede Samogitia. They continued to wage war until the Treaty of Salynas of 1398; territorial disputes over Samogitia dragged until the Treaty of Melno of 1422.
