= Marquard von Salzbach =

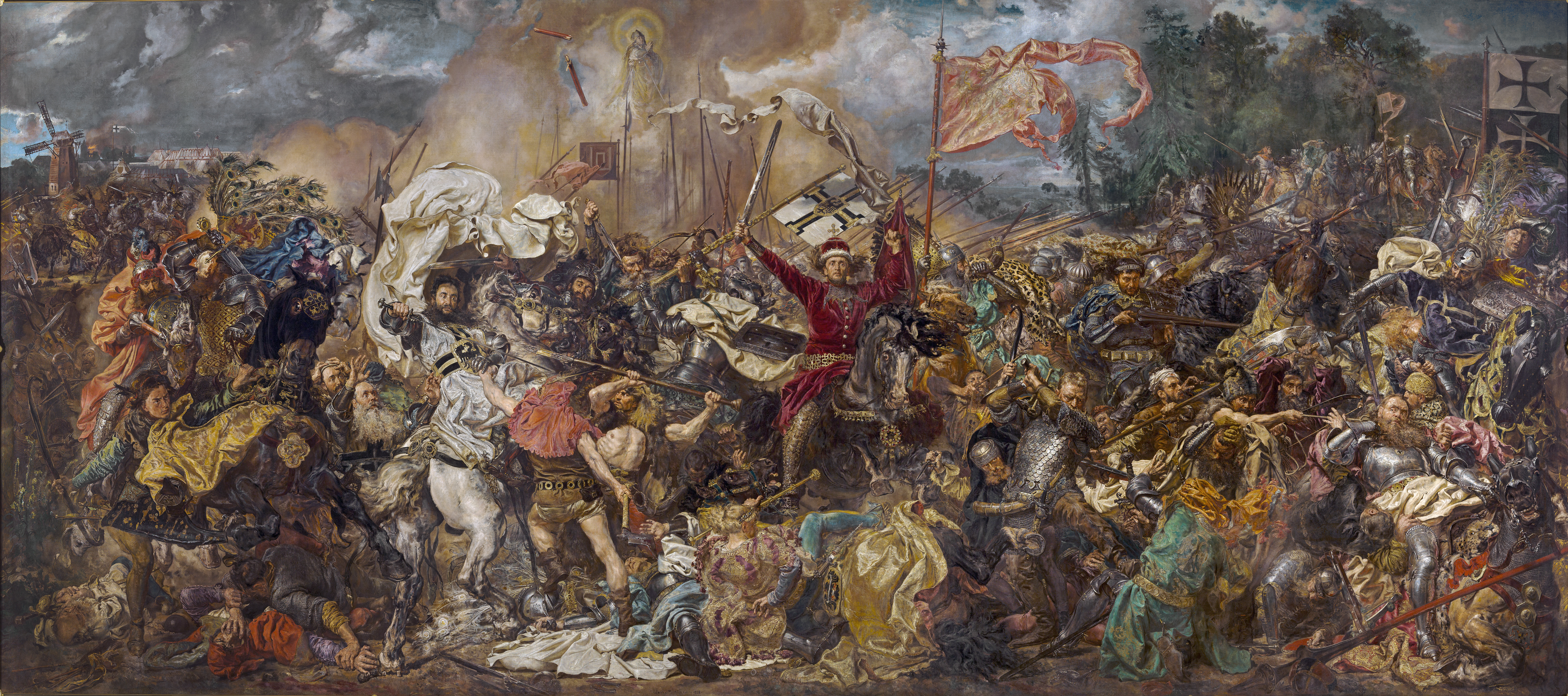

Marquard (or Markward) von Salzbach was a Teutonic Knight, who played a prominent role in shaping the relationship between the Knights and the Grand Duchy of Lithuania between 1389 and 1410.

He was taken captive in July 1384 by Vytautas, Grand Duke of Lithuania, after Vytautas reconciled with his cousin Jogaila during the Lithuanian Civil War (1381–1384). At the time Marquard was a castellan of New Marienburg, a Teutonic Castle on the Neman River. Marquard became a friend and close adviser of Vytautas, who sent him on diplomatic missions to establish alliance with the Knights when another civil war broke out in Lithuania in 1389. Marquard regained freedom and rejoined the Knights, becoming castellan of Ragnit and valued expert of Lithuanian affairs due to his fluent command of the Lithuanian language and intimate knowledge of the royal court.

When Vytautas turned against the Knights, Marquard fought against Lithuania in an attempt to conquer Samogitia. Marquard helped to negotiate the peace in the 1398 Treaty of Salynas and was able to bring 1,600 cavalry to support Vytautas in the 1399 Battle of the Vorskla River against the Golden Horde. The battle ended in a crushing defeat of the Lithuanians and Vytautas barely escaped alive. Of the Teutonic forces, only three knights escaped with a few low-rank soldiers.

After Vytautas-inspired first Samogitian uprising, Marquard accused Vytautas of treachery and almost derailed negotiations for the 1404 Peace of Raciąż. After conclusion of the treaty, Marquard further insulted Vytautas by attacking his murdered mother, Birutė. The personal conflict grew further, and was finally resolved during the 1410 Battle of Grunwald, where Marquard participated as Komtur of Brandenburg. According to Jan Długosz's notes in Banderia Prutenorum, he was taken prisoner by Długosz's father and then beheaded by Vytautas when he refused to apologize for the insult.
