= Friedeburgh =

Teutonic castle

Friedeburgh or Friedeburg was a short-lived castle of the Teutonic Order in Samogitia (exact location is unknown). It was built after the Treaty of Salynas was signed in 1398 and Samogitia was granted to the Knights by Vytautas, Grand Duke of Lithuania. The castle was to become administrative center of Samogitia.

Heinrich von Schwelborn was appointed as the vogt to facilitate territory's incorporation into the monastic state of the Teutonic Order (sometimes future Grand Master Michael Küchmeister von Sternberg is incorrectly given as the first vogt of Samogitia; he was appointed only after the Peace of Raciąż of 1404). The last recorded "Table of Honor" was held in Friedeburgh. The castle was burned in March 1401 by the Samogitians during the first Samogitian uprising.

The uprising was subdued in 1404, but the castle was not rebuilt immediately. Instead the Knights built new castles near the Dubysa River. Only in 1408 reconstruction works began. Teutonic records show that in spring 1409 four skilled carpenters and 30 men were working to rebuild the castle. The same year Samogitian rose against the Knights for the second time. Vytautas besieged the fortress and it had to surrender due to lack of food before reinforcements from Prussia could arrive.
