= Jerzy Nos =

Polish-Lithuanian politician

Jerzy Nos of Topór (Russian: Юрий Фёдорович Нос, Ukrainian: Юрій Федорович Ніс) was a mediaeval Polish-Lithuanian nobleman. Originally a starost of Drohiczyn and Mielnik, with time he rose to the rank of Prince of Polesia and governor of Pskov. He also held numerous posts in the administration of the Grand Duchy of Lithuania.

Little is known of his early life, though he was most likely a descendant of the Ruthenised Pinsk branch of the Gediminids. It is unclear if he is related to Jerzy Nos Narymuntowicz, son of Narimantas, who in 1398 acted as a diplomat for Vytautas and signed the Treaty of Salynas, as some sources consider them to be the same person.

During the 1406–1408 war fought by Grand Duke Vytautas against his son-in-law Vasili I of Moscow and Švitrigaila, Nos apparently fought for the earlier side. A major stand-off at Ugra River between the two armies ended without a battle in the Treaty of Ugra, by which Velikiy Novgorod was granted to Jogaila's brother Simeon Lingwen, and the important city of Pskov to Jerzy Nos, who acted as Jogaila's envoy.

Following the death of Grand Duke Vytautas, in 1432 Nos briefly served as the commander-in-chief of Lithuanian forces loyal to Švitrigaila and took part in the successful siege of the city of Lutsk.
