= Samogitian uprisings =

Military conflict

- Part of Northern Crusades
- Map of the Teutonic Knights (in salmon) ca. 1455. Samogitia (in rose) separated the Teutonic Knights in Prussia from the Livonian Order in the north. For Lithuania (in burgundy) it was the only access to the Baltic Sea.
Date	March 13, 1401 – May 22, 1404; May 26, 1409 – September 8, 1409
Location	Samogitia
Result	First uprising subdued Second uprising grew into the Polish–Lithuanian–Teutonic War

Belligerents
Grand Duchy of Lithuania: Duchy of Samogitia	Teutonic State

Commanders and leaders
(Grand Duchy of Lithuania) Vytautas (Duchy of Samogitia) Rumbaudas Valimantaitis	(State of the Teutonic Order) Konrad von Jungingen (State of the Teutonic Order) Ulrich von Jungingen; Švitrigaila

Samogitian uprisings refer to two uprisings by the Samogitians against the Teutonic Knights in 1401–1404 and 1409. Samogitia was granted to the Teutonic Knights by Vytautas the Great, Grand Duke of Lithuania, several times in order to enlist Knights' support for his other military affairs. The local population resisted Teutonic rule and asked Vytautas to protect them. The first uprising was unsuccessful and Vytautas had to reconfirm his previous promises to transfer Samogitia in the Peace of Raciąż. The second uprising provoked the Knights to declare war on Poland. Hostilities escalated and resulted in the Battle of Grunwald (1410), one of the biggest battles of medieval Europe. The Knights were soundly defeated by the joint Polish–Lithuanian forces, but Vytautas and Jogaila, King of Poland, were unable to capitalize on their victory. Conflicts regarding Samogitia, both diplomatic and military, dragged until the Treaty of Melno (1422).

== Background ==
=== Samogitia as an object of strategic interests ===
The Livonian Order was the first to attempt the conquest of Samogitia, but they were decisively defeated by the Samogitians in the Battle of Saule in 1236 and had to become a branch of the Teutonic Order. Continued crusade brought little territorial gains. Samogitia was important to the Knights as it physically separated the Teutonic Knights in Prussia from its branch in Livonia. The first opportunity to acquire Samogitia came only in 1383 when Jogaila formulated the Treaty of Dubysa. The treaty awarded Samogitia up to the Dubysa River to the Knights for their support to Jogaila against Vytautas in the Lithuanian Civil War (1381–84). However, it was not ratified and hostilities between Poland and the Knights broke out soon after. The Knights switched sides and now Vytautas granted Samogitia to the Knights twice – by the Treaty of Königsberg (1384) and Treaty of Lyck (1390). When Jogaila and Vytautas reconciled and broke those treaties, the Knights continued to wage a war against Samogitia and Lithuania. Eventually Vytautas agreed to the Treaty of Salynas, signed in October 1398, as he sought to stabilize the western front while preparing for a large expedition into east against the Golden Horde, resulting in the disastrous Battle of the Vorskla River.

=== Knights take control of Samogitia ===
According to the Treaty of Salynas, Samogitia was ceded to the Order and Vytautas agreed to help enforce the treaty. The Order attempted to take control of Samogitia: even if they had the legal title to the land, local population resisted Teutonic rule and had to be subdued. The Knights took 500 hostages into Prussia to discourage resistance, while loyal Samogitian nobles were rewarded with gifts (wool, salt, clothes). They also built two fortresses on the periphery of Samogitia – one with Vytautas's help near Nevėžis River and another (named Friedeburg) near the Dubysa River. Vytautas agreed to build the castle as compensation for two Teutonic fortresses he burnt during the Lithuanian Civil War (1389–92). The Knights continued to organize destructive raids. In February 1399, Teutonic and Livonian forces raided central Samogitia and locals were unable to mount effective defense. In winter 1400, Vytautas assisted the Knights in one of such raids: Samogitians asked for his help and wanted to surrender to him, but he refused and continued to follow the treaty with the Knights. Unable to resist and with no help coming from Vytautas, Samogitians surrendered to the Knights for the first time. In the summer of 1400, the Teutonic Grandmaster sent Heinrich von Schwelborn to govern Samogitia from castles in Kaunas and Friedeburgh.

The Knights tried to maintain friendly relationship with Vytautas: they warmly welcomed his wife Anna during her pilgrimage to the tomb of Dorothy of Montau and sent him gifts. However, soon disagreements arose when the Order demanded to return about 4,000 peasants who escaped into Lithuania. Vytautas argued that they were free people and had the right to choose where to live. The disagreement was not resolved via diplomatic means and grew into a war.

== First uprising ==
The fighting started on March 13, 1401, after the Union of Vilnius and Radom was ratified by Polish nobles in March assuring Vytautas of Polish support. Samogitians organized a local rebellion, capturing and burning the two newly built castles. The Teutonic soldiers were taken captives to exchange them for Samogitian hostages taken into Prussia. In fall 1401, the Knights raided Kaunas and Hrodna. Up to this point Vytautas did not officially support the rebels; the Knights suspected Vytautas was behind the uprising, but they were careful not to anger Vytautas and not to push him into a closer alliance with Jogaila. Jogaila's brother Švitrigaila joined the war in January 1402 on the side of the Teutonic Knights as he laid claims to the throne of the Grand Duchy of Lithuania. He confirmed the Treaty of Salynas in exchange for Order's military assistance and drew Vytautas into open war against the Knights.

In May 1402, Samogitians burned Memel (now Klaipėda). Vytautas joined the fight in 1402 by attacking Gotteswerder. The fortress surrendered after a three-day siege. In July, Švitrigaila lead the Knight's army south of Vilnius (Medininkai, Ashmyany, Šalčininkai) hoping to capture the capital city. These were the last Teutonic raids into the Lithuania proper. In April 1403, Lithuanians and Samogitians responded by raiding Dünaburg in Livonia. The Teutonic Knights also waged a propaganda war by sending multiple complaints to the Pope, church officials, and western rulers. They accused Vytautas of triple treachery for breaking treaties of 1384, 1390, and 1398. Vytautas responded that while Samogitia was ruled by a military order, established to spread Christianity, Samogitians were not yet baptized. Pope Boniface IX issued an edict prohibiting the Knights to attack Lithuania. When neither side could achieve decisive victory and Vytautas wished to concentrate his attention to troubles in Smolensk, both sides started negotiations in summer 1403. A temporary truce was signed in December and the Peace of Raciąż was concluded on May 22, 1404. In essence it confirmed the Treaty of Salynas. Vytautas agreed to transfer Samogitia and assist the Knight in subduing any rebellious residents. He also agreed not to accept any Samogitian families that might escape into Lithuania. In 1405 Vytautas put his words into action and helped the Knights to take control of environs of Raseiniai, Viduklė, Ariogala.

== Interim peace ==
The Knights took control of Samogitia and began rebuilding old and building new castles along the rivers. Königsburg was built on the Šušvė River near Josvainiai. Vytautas provided the manpower for construction, food, guns, and even garrison. The castle was manned by 40 Teutons and 400 Poles. The Samogitians unsuccessfully attacked the newly built castle in fall 1405. Other castles were built in Christmemel and rebuilt in Friedeburgh. Dobesinburg, completed in 1407 near the mouth of Dubysa, was to become the new capital of the region. The Knights attempted to implement their administrative system: they measured land, counted residents, appointed local officers, and sent their own colonists. They promoted the three-field crop rotation, which had potential of higher outputs but would eventually lead to higher taxes and serfdom. When Vytautas attempted to introduce similar reforms a decade later, he too faced resistance and revolts. Despite the reforms, there were no significant efforts to convert the pagan Samogitians into Christianity. Hundreds of Samogitians were taken as hostages into Prussia. Rebellious residents were punished and executed, while those who swore loyalty were awarded with expensive gifts. In a complaint submitted to the Council of Constance in 1417, the Samogitians listed many crimes and injustices perpetrated by the Knights. The Knights assisted Vytautas in his campaigns in Pskov, Veliky Novgorod, and Moscow. However, the friendly relationship between Vytautas and the Teutonic Knights was somewhat strained after election of Grand Master Ulrich von Jungingen, who was less inclined to ally with Lithuania.

== Second uprising ==
=== Local rebellion ===
At the end of 1408, when Vytautas was finished with his campaigns in the east, tensions rose between him and the Knights. In late 1408, Vytautas and Jogaila met in Navahrudak and agreed to support the Samogitians and provoke the Knights into declaring war against Poland. Poland had its own territorial quarrels with the Knights over the Dobrzyń Land and wanted to diminish Prussian influence in Lithuania while preserving the Polish–Lithuanian union. Samogitians, angered by a famine in 1408, rose again on May 26, 1409. They succeeded in taking and burning Christmemel, Friedeburgh, Dobesinburg; only Memel withstood the attacks. While Vytautas secretly supported Samogitians, officially he still adhered to the Peace of Raciąż. Vytautas openly rose against the Knights only in the summer of 1409 after the Knights arrested 20 ships loaded with grain sent by Jogaila from Thorn to relieve the famine. The incident highlighted importance of controlling trade in the Nemunas Delta. Vytautas sent his deputies (Rumbaudas Valimantaitis, Galminas, Getautas, Klausigaila, and Vasibutas) to command the rebellious forces. As uprising took over the entire region, Teutonic forces evacuated into Prussia. Švitrigaila once again allied with the Knights hoping to overthrow Vytautas and become the Grand Duke but he was arrested and imprisoned.

=== Escalation into regional war ===
When the Knights threatened that they would invade Lithuania, Poland, through archbishop Mikołaj Kurowski, declared its support to the Lithuanian cause and threatened to invade Prussia in return. In August 1409, the Knights declared war against Poland, which began the Polish–Lithuanian–Teutonic War. The Knights hoped to defeat Poland and Lithuania one by one and first invaded Poland. Wenceslaus, King of the Romans agreed to mediate the dispute and a truce was signed on September 8, 1409. Until it expired on June 24, 1410, both Lithuania and Poland were at peace. The Knights sought to break apart the Polish–Lithuanian union and Vytautas was even offered the crown of King of Lithuania. While all parties presented their arguments to the mediator, Vytautas and Jogaila agreed to a joint military campaign, which was executed in summer 1410. The joint Polish–Lithuanian forces soundly defeated the Teutonic Knights in the Battle of Grunwald, one of the biggest battles in medieval Europe. However, the cousins were not able to take advantage of the victory and did not capture much territory. The Peace of Thorn was signed in 1411. Samogitia was granted to Lithuania, but only for the lifetimes of Vytautas and Jogaila. It took two other brief wars, the Hunger War (1414) and Gollub War (1422), to sign the Treaty of Melno which resolved the dispute, assigning Samogitia to Lithuania.
