= Švitrigaila =

Grand Duke of Lithuania from 1430 to 1432

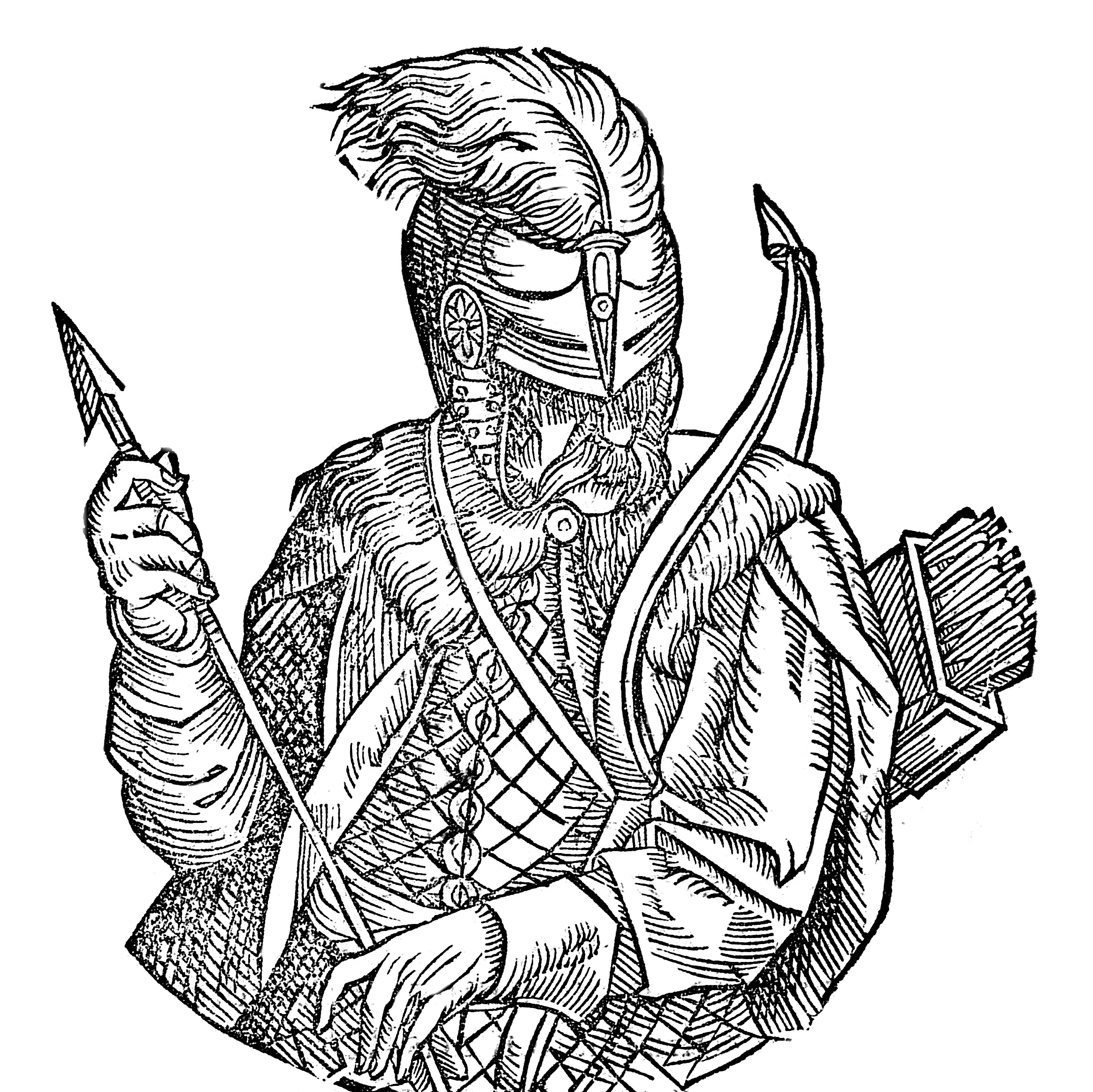
- Švitrigaila by Alexander Guagnini, 1581

Grand Duke of Lithuania
- Reign: October 1430 – 31 August 1432
- Predecessor: Vytautas and Jogaila
- Successor: Jogaila and Sigismund Kęstutaitis
- With: Jogaila (co-ruler; later in opposition)

Grand Duke of Ruthenia
- Reign: 1432–1440
- Predecessor: Vytautas
- Successor: Casimir IV

Prince of Volhynia
- Reign: 1434–1452
- Predecessor: Teodoras
- Successor: Simonas
- Born: Mid 1370s (possibly 1373); Vilnius, Grand Duchy of Lithuania
- Died: February 10,1452; Lutsk, Grand Duchy of Lithuania
- Burial: Cathedral Basilica of St Stanislaus and St Ladislaus of Vilnius
- Spouse: Elena Yurievna of Smolensk & Anna Ivanovna of Tver (Note: Anna of Tver was daughter of Ivan Ivanovich of Tver and granddaughter of Ivan Mikhailovich of Tver, Prince of Tver (1400–25). She died between 1471 and 1484. (Matusas (1991), p. 166))
- Issue: Son (died young)
- Dynasty: Gediminid
- Father: Algirdas
- Mother: Uliana of Tver
- Religion: Lithuanian paganism (mid-1370s–1377); Eastern Orthodox (1377–1386 and possibly since 1430); Roman Catholic (1386)

Švitrigaila (Note: sometimes spelled as Svidrigiello) (before 1370 – 10 February 1452) was Grand Duke of Lithuania from 1430 to 1432. He spent most of his life in largely unsuccessful dynastic struggles against his cousins Vytautas and Sigismund Kęstutaitis.

== Early life and Vitebsk rebellion ==
Švitrigaila was born to Algirdas, Grand Duke of Lithuania, and his second wife, Uliana of Tver. His date of birth is unknown, but it is believed that he was the youngest or second youngest son of Algirdas. He first appeared in politics in October 1382 when he witnessed the Treaty of Dubysa between his elder brother Jogaila and the Teutonic Knights. Historians believe that would indicate that at the time Švitrigaila was no younger than 12 which would put his date of birth sometime before 1370. In a complaint submitted to the Council of Florence, Švitrigaila claimed that he and Jogaila were favorite sons of Algirdas. Before his death in 1377, Algirdas transferred his throne to Jogaila but made him swear to make Švitrigaila his heir. Jogaila's representatives did not outright deny the arrangement and instead claimed that it had been modified by mutual agreement between the brothers.

In 1386, as part of the Christianization of Lithuania and union between Poland and Lithuania, Švitrigaila together with his brothers was baptized in the Roman Catholic rite in Kraków. His baptismal name was Bolesław.

Despite numerous power struggles in Lithuania, including a rebellion by Andrei of Polotsk, the conquest of the Principality of Smolensk, and the Lithuanian Civil War, the political activities of Švitrigaila are not mentioned until 1392. After the death of his mother, Jogaila appointed falconer Fedor Vesna as regent of the Principality of Vitebsk. This angered Švitrigaila and he rebelled against his brother. Vytautas, who just concluded the Ostrów Agreement to become regent of Lithuania, and Skirgaila gathered an army and captured Drutsk, Orsha, and then Vitebsk. Švitrigaila was captured and sent to Kraków. He was not held in a prison as demonstrated by the fact that he headed a commission for demarcation of the Lithuanian–Prussian border in 1393, but at the same time he had no territories.

== Struggle against Vytautas (1392–1430) ==
=== Defection to Hungary ===
Accounts on Švitrigaila's activities in 1394–1397 are conflicting. Older historians followed Jan Długosz and claimed that he escaped to the Teutonic Knights in Prussia right after the capture of Vitebsk, but Polish historian Aleksander Narcyz Przezdziecki disproved it. Probably around 1396 or 1397, Švitrigaila and Fedor, a son of Liubartas who was ousted from Volhynia near the conclusion of the Galicia–Volhynia Wars, escaped from Kraków to Duchy of Cieszyn, fief of the Kingdom of Bohemia, and from there to the court of Sigismund of Luxemburg. Švitrigaila contacted the Teutonic Knights, a long-standing enemy of Lithuania, and proposed an alliance against Vytautas. It was not an unprecedented move: Vytautas had done the same in 1382 and 1390 when he fought with Jogaila. However, the Knights concluded the Treaty of Salynas with Vytautas in October 1398 and Švitrigaila lost any hopes of an armed rebellion. He reconciled with Vytautas and received Navahrudak and a portion of Podolia not ruled by Spytek of Melsztyn.

In 1399, Švitrigaila survived the disastrous Battle of the Vorskla River against the Golden Horde. Spytek of Melsztyn was killed in the battle and Švitrigaila received his lands in Podolia.

=== Defection to Prussia ===
In January 1401, Vytautas and Lithuanian nobles concluded the Pact of Vilnius which made him the grand duke and confirmed that after Vytautas' death, Lithuania would be ruled by Jogaila and his heirs. That crushed Švitrigaila's ambition to one day become the grand duke of Lithuania. The chronicler Jan Długosz hinted that the pact was in part motivated by the desire to contain the growing influence and ambitions of Švitrigaila. According to Johann von Posilge, Švitrigaila was forced to sign the pact. However, just a month later, he wrote to Siemowit IV of Masovia trying to form an alliance against Vytautas.

Vytautas instigated the First Samogitian Uprising against the Teutonic Knights that started in March 1401. In August, Yury of Smolensk and his father-in-law, Oleg II of Ryazan, started a rebellion to retake the Principality of Smolensk. Švitrigaila decided to take advantage of these conflicts. In January 1402, instead of traveling to the wedding of Jogaila and Anna of Cilli, Švitrigaila, disguised as a merchant, traveled to Marienburg, the capital of the Teutonic Knights. On 2 March 1402, he concluded a treaty with the Knights which in essence confirmed the Treaty of Salynas. In July 1402, the Knights, including Švitrigaila, invaded Lithuania and marched towards Vilnius, the capital of Lithuania, however Vytautas learned of the planned treason and executed six city residents. The Knights did not dare to lay the siege and returned to Prussia. Vytautas wanted to concentrate on the rebellion in Smolensk and peace negotiations started in summer 1403. The truce was signed in December 1403 and the Peace of Raciąż in May 1404. The Knights received territorial concessions in Samogitia while Švitrigaila received Podolia (though the territory was de facto governed by Piotr Szafraniec), Zhydachiv, and an annual sum of 1,400 marks from the Wieliczka Salt Mine from Jogaila and the Principalities of Briansk, Chernigov, and Trubetsk from Vytautas.

=== Defection to Moscow and imprisonment ===
For a few years, Švitrigaila was loyal to Vytautas and helped to subdue Smolensk and negotiate with the Teutonic Knights regarding the Dobrzyń Land. Švitrigaila's new territories bordered the Grand Principality of Moscow, which began to emerge as the main rival to Lithuania. He decided to rebel against Vytautas once again but this time with the help of Vasily I of Moscow, who was also Vytautas' son-in-law. In May 1409, Švitrigaila, along with a great number of dukes and boyars, defected to Moscow. Vasily I rewarded Švitrigaila with Vladimir, Volokolamsk, Pereslavl, Rzhev, and half of Kolomna. Vytautas immediately gathered an army, including 5,000 Polish men commanded by Zbigniew of Brzezia and one flag of Teutonic Knights, and marched towards Russia. The two armies met on the Ugra River, but did not engage in battle. The Lithuanian army was exhausted and lacked food while the Russians needed to defend themselves from an invasion of the Golden Horde, commanded by Edigu. A peace treaty was concluded, which treated the Ugra River as the border between Russia and Lithuania.

It is not known what happened to Švitrigaila after the standoff at the Ugra River. According to a contemporary Teutonic report, Vytautas demanded that as a condition for peace Vasily I would surrender Švitrigaila, but Vasily I claimed that he had escaped to the Golden Horde. The report further elaborated that Švitrigaila received a marriage proposal to a daughter of a Tatar emir. However, in June 1409, Švitrigaila returned to the court of Vytautas. Restless, he again attempted to conspire with the Teutonic Knights, but the letters were intercepted. Švitrigaila was arrested and imprisoned in various locations until he was settled in the Kremenets Castle, the only brick castle in Volhynia. There he had at least some freedom as he signed land donations.

=== Escape to Hungary and reconciliation ===
Švitrigaila remained imprisoned for nine years until his escape was organized by Dashko Feodorovich Ostrogski, Aleksander Nos, and Alexander of Smolensk. During the night of 24 March 1418, the conspirators, with 500 men, invaded the Kremenets Castle (the gate was opened by two of their men who infiltrated castle security), freed Švitrigaila, and marched to Lutsk. The city was captured and Švitrigaila received support from local nobility, but instead of waging a war, he retreated to Wallachia. For a while, he lived with Ernest, Duke of Austria and Sigismund, King of Hungary.

At the same time, an anti-Vytautas rebellion broke out in Samogitia. The Teutonic Knights wanted to use that against Lithuania and invited Švitrigaila to overthrow Vytautas. Instead, Švitrigaila reconciled with Jogaila during a meeting between King Sigismund and Jogaila in Košice in May 1419. Švitrigaila received Opoczno and restored annual income from the Wieliczka Salt Mine. However, that did not reconcile him with Vytautas. After the failed mediation by King Sigismund between Lithuania and the Teutonic Knights, both Poland and Lithuania began preparing for the Gollub War. Polish nobles understood the importance of neutralizing Švitrigaila, who continued to receive Teutonic offers for an alliance, and sent a delegation to persuade Vytautas to forgive his cousin. Eventually, Vytautas relented and the official agreement was concluded in August 1420. Švitrigaila swore loyalty and received the principalities of Bryansk, Chernigov, Trubetsk, and Novgorod-Seversk.

After their reconciliation, Švitrigaila actively participated in state politics. In the spring of 1421, he won a battle against the Tatars; in the summer of 1422, he participated in the Gollub War and subsequent Treaty of Melno; in 1424–1426, he was sent to a diplomatic mission to Riga; he also took part in Vytautas' raid against Novgorod.

== Struggle against Sigismund ==
=== Grand Duke of Lithuania ===
Upon Vytautas's death in October 1430, Lithuanian nobles unilaterally elected Švitrigaila as the grand duke. This violated the terms of the Union of Horodło of 1413, where Lithuanians promised not to elect a new grand duke without the approval of the Kingdom of Poland. In order to receive Ruthenian votes, Švitrigaila granted equal rights to Catholic and Orthodox nobles – it was one lasting achievement of his brief reign. The Polish nobility, led by Zbigniew Oleśnicki, were outraged and demanded that Švitrigaila acknowledged his fealty to his brother Jogaila, the king of Poland. Švitrigaila refused and professed full independence. The conflict was further complicated by territorial disputes in Podolia and Volhynia, that according to an agreement in 1411 were to be ruled by Lithuania only for the lifetime of Vytautas.

Švitrigaila fought against the Polish–Lithuanian forces at Lutsk in Volhynia, and at the same time started organizing a wider anti-Polish coalition. In June 1431, an agreement was reached with the Teutonic Knights: the Knights declared war and without much opposition invaded Poland, whose forces were engaging Švitrigaila in Volhynia. In September a two-year truce between Poland, Lithuania, and the Teutonic Knights was signed in Staryi Chortoryisk. It was more favorable to Poland and it is not clear why Švitrigaila agreed to it. However, the truce did not solve the underlying dispute. The war turned into diplomatic struggle: Poland sought to turn Lithuanian nobles against Švitrigaila.

=== Coup and civil war ===
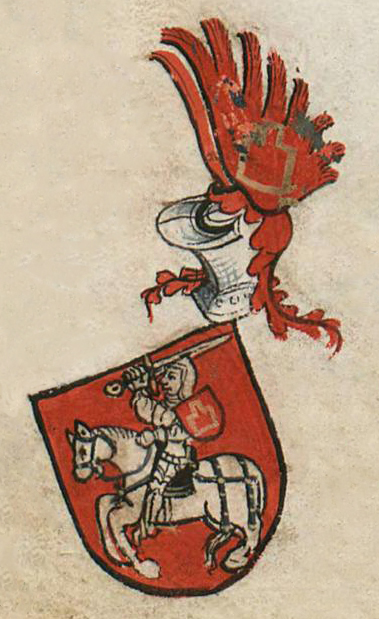
Coat of arms with Pogonia of Švitrigaila, circa 1440, who at the time ruled Ruthenian territories

Conspirators, led by Sigismund Kęstutaitis, attacked Švitrigaila and his escort, who were staying in Ashmyany for the night of 31 August 1432. Švitrigaila managed to escape to Polotsk while his pregnant wife Anna of Tver was detained. It is unclear what groups supported Sigismund and why. Possibly Lithuanian nobles were dissatisfied with favors Švitrigaila showed to Orthodox dukes, but before the coup no such opposition manifested itself. Sigismund, who did not play a major role in Lithuanian politics before the coup and who initially supported Švitrigaila, became the grand duke and resumed policy of union with Poland.

Lithuania was divided into two camps: supporters of Sigismund (Lithuanian lands, Samogitia, Podlaskie, Grodno, Minsk) to the west, and supporters of Švitrigaila (Polotsk, Vitebsk, Smolensk, Kiev, Volhynia) to the east. Three years of devastating hostilities began. Švitrigaila enlisted help from Sayid Ahmad I, the khan of the Golden Horde. Both sides suffered heavy losses during the battle of Ashmyany, and the final victory in the battle of Wiłkomierz went to Sigismund in 1435. After the defeat, Švitrigaila fled to Polotsk. Losing his influence in the Slavic principalities, he attempted to reconcile with Poland in September 1437: he would rule lands that still supported him (chiefly Kiev and Volhynia) and after his death the territories would pass to the king of Poland. However, the Polish Senate did not ratify this treaty under strong protest from Sigismund. Švitrigaila retreated to Moldavia in 1438.

== Later years and death ==
In 1440, Sigismund Kęstutaitis was assassinated by nobles who supported Švitrigaila, and Švitrigaila returned to rule Podolia and Volhynia. At the age of 70 (or 85, according to some sources), he was too old to resume his struggle for the Lithuanian throne and more importantly had no support from the Council of Lords led by Jonas Goštautas, that in June 1440 elected Casimir Jagiellon, brother of Polish King Władysław III as the grand duke. Shortly before his death in Lutsk in 1452, he bequeathed all his possessions in Podolia and Volhynia to the Lithuanian state.

Švitrigaila died on 10 February 1452 in Lutsk and was buried at the Kiev Pechersk Lavra.

== Ancestry ==
Ancestors of Švitrigaila

8. Butvydas
4. Gediminas
2. Algirdas
10. possibly Ivan of Polotsk
5. Jaunė
1. Svitrigaila
12. Mikhail of Tver
6. Aleksandr Mikhailovich of Tver
13. Anna of Kashin
3. Uliana of Tver
14. Yuri I of Galicia
7. Anastasia of Halych
15. Euphemia of Kuyavia

== Notes ==
Švitrigaila Gediminids Born: before 1370 Died: 10 February 1452
Royal titles
Preceded by Jogaila and Vytautas	Grand Duke of Lithuania with Jogaila as Supreme Duke; 1430–1432	Succeeded by Jogaila and Sigismund
Preceded by Vytautas	Grand Duke of Ruthenia; 1432–1440	Succeeded by Casimir IV
Preceded by Teodoras	Prince of Volhynia; 1434–1452	Succeeded by Simonas
