= Gotteswerder =

- Island at the confluence of Nemunas and Nevėžis

Site information
- Type: Castle

Location
- Coordinates: 54°55′51″N 23°45′20″E

Site history
- Built: Built in 1363 (wood); Rebuilt (brick) in 1368
- Built by: Grand Duchy of Lithuania; Teutonic Order
- Materials: Wood, brick
- Battles/wars: 1363, 1366, 1367, 1368
- Events: Lithuanian Crusade

Gotteswerder (Lithuanian: Gotesverderis) was a Teutonic castle in the vicinity of Kaunas, constructed during the Lithuanian Crusade in the currently non-existent island of Virgalė, which was located at the confluence of Nemunas and Nevėžis. First built by the Grand Duchy of Lithuania in 1363, the castle was captured by the Teutonic Order in 1368.

== History ==
=== Construction ===
After the destruction of the Kaunas Castle in 1362, the Lithuanians hurried to rebuild. They chose Vyrgalė island, about 7 km (4.3 mi) below Kaunas. This New Kaunas was destroyed in April 1363 along with Veliuona and Pieštvė. This severely weakened Lithuanian defenses along the Neman and started the most intense period of attacks towards central Lithuania, including Vilnius and Trakai.

Lithuanians rebuilt New Kaunas. The castle was threatened by the Teutonic Order in 1366 (raid led by Duke William II of Berg) and 1367 (raid led by marshal Henning Schindekop). The Teutonic Order attacked again and destroyed the wooden fortifications after a two-day battle in 1368. Lithuanians decided to rebuild a brick castle. In spring 1369, the Teutonic Order attacked and captured the unfinished construction. Using the materials brought by the Lithuanians, they finished the construction in April–May 1368 and named the castle Gotteswerder. It was the easternmost stronghold of the State of the Teutonic Order at the time.

Just few months after its construction, Gotteswerder was captured after a five-week siege by the Grand Ducal Lithuanian Army led by Algirdas and Kęstutis. The Lithuanians did not destroy the castle, but reinforced it with two additional wooden fortifications. The Teutonic Order counterattacked in November 1368. The castle fell in five days. 54 Lithuanians were killed, 109 died in fire, and 309 were taken prisoners.

=== Later history ===
Historians believe that Gotteswerder was destroyed by Vytautas when he reconciled with Jogaila at the end of the Lithuanian Civil War (1389–1392). In June 1398, Vytautas helped the Teutonic Order rebuilding the castle as he made peace with the order in preparation for a large campaign against the Golden Horde which resulted in the Battle of the Vorskla River.

In March 1402, Vytautas captured and burned Gotteswerder during the First Samogitian Uprising. It is believed that the castle was rebuilt and was used by the Teutonic Order when attempting to subjugate Samogitia in 1404–1409.
