= Anna, Grand Duchess of Lithuania =

Anna
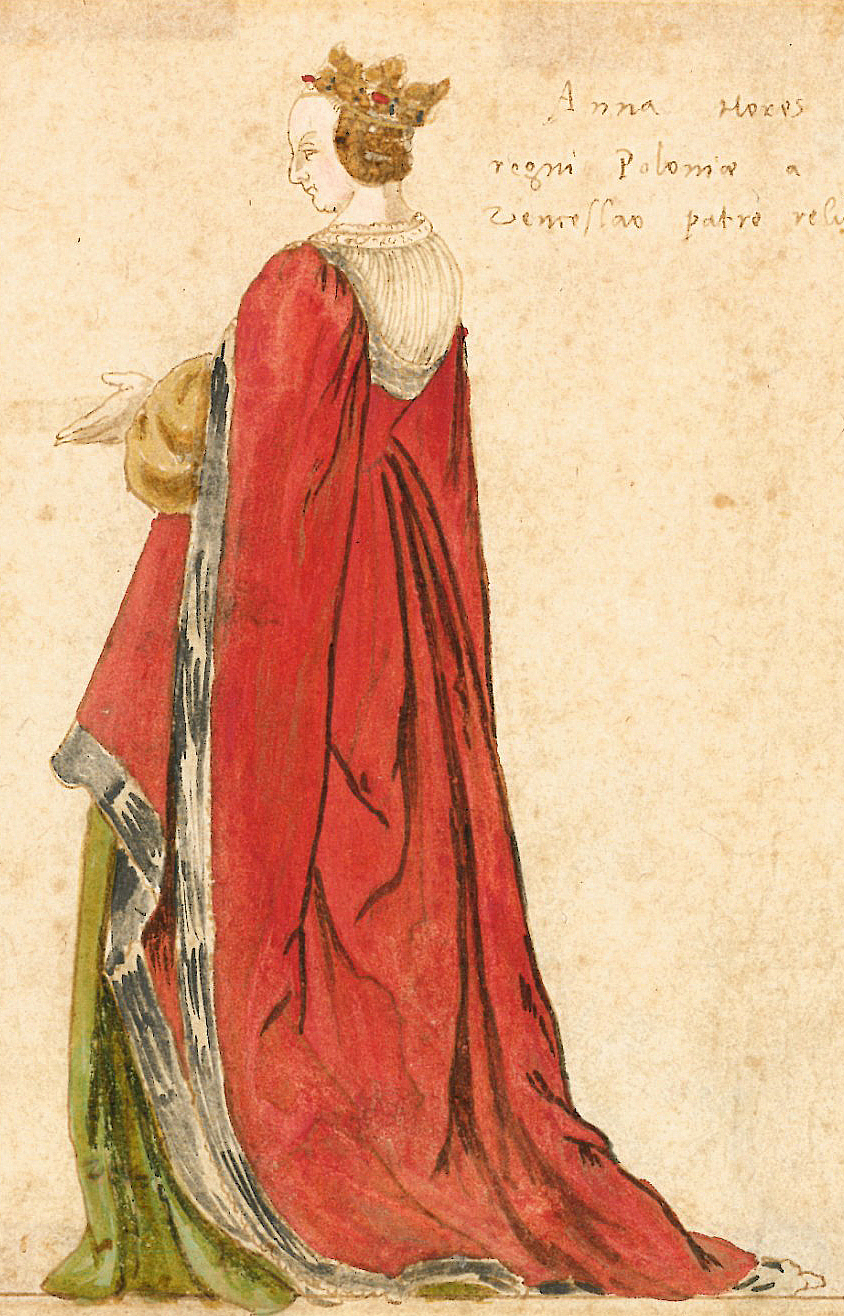
- 16th-century miniature of Anna

Grand Duchess consort of Lithuania
- Tenure: 1401 – 31 July 1418
- Born: c. 1350
- Died: 31 July 1418 (aged 67–68); Trakai, Grand Duchy of Lithuania
- Burial: Vilnius Cathedral, Vilnius
- Spouses: Vytautas
- Issue: Sophia
- House: Kęstutis (by marriage)
- Father: disputed

Anna or Ona Vytautienė (died on 31 July 1418 in Trakai) was Grand Duchess of Lithuania (1401–1418). She was probably the first wife of Vytautas the Great, Grand Duke of Lithuania, as well mother of his only known child, Sophia, the wife of Vasily I of Moscow. She is best remembered for helping Vytautas to escape from a prison in Kreva in 1382 and thus probably saving his life. Little is known about Anna's life and even her origins remain disputed by historians.

== Life ==
=== During the civil wars ===
Likely Anna and Vytautas were married between 1368 and 1377 or around 1370. Anna first comes to light in 1382 when her husband was imprisoned in the Kreva Castle by his cousin Jogaila during the Lithuanian Civil War (1381–1384). While all accounts agree that she freed her husband, details vary from source to source. It is unclear how much freedom Anna had in Kreva and if she was guarded. It is written in the Lithuanian Chronicles that she had two maids with her. She convinced one of them to exchange clothes with Vytautas who then escaped undetected. Chronicler Wigand of Marburg claimed that Vytautas dressed in Anna's clothes rather than in one of Anna's maids. It is believed that Anna remained in Kreva and no information is available on how she escaped or was released. Historian Teodor Narbutt (1784–1864) later added many colorful details to the story, including Vytautas illness and maid Alena, who sacrificed herself to save her master.

In 1389, when her husband's coup to capture Vilnius failed, she was in Hrodna. After the failed coup Anna followed her husband to the Teutonic Knights, where Vytautas asked for an alliance against his cousins Jogaila and Skirgaila in the Lithuanian Civil War (1389–1392). For a while she was held hostage to guarantee that Vytautas would not break the alliance. After the disagreements were settled in 1392, Anna confirmed the Ostrów Agreement, the peace treaty which made Vytautas the regent of Lithuania in the name of his cousin. She signed two letters, one given to Jogaila and another to his wife Jadwiga of Poland. Anna continued to be active in political life and attended negotiations for the Treaty of Salynas (1398).

=== During her husband's rule ===
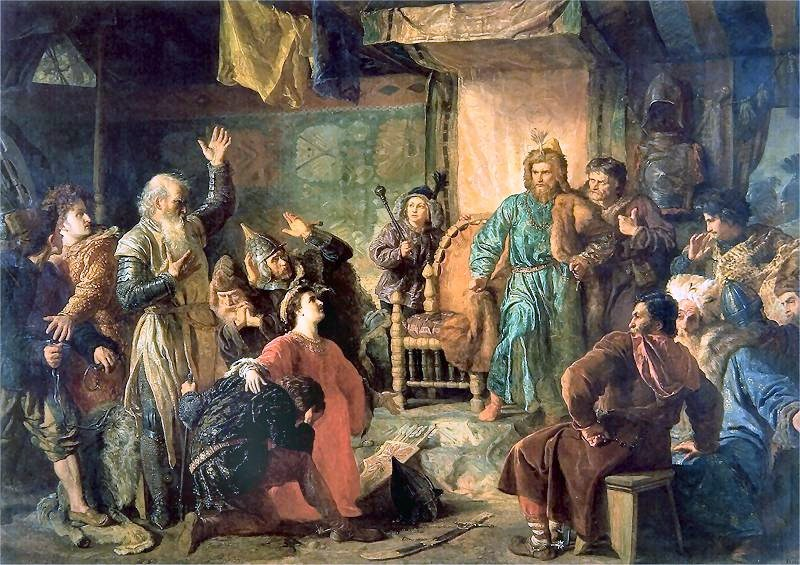
Kęstutis and his son Vytautas imprisoned in Kreva by Jogaila in 1382. Kęstutis died within a week. Vytautas remained locked up for a couple of months before being saved by his wife Anna.

Before 1396, she and her husband traveled to Késmárk to meet King Sigismund of Hungary to establish a friendly relationship. While they spoke for a long time, a fire broke out burning half of the city, leading the Hungarian nobles to suspect Vytautas's people. Sigismund intervened and cleared up the situation, resuming the negotiations. After the visit was finished, Vytautas and his wife Anna gave many presents to Sigismund including a coat, a hat and gloves made of sable fur and embroidered in gold. Details of all these presents "given by Vytautas's wife" were recorded in a 15th-century chronicle by Eberhard Windeck, a close associate of Sigismund of Hungary.

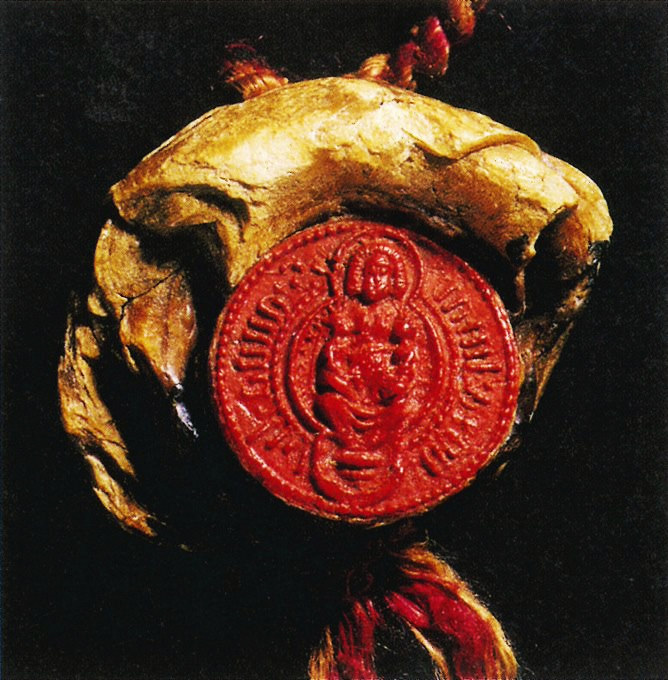
Personal royal seal of Anna

In 1400, Anna visited the tomb of Dorothea of Montau in Marienwerder (modern Kwidzyn), and prayed in the churches of Saint Anne in Brandenburg and of Saint Barbara in Oldenburg. She was accompanied by her brother-in-law Sigismund Kęstutaitis and an escort of 400 men. Anna was greeted with expensive gifts and lavish receptions.

==== Grand Duchess of Lithuania ====
In 1401, the Pact of Vilnius and Radom officially declared Vytautas the Grand Duke of Lithuania, under suzereinty of Jogaila as the Supreme Duke, therefore making Anna the Grand Duchess consort.

Anna continued to maintain good relationship with the Teutonic Knights, who sent her expensive gifts, including a clavichord and portative organ in 1408 and rare wine in 1416. After her death, all churches in Prussia were ordered to hold requiem masses. Various chronicles and documents recorded much less positive interaction between Anna and Poland.

It is believed that St. Anne's Church, built in Vilnius Lower Castle before 1390, was so named in Anna's honor. It was later known as St. Barbara's Church but did not survive to the present. Flemish traveler Guillebert de Lannoy wrote favorably about the Grand Duchess.

After her death in 1418, Vytautas wanted to marry her niece Uliana Olshanska, daughter of Ivan Olshanski. Polish historian Jan Długosz asserts that Ivan of Karachev, first husband of Uliana, was murdered by Vytautas in order to marry her. The Bishop of Vilnius refused the ceremony due to their close relationship (Vytautas was Uliana's uncle-in-law) and demanded they seek approval from the pope. Eventually the Bishop of Włocławek performed the ceremony.

== Family ==
=== Origin ===
There is considerable debate about who the parents of Anna were. According to the Bychowiec Chronicle, a late and unreliable source, Anna was a sister of Yuri Svyatoslavich, the last sovereign ruler of the Principality of Smolensk. For a long time this was the only theory about her origins.

In 1933, Lithuanian historian Ignas Jonynas published a study in which he attempted to debunk the Bychowiec Chronicle and demonstrate that Anna was not an Orthodox duchess from Slavic lands, but a daughter of a local Lithuanian noble. Jonynas pointed out that no other contemporary source mentions the relationship between Vytautas and Yuri even though Lithuania and Smolensk were at war several times. The First Lithuanian Chronicle, the basis for which was written while Vytautas was still alive, describes how wars against Smolensk were waged in 1386, 1395, 1401, and 1404, but mentions nothing about Vytautas and Yuri being in-laws. Jonynas argued that Anna was a sister of Sudimantas, a nobleman from Eišiškės and commander of Vytautas' army. Teutonic Chronicle mentions Sudimantas as swoger of Vytautas. At the time swoger meant brother-in-law. Another document from 1416 refers to Sudimantas as magen, which denoted a relative, usually related by blood. Since Jonynas' study, Sudimantas has been variously presented as Anna's brother, father, or sister's husband.

In his 1995 article, Polish historian Jan Tęgowski disagreed with Jonynas and argued that the Bychowiec Chronicle was correct. He argued that Sudimantas was married to a sister of Anna. Tęgowski's main argument that Anna was from Smolensk rested on two documents from 1413 that mention a "Russian duke Basil" as Vytautas's brother-in-law. Tęgowski identified this Basil as a son of Sviatoslav IV of Smolensk. Lithuanian historian Inga Baranauskienė refuted this identification since the only known Basil from Smolensk was a son of Ivan, Sviatoslav's brother. She also analyzed the overall relationship between Smolensk and Lithuania noting it was mostly adversary. Further, she noted that Anna had two sisters who were married to local Lithuanian nobles which would be virtually impossible if they were daughters of the Prince of Smolensk.

=== Sisters ===
Flemish traveler Guillebert de Lannoy mentioned that he was received by two sisters of Anna when he visited Vilnius in 1413. A 1390 complaint written by Vytautas against cousins Jogaila and Skirgaila mentioned that his wife's sister was married to his close associate Ivan Olshanski. A memorial book from a monastery in Liubech recorded her name as Agrippina (these books recorded names of the deceased so that they could be remembered in prayers). Ivan and Agrippina had at least four sons and a daughter (Uliana Olshanska who married Vytautas after Anna's death). Another sister of Anna was mentioned by historian Jan Długosz (1415–1480). He recorded that Julijona, sister of Anna, was married to Narimantas who was murdered by Vytautas during an attack on Vilnius in 1390; Julijona later married Albertas Manvydas, the first Voivode of Vilnius. The Latin version of the 1390 complaint by Vytautas recorded a different version – before her marriage to Albertas Manvydas, she was married to Butrimas, a cousin of Vytautas, who was murdered in retribution for the hanging of Vaidila.

Regnal titles
Preceded by Jadwiga Anjou	Grand Duchess consort of Lithuania; 1401 – 1418 with Anna of Celje (1402–1416) and Elisabeth of Pilica (1417–1418)	Succeeded by Elisabeth of Pilica
