= Ostrów Agreement =

1392 treaty ending the Lithuanian Civil War

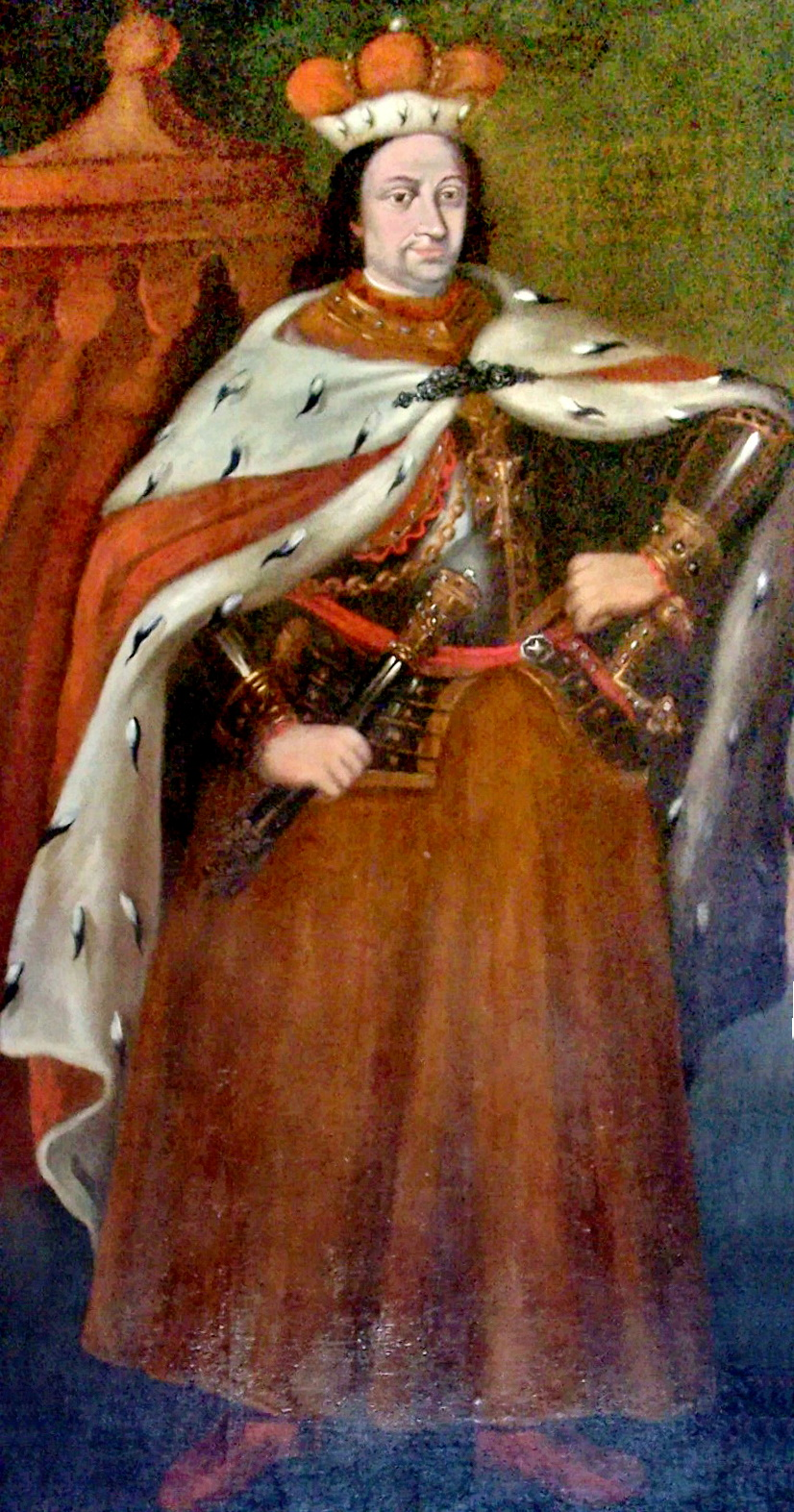
Vytautas the Great, 17th-century painting

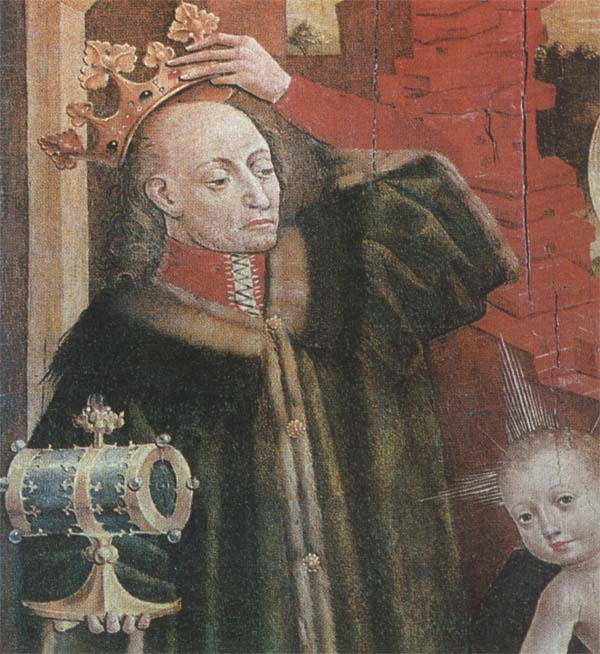
Presumed image of Jogaila, painted around 1475–1480, Kraków, Poland

The Ostrów or Astrava Agreement (Lithuanian: Astravos sutartis, Belarusian: Востраўскае пагадненне, Polish: Ugoda w Ostrowie) was a treaty between Jogaila (Władysław II Jagiełło), King of Poland and Grand Duke of Lithuania, and his cousin Vytautas the Great, signed on 4 August 1392. The treaty ended the destructive Lithuanian Civil War, launched in 1389 by Vytautas who hoped to gain political power, and concluded the power struggle between the two cousins that erupted in 1380 after Jogaila secretly signed the Treaty of Dovydiškės with the Teutonic Knights. According to the treaty Vytautas became ruler of Lithuania on behalf of his cousin (though he de facto wielded power of the Grand Duke). The Ostrów Agreement did not stop attacks from the Teutonic Knights and the territorial dispute over Samogitia continued up to 1422. The details of the Polish–Lithuanian relationship were clarified in several later treaties, including the Union of Vilnius and Radom in 1401 (which made Vytautas a formal Grand Duke alongside Jogaila) and Union of Horodło in 1413.

== Background ==
In 1389, Vytautas started a civil war against Skirgaila, Jogaila's unpopular regent in Lithuania. Skirgaila was appointed after Jogaila signed the Union of Krewo in 1385 and was crowned King of Poland in 1386. The Lithuanians were dissatisfied with the growing Polish influence in Lithuania. Vytautas promised Samogitia to the Teutonic Knights in reward for their military assistance. Their joint armies made frequent incursions into Lithuania; the largest attack was launched in the early fall of 1390 when Vilnius was besieged for five weeks. Invaders managed to capture the Crooked Castle and turn much of the suburbs into ruins, but failed to take the city. Both sides realized that a quick victory would be impossible and raids were devastating the same country which they sought to rule. Polish nobles were dissatisfied that Jogaila spent so much attention on Lithuanian matters and that the Union of Krewo did not bring the expected results. In such situation Jogaila decided to seek a compromise with Vytautas.

== Negotiations and treaty ==
Jogaila sent a secret envoy, Henry of Masovia, Bishop of Płock, to negotiate with Vytautas and convince him to accept Jogaila's compromise. The negotiations were started in the Ritterswerder Castle on an island the Neman River near Kaunas, where Vytautas resided at the time. To avoid arousing the suspicion of the Teutonic Knights, Henry proposed to Vytautas' sister Rymgajla and they soon married. The quick marriage of a Catholic official (though he had not received the Holy Orders of priesthood) and his sudden death within a year were scandalous and sparked many rumors and speculations.

Vytautas accepted Jogaila's proposal, but could not act immediately, as the Knights held many Vytautas' relatives as hostages. It took some time for him to receive permission from the Knights to transfer the relatives to relative safety. For example, his wife Anna was freed so that she could travel to Lithuania and spread pro-Lithuanian rumors and convert remaining pagans; many nobles were asked to take part in military campaigns. In July 1392 Vytautas openly turned against the Teutonic Knights. He spread false rumors that the army of Jogaila and Skirgaila was moving towards Hrodna and organized his forces for a campaign against them. However, instead of marching to Hrodna, Vytautas attacked Ritterswerder and two other understaffed Teutonic castles on the Neman River before returning to Vilnius. His brother Sigismund Kęstutaitis remained in Prussia as prisoner until the Treaty of Salynas in 1398. Simon Grunau spread a false rumor that Iwan and Georg, two young sons of Vytautas, were poisoned by a knight to revenge their father for the betrayal. No reliable historical sources know about such incident or any sons that Vytautas fathered.

During the summer Jogaila met Vytautas in person in the place called Ostrowo. The exact location of the agreement is not known, due to the popularity of such toponym in the region. The most likely place where the two rulers met is Ostrów Lubelski, close to the border of both countries. Another possible location is Ostrovo mansion near Lida in modern Belarus. Its exact location is not known, but one suggested site is near Dzitva River to the east of the village of Yantsavichy. Jogaila handed over the government of Lithuania to his cousin in exchange for peace. Vytautas became his regent and Grand Duke in all but name. Skirgaila was removed from the Duchy of Trakai to become Duke of Kiev. The treaty was ratified in separate documents of the Polish and Lithuanian states as well as in separate documents signed by Anna, wife of Vytautas, and Jadwiga, wife of Jogaila. The treaty was enacted in several phases, adjusting the equivocal points stated in the Union of Krewo. The treaty strengthened Lithuania's central government as well.

== Aftermath ==
Vytautas started his formal regency in the Grand Duchy on his cousin's behalf. It is not entirely known what powers were given to him by Jogaila, but he had considerable independence. He replaced some of Jogaila's brothers and supporters with trusted viceroys appointed from Lithuanian nobles: Skirgaila was removed from Polotsk, Švitrigaila from Vitebsk, Kaributas from Severian Novgorod, Vladimir from Kiev, Fyodor Koriatovych from Podolia, and Fyodor Lubartovich from Volhynia. He also made territorial secession in 1398 without approval from Jogaila. While Skirgaila always signed documents first in the name of Jogaila and only then in his own name, Vytautas used only his own name. Lithuania was drifting away from Poland, but the defeat of Vytautas army in the Battle of the Vorskla River against the Golden Horde in 1399 forced to renew the union and conclude the Union of Vilnius and Radom in 1401. It legalized Vytautas as the Grand Duke (Magnus Dux), making him formally co-ruler to Jogaila, who himself adopted the higher title Supreme Prince (Prince Supremus). Thus Vytautas recognized that he was Jogaila's vassal whose lands upon his death would pass to the King of Poland. The two countries turned their joint forces against the Teutonic Knights delivering a crushing defeat in the Battle of Grunwald in 1410.

The Ostrów Agreement ended the civil war and over decade of power struggle, but not the war with the Teutonic Knights. They sought Samogitia, which was promised to them by Vytautas. In January 1393 Hrodna fell; in 1394 a large army assembled in Prussia. Grand Master Konrad von Jungingen led crusaders to Kaunas and then south along the Neman River to Merkinė. One body of the invaders was left to plunder the countryside and secure route of retreat, another marched about sixty miles east of Hrodna, and the main force reached Navahrudak deep inside Lithuania. Later the same year another campaign was organized. The crusaders marched through Kernavė and on 29 August 1394 attacked Vilnius. While the siege failed it prompted Vytautas to start negotiations. He was still busy establishing his newly acquired power in the east. The Knights contemplated expedition against the Victual Brothers in Gotland as their piratical activities interfered with trade of the Hanseatic League. A preliminary truce was signed in 1396 and final Treaty of Salynas in 1398. It was only a temporary peace and hostilities would lead to the Battle of Grunwald in 1410 and would drag until the Treaty of Melno in 1422.
