= Treaty of Salynas =

1398 treaty between Lithuania and the Teutonic Knights

Map of the Teutonic Knights (in salmon) c. 1455 – Samogitia (in rose) separated the Teutonic Knights in Prussia from the Livonian Order in the north. For Lithuania (in burgundy) it was the only access to the Baltic Sea.

The Treaty of Salynas (German: Frieden von Sallinwerder; Lithuanian: Salyno sutartis) was a peace treaty signed on 12 October 1398 by Vytautas the Great, the ruler of Lithuania, and Konrad von Jungingen, the Grand Master of the Teutonic Knights. It was signed on an islet of the Neman River, probably between Kulautuva and the mouth of the Nevėžis River. It was the third time, after the Treaty of Königsberg (1384) and Treaty of Lyck (1390), that Vytautas promised Samogitia to the Knights. The territory was important to the Knights as it physically separated the Teutonic Knights in Prussia from its branch in Livonia. It was the first time that the Knights and Vytautas attempted to enforce the cession of Samogitia. However, it did not solve the territorial disputes over Samogitia and they dragged on until the Treaty of Melno in 1422.

== Background ==
When Jogaila, the Grand Duke of Lithuania, married Jadwiga of Poland and was crowned as King of Poland in 1386, he appointed his unpopular brother Skirgaila as viceroy for Lithuania. Vytautas seized the opportunity to renew his struggle for power and started the Lithuanian Civil War of 1389–1392. He allied himself with the Teutonic Knights, promising them Samogitia. However, Jogaila and Vytautas reconciled in 1392 by signing the Treaty of Astrava. The Knights, betrayed by Vytautas, invaded Lithuania in 1394 and unsuccessfully besieged Vilnius for three weeks. The invaders were driven away by joint Lithuanian and Polish forces, demonstrating that the old raids were no longer effective against the new Polish–Lithuanian alliance. A truce between Vytautas and the Knights was signed in 1396. Vytautas needed to secure his western front as he was planning a massive campaign against the Golden Horde, which resulted in a disaster at the Battle of the Vorskla River in 1399.

== Treaty ==
Vytautas' friend and former captive, Marquard von Salzbach, helped to negotiate the agreement. A preliminary treaty was signed on 23 March 1398, in Hrodna; it was finalized in October 1398. According to the treaty Samogitia was ceded to the Knights roughly up to the Nevėžis River, leaving the mouth of Nevėžis in Vytautas' hands. For the first time the Order also received a portion of Sudovia, an almost uninhabited territory north and west of the Šešupė River. The treaty recognized spheres of influence: Veliky Novgorod for Vytautas and Pskov for the Knights. Vytautas also promised to help the Knights build two new castles as compensation for castles he burned in 1392. The Knights promised to help Vytautas in his campaign against the Tatars. The treaty also guaranteed freedom of trade. Sigismund Kęstutaitis and other hostages kept by the Knights since the Civil War were released.

During the week-long celebration following successful negotiations, Lithuanian nobles declared their loyalty to Vytautas as their leader and it's possible that they even proclaimed him the King of Lithuania. While such a declaration had no political force, it was a reply to demands by Jadwiga of Poland to pay Polish taxes. It showed their determination to keep the Grand Duchy of Lithuania separate from the Kingdom of Poland despite the Union of Krewo in 1385. Such a proclamation, known only from the chronicles of Johann von Posilge, raised doubts as to reliability among Polish historians. The treaty is noted among Lithuanian historians as it showed the extent of Vytautas' power in Lithuania: he made territorial concessions without approval from Jogaila, who theoretically was the Supreme Duke of Lithuania.

== Aftermath ==
After signing the treaty, the Order attempted to take control of Samogitia. They took many hostages into Prussia and presented Samogitian nobles with gifts such as wool, salt, and clothes. They also built fortresses – one with Vytautas' help near the Nevėžis River and another (named Friedeburg) near Dubysa. The Knights tried to maintain a friendly relationship with Vytautas, warmly welcoming his wife Anna during her pilgrimage to the tomb of Dorothy of Montau, and sent him gifts. However, disagreements soon arose when the Order demanded the return of about 4,000 peasants who had escaped into Lithuania. Vytautas argued that they were free people and had the right to choose where to live. The disagreement grew into a war.

Vytautas renounced the Lithuanian sovereignty over Pskov which had been under Lithuanian influence in the second half of 14th century, and accepted that it was in the Teutonic Order's sphere of influence. Instead, the Order agreed to help the Lithuanians conquer Novgorod. This caused Pskov to accept the suzerainty of the Grand Principality of Moscow in 1399.

In March 1401, Vytautas signed the Union of Vilnius and Radom and was recognized as the Grand Duke alongside Jogaila. Assured of Polish support, he violated the treaty, supporting a local rebellion of the Samogitians, capturing and burning the two newly built castles. In the fall of 1401, the Knights raided Kaunas and Hrodna; in May 1402, the Samogitians burned Klaipėda. Vytautas joined the conflict in 1402 by attacking Gotteswerder. Jogaila's brother Švitrigaila joined the war on the side of the Teutonic Knights as he had laid claim to the throne of the Grand Duchy of Lithuania. He confirmed the Treaty of Salynas in exchange for Order's military assistance.

However, neither side could achieve decisive victory, and Vytautas wished to concentrate his attention on troubles in Smolensk, so the Treaty of Raciąż was signed on 22 May 1404. It mirrored the Treaty of Salynas, but did not solve the disputes. The second Samogitian uprising in 1409 resulted in the Battle of Grunwald in 1410.
