= Yury of Smolensk =

Prince of Smolensk and Bryansk (r. 1386–1395; 1401–1404)

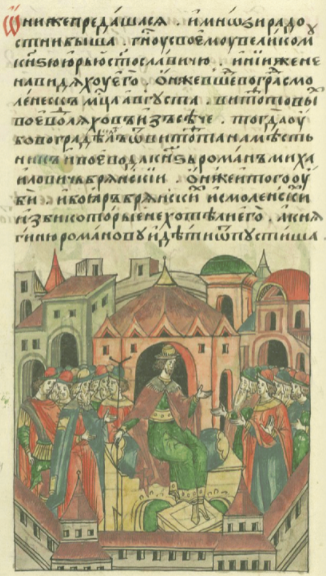
- Died: 14 September 1407
- Issue Anastasia of Smolensk, Fyodor Yuryevich
- Father: Sviatoslav IV of Smolensk

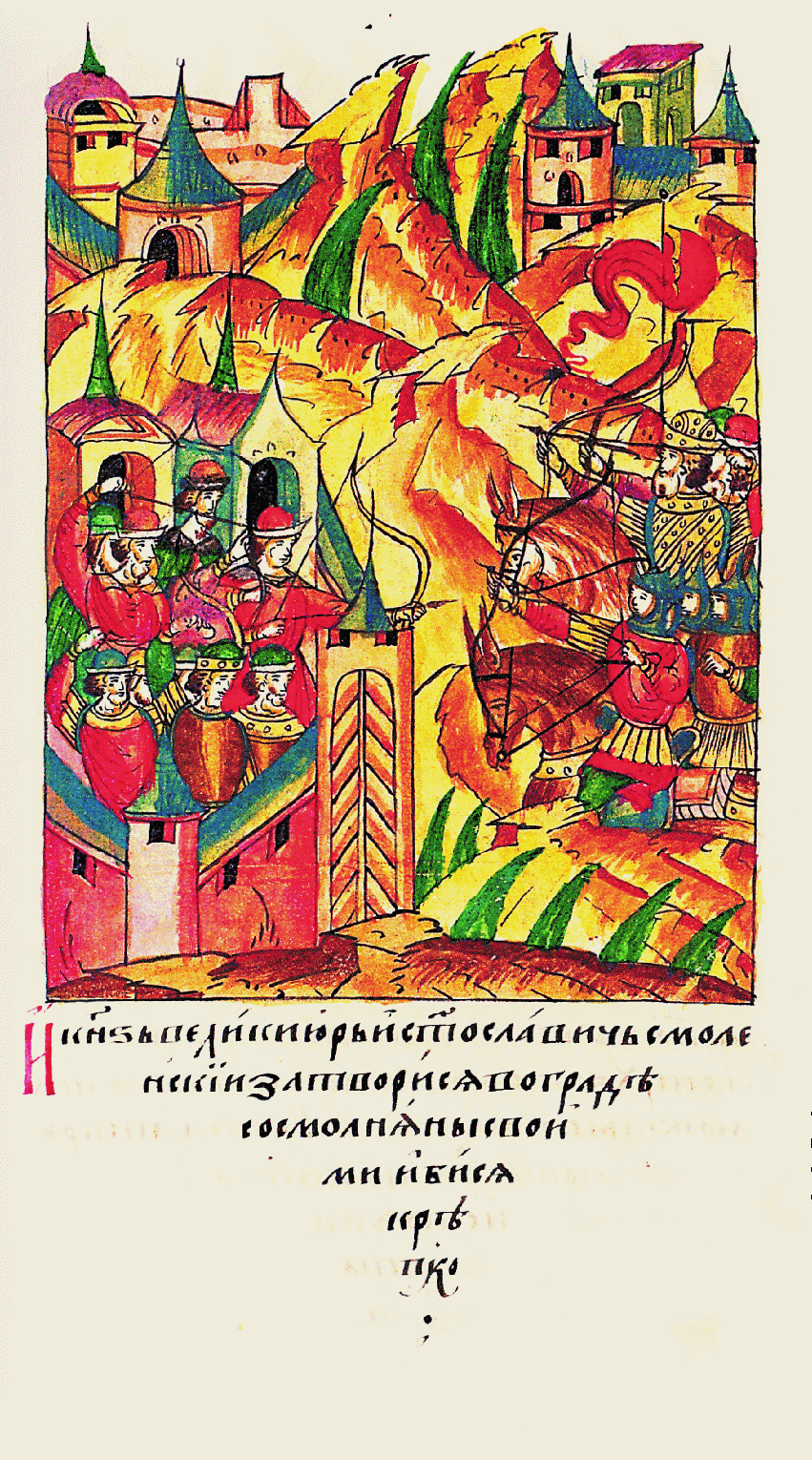
Prince George defending Smolensk from Vytautas, miniature from the Illustrated Chronicle of Ivan the Terrible (16th century)

Yury Svyatoslavich (Russian: Юрий Святославович) or Georgy Svyatoslavovich (Russian: Георгий Святославович; died 1407) was the prince of Smolensk and Bryansk (1386–1395; 1401–1404) whose life was spent in vain attempts to fend off aggression by the Grand Duchy of Lithuania.

== Reign ==
In 1386, a war broke out between Algirdas' sons, Skirgaila and Andrei of Polotsk. The latter fled from Polotsk to Smolensk and asked Yury's father for help. The armies of Smolensk and Skirgaila clashed near Mstsislaw in the Battle of the Vikhra River. After Yury's father was killed in battle and his brothers were taken prisoner, the Lithuanians approached Smolensk and allowed Yury to assume the throne on certain conditions, after exacting a sizable indemnity from him.

In 1395, while Yury was visiting his father-in-law, Oleg II of Ryazan, Grand Duke of Lithuania Vytautas the Great took Smolensk and installed his governor there. Four years later, Vytautas was routed by the Tatars in the Battle of the Vorskla River. In 1401, Yury and Oleg made use of his plight to retake Smolensk and Bryansk, where the pro-Lithuanian boyars were promptly executed.

In fall 1401, Vytautas laid siege to Smolensk but was forced to retreat after signing an armistice. Two years later, Smolensk withstood a two-week siege by Vytautas. Solicitous to preclude a new attack, Yury went to the Grand Duchy of Moscow to ask Vasily I of Moscow for help against Vytautas (who was Vasily's father-in-law). Although Yury promised to bequeath his possessions to Vasily, the Muscovite ruler hesitated to accept this proposal, until the boyars of Smolensk opened the city gates to Vytautas and surrendered Yury's capital to his old enemy in 1404. Thus Smolensk was lost to Russians for more than a century.

As Vasily was eager to accuse Yury of shortsightedness, the latter left Moscow and proceeded with his son to Novgorod, where he was treated honourably and was given an appanage of thirteen towns, including Porkhov and Tiversk. In 1406, he returned to Moscow, reconciled himself with Vasily and was sent to govern Torzhok in his name. While there, he attempted to seduce the wife of his cousin, Prince Semyon of Vyazma. When she refused his advances, Yury killed her and her husband and, afraid of the imminent punishment, fled to the Golden Horde, where he died soon thereafter, in 1407.

== Family ==
Yury had two daughters: Anastasia, wife of Grand Duke Švitrigaila of Lithuania, and Elena, wife of Yury of Zvenigorod (and mother of the famous Dmitry Shemyaka). He also had a son (Fyodor) who joined the Order of Saint John of Jerusalem in 1412.
