= Vytautas the Great =

Grand Duke of Lithuania, 1401–1430

- Duke of Trakai
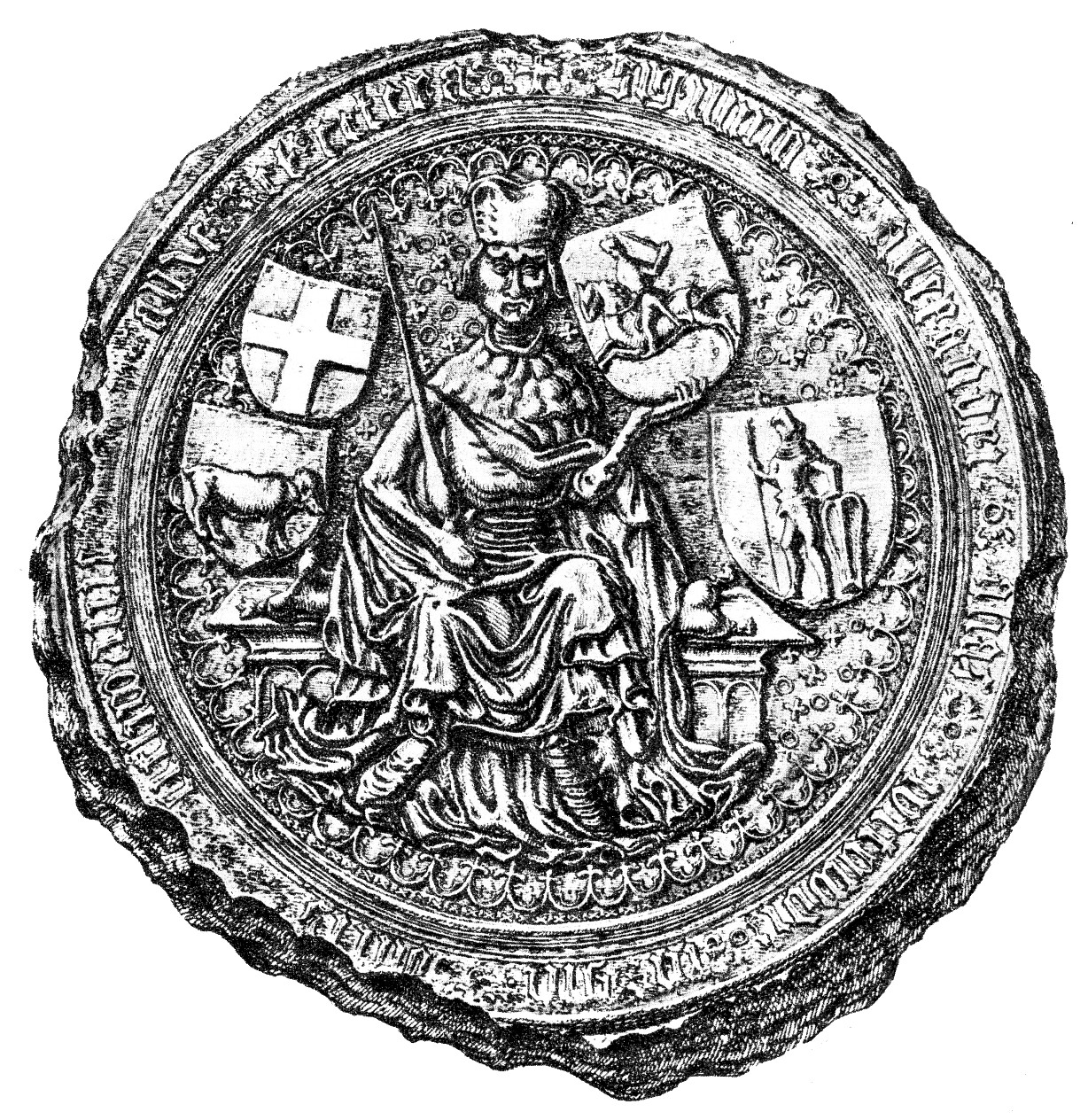
- Seal of Vytautas, depicting him with Cap of Gediminas

Grand Duke of Lithuania
- Reign: 1401 (Note: Vytautas styled himself "Grand Duke" since 1395 but he was not recognized as such by Jogaila, to whom he was formally subjected, until the Pact of Vilnius and Radom in 1401, when he was declared Jogaila's legal co-ruler.) – 27 October 1430
- Predecessor: Jogaila
- Successor: Jogaila and Švitrigaila
- Co-ruler: Jogaila

Regent of Lithuania
- Regency: 4 August 1392 – 1401
- Predecessor: Skirgaila
- Grand Duke: Jogaila
- Born: c. 1350; Senieji Trakai, Grand Duchy of Lithuania
- Died: 27 October 1430 (aged 79–80); Trakai, Grand Duchy of Lithuania
- Burial: Vilnius Cathedral, Vilnius
- Spouse: Anna; Uliana
- Issue: Sophia
- House: Kęstutis
- Father: Kęstutis
- Mother: Birutė
- Religion: Lithuanian polytheism (1350–1383); Roman Catholicism (1383–c. 1384, 1386–1430); Orthodox Christianity (c. 1384–1386)

Vytautas the Great (/vɪˈtaʊtəs/; also known as Alexander (Note: Lithuanian: Vytautas Didysis; Belarusian: Вітаўт, romanized: Vitaŭt; Samogitian: Vītauts Dėdlīsis; Polish: Witold Kiejstutowicz, Witold Aleksander or Witold Wielki; Ukrainian: Вітовт, romanized: Vitovt; Ruthenian: Витовт, Vitovt; Latin: Alexander Vitoldus; Old German: Wythaws or Wythawt; French: Vitold le Grand) c. 1350 – 27 October 1430) was a ruler of the Grand Duchy of Lithuania, first as regent for his cousin Jogaila (1392–1401) and then as the Grand Duke alongside him (1401–1430). He was also the prince of Grodno (1370–1382) and the prince of Lutsk (1387–1389), as well as claimant to the titles of King of the Hussites and King of Lithuania.

In modern Lithuania, Vytautas was an important figure in the national rebirth in the 19th century and is revered as a national hero. Vytautas is a popular male given name in Lithuania. In commemoration of the 500-year anniversary of his death, Vytautas Magnus University was named after him. Monuments in his honour were built in many towns in independent Lithuania during the interwar period from 1918 to 1939. Vytautas knew and spoke the Lithuanian language with his cousin Jogaila.

== Struggle for power ==
=== 1377–1384 ===
Vytautas' uncle Algirdas had been Grand Duke of Lithuania until his death in 1377. Algirdas and Vytautas' father Kęstutis had ruled jointly, with Algirdas governing the east and Kęstutis the west, primarily responsible for defense against the Teutonic Order. Algirdas was succeeded by his son Jogaila, and a struggle for power ensued. In 1380, Jogaila signed the secret Treaty of Dovydiškės with the Teutonic Order against Kęstutis. When Kęstutis discovered this in 1381, he seized Vilnius, imprisoned Jogaila, and made himself Grand Duke. However, Jogaila escaped and raised an army against Kęstutis. The two sides confronted each other but never engaged in battle. Kęstutis was ready to negotiate, but he and Vytautas were arrested and transported to Kreva Castle. One week later, Kęstutis was found dead. Whether he died of natural causes or was murdered is still a matter of debate.

In 1382, Vytautas escaped from Kreva and he sought help from the Teutonic Order, who were negotiating with Jogaila at the time. Jogaila and the Order agreed to the Treaty of Dubysa, by which Jogaila promised to accept Christianity, become an ally of the Order, and give the Order part of Samogitia up to the Dubysa River. However, the treaty was never ratified and in summer 1383, the war between Jogaila and the Order resumed. Vytautas was baptised as a Catholic, receiving the name of Wigand (Lithuanian: Vygandas). Vytautas participated in several raids against Jogaila. In January 1384, Vytautas promised to cede part of Samogitia to the Teutonic Order, up to the Nevėžis River, in return for recognition as Grand Duke of Lithuania. However, in July of the same year, Vytautas broke with the Order and reconciled with Jogaila. He then burned three important Teutonic castles, and regained all Kęstutis' lands, except for Trakai.

=== 1385–1392 ===
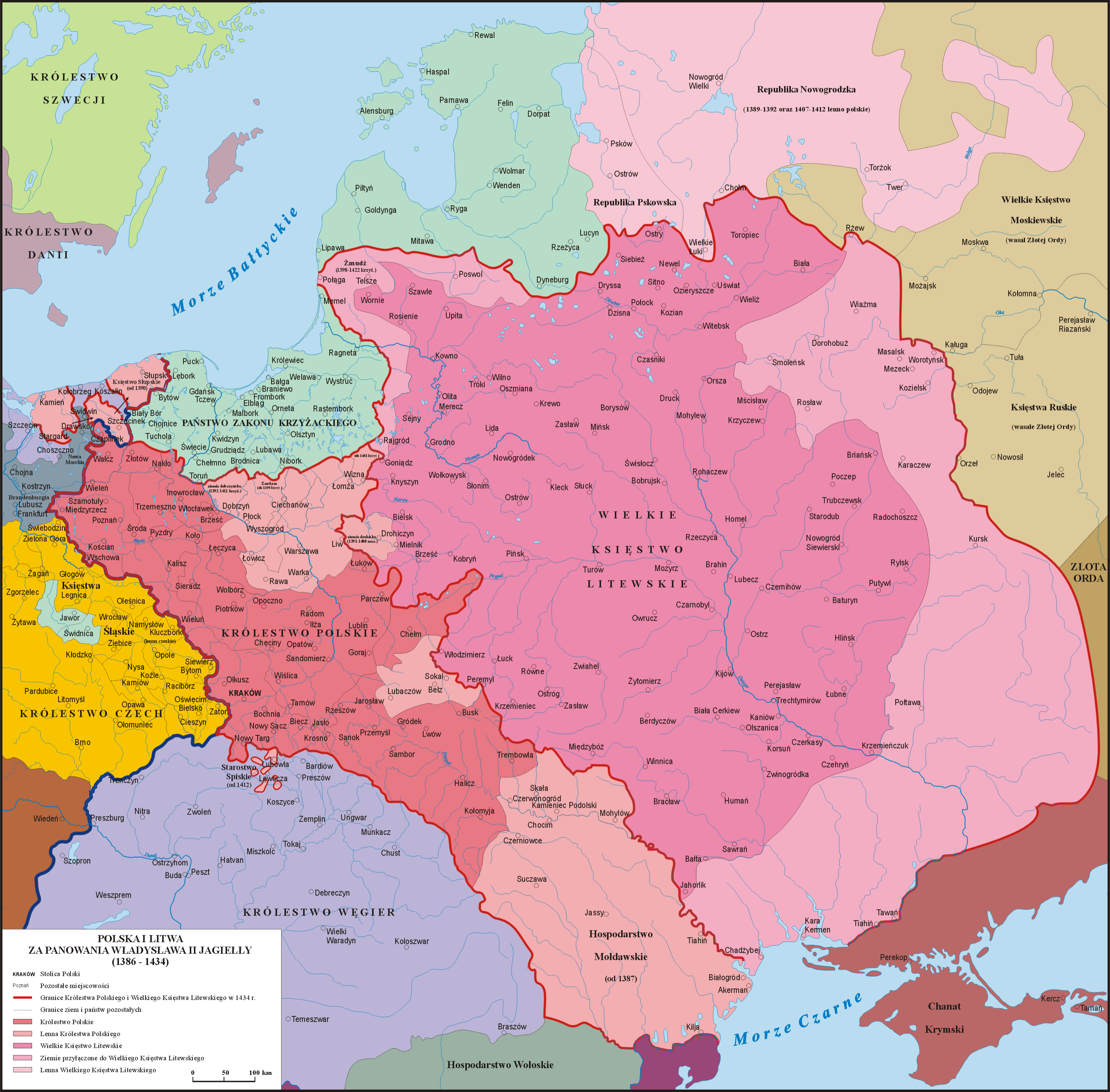
Poland and Lithuania, 1386–1434

In 1385, Jogaila concluded the Union of Krewo with Poland, under which he married Jadwiga of Poland and became King of Poland as Władysław II Jagiełło. Vytautas - who had converted to Orthodox christianity in 1384 or 1385 - participated in the Union and in 1386 was rebaptised as a Catholic. In 1386, Vytautas paid homage to Jogaila after his coronation as king of Poland.

Jogaila left his brother Skirgaila as regent in Lithuania. However, Skirgaila was unpopular with the people, and Vytautas saw an opportunity to become Grand Duke. In 1389, he attacked Vilnius but failed. In early 1390, Vytautas again allied with the Teutonic Order through the Treaty of Königsberg (1390). Vytautas had to confirm his agreement of 1384, and cede Samogitia to the Order. His army now invaded Lithuania. Also, to gain more influence, Vytautas married his only daughter Sophia to Vasili I of Moscow in 1391.

The Polish nobles were unhappy that their new king spent too much time on Lithuanian affairs. It was clear that the war could continue for years and would not benefit Poland. In 1392, Jogaila sent Henry of Masovia with an offer to make Vytautas regent instead of Skirgaila. Vytautas accepted and again broke with the Order. He burned three Teutonic castles and returned to Vilnius. Jogaila and Vytautas signed the Astrava Treaty in which Vytautas recovered all Kęstutis' lands, including Trakai, and was given more. It was agreed that Vytautas would rule Lithuania only in the name of Jogaila, however he de facto acquired all power of the Grand Duke. In 1401 he was eventually recognized as formal Grand Duke for his remaining life-time per Vilnius-Radom agreement, with the reservation that Jogaila remains the Supreme Duke, and after Vytautas's death all his lands and powers would revert to Jogaila and his descendants.

== Rule over Lithuania ==
=== Policy towards the East ===
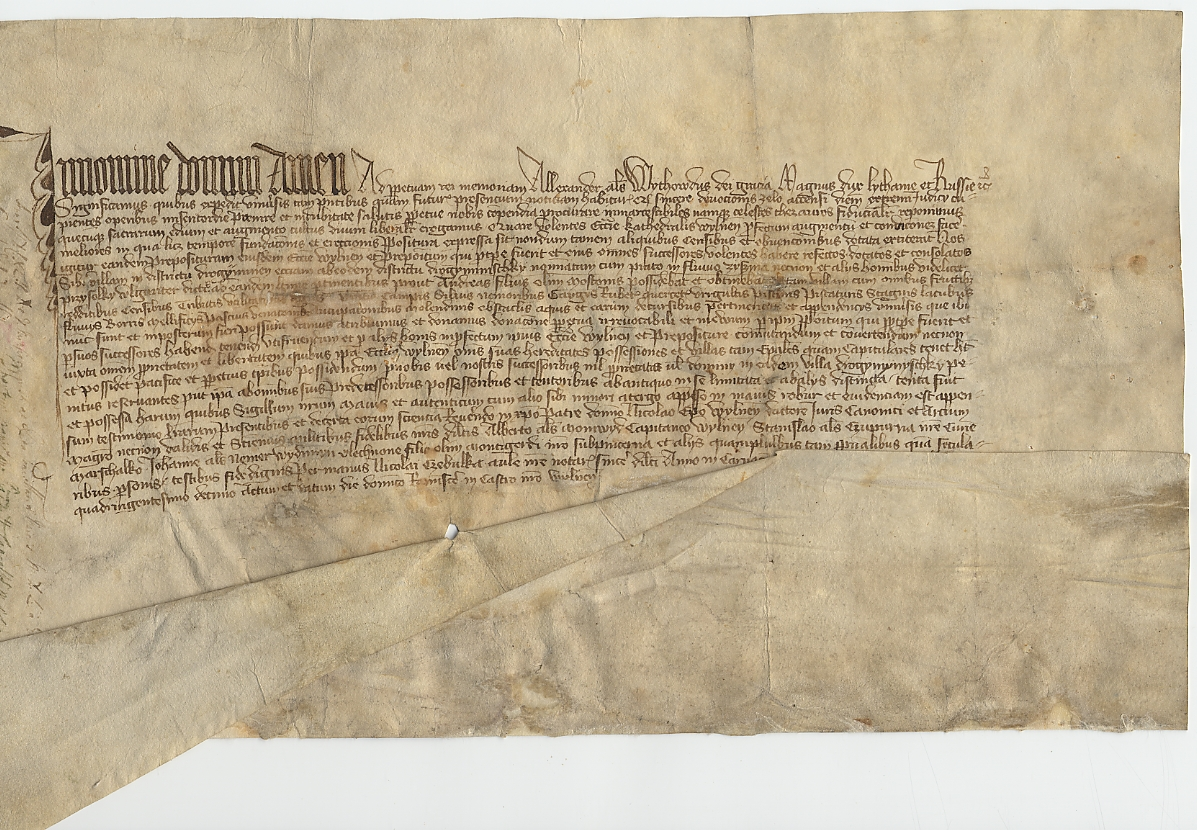
Privilege to Vilnius Cathedral issued by Vytautas in Vilnius on 16 February 1410 (Latin language)

Vytautas continued Algirdas' vision to control as many Ruthenian lands as possible. Much of the territory was already under the Grand Duke's rule, but the rest was controlled by the Mongols. Tokhtamysh, Khan of the Golden Horde, sought help from Vytautas when he was removed from the throne in 1395 after his defeat by Timur. An agreement was reached that Vytautas would help Tokhtamysh to regain power, and the Horde would cede more lands to the Grand Duchy of Lithuania in return. In 1398, Vytautas' army attacked a part of the Crimea and built a castle there. Now Lithuania spanned from the Baltic Sea to the Black Sea. A number of Tatar captives were brought to ethnic Lithuania.

Continuing attempts on the part of Poland to subordinate Lithuania drove Vytautas for the third time into the arms of the Order, and by the Treaty of Salynas in October 1398, Vytautas, who now styled himself Supremus Dux Lithuaniae, ceded his ancestral province of Samogitia to the knights, formed an alliance with them for the conquest and partition of Pskov and Novgorod the Great.

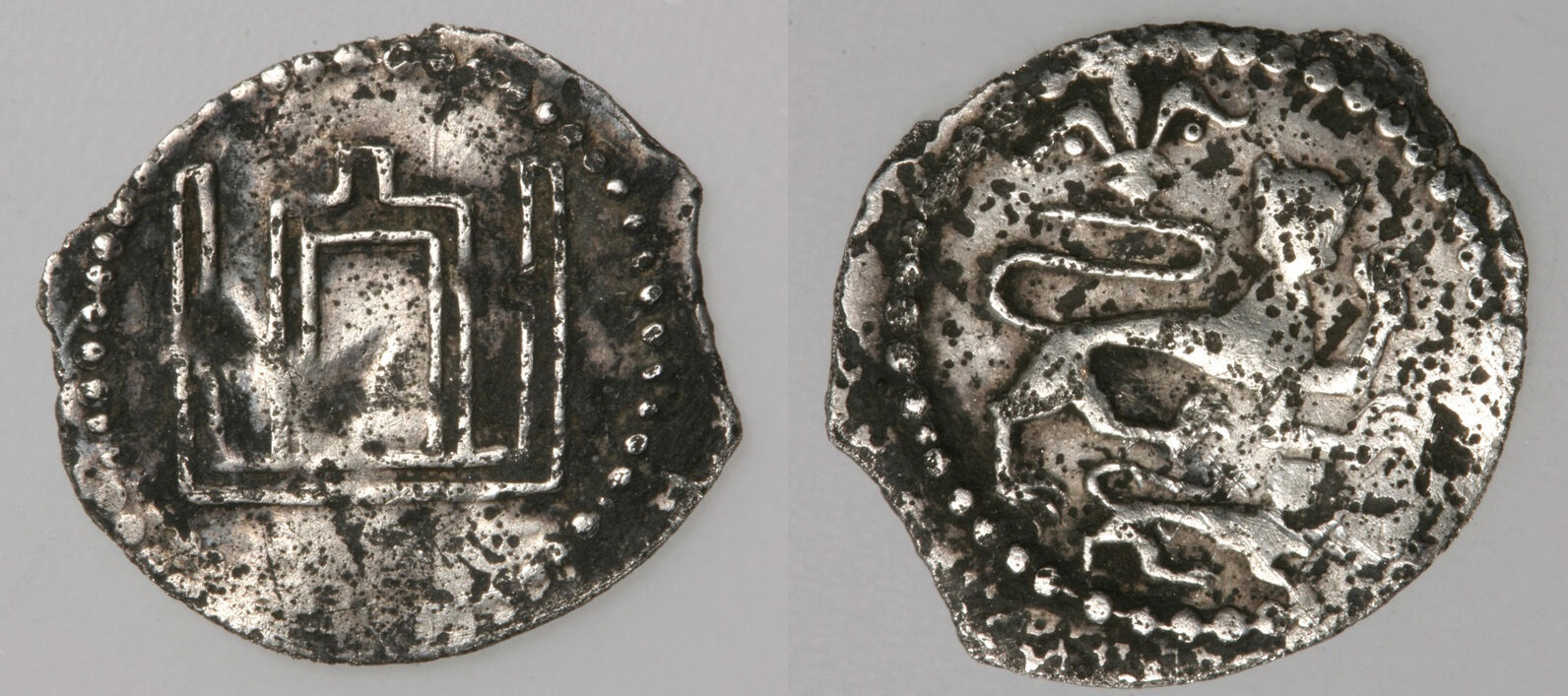
Principality of Smolensk coin with lions or leopards and the Columns of Gediminas, showing it as a vassal of Vytautas the Great, circa 1399–1401.

Inspired by his successful campaign against Timur, Vytautas and Jogaila won support from Pope Boniface IX for organising a crusade against the Mongols. This political move also demonstrated that Lithuania had fully accepted Christianity and was defending the faith on its own, and that the Teutonic Knights had no further basis for attacks against Lithuania. The campaign resulted in a crushing defeat at the Battle of the Vorskla River in 1399. Over twenty princes, including two brothers of Jogaila, were killed, and Vytautas himself barely escaped alive. This came as a shock to the Grand Duchy of Lithuania and Poland. A number of territories revolted against Vytautas, and Smolensk was retaken by its hereditary ruler, George of Smolensk, and not re-conquered by Lithuanians until 1404. Vytautas waged a war in 1406–1408 against his son-in-law Vasili I of Moscow and Švitrigaila, a brother of Jogaila who with the support of the Teutonic Order had declared himself grand prince. A major stand-off between the two armies ended without a battle in the Treaty of Ugra, by which Velikiy Novgorod was granted to Jogaila's brother Lengvenis, and the important city of Pskov to Jogaila's envoy Jerzy Nos, the latter settlement a clear violation of the treaty of Raciąż. The war with Muscovy ended in December 1408, on terms that made further conflict with the Teutonic Order inevitable, despite Hermann II of Celje's attempt to negotiate a solution.

=== Wars against the Teutonic Order ===
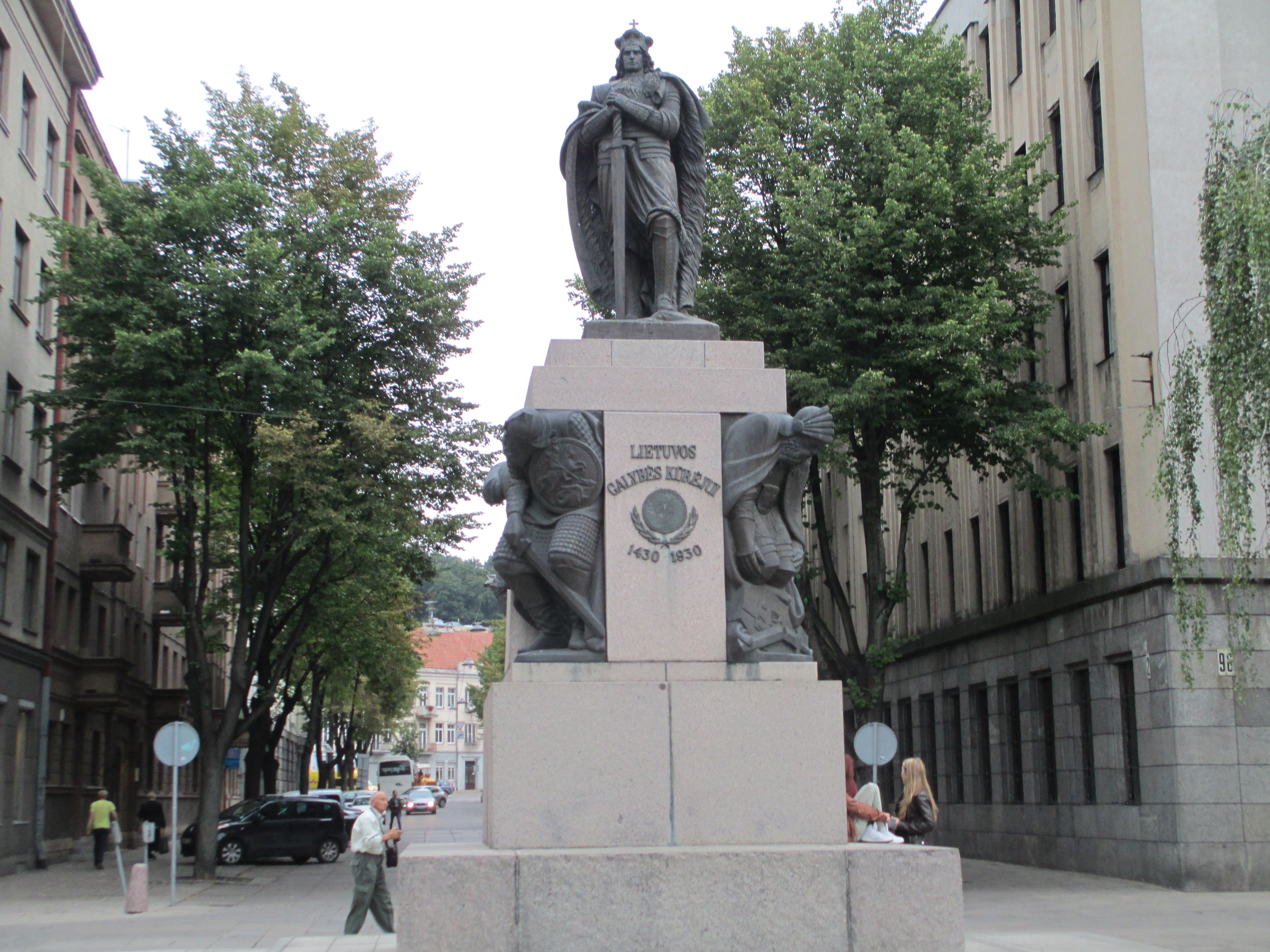
Statue of Vytautas the Great in Kaunas

"We do not know on whose merits or guilt such a decision was made, or with what we have offended Your Lordship so much that Your Lordship has deservedly been directed against us, creating hardship for us everywhere. First of all, you made and announced a decision about the land of Samogitia, which is our inheritance and our homeland from the legal succession of the ancestors and elders. We still own it, it is and has always been the same Lithuanian land, because there is one language and the same inhabitants. But since the land of Samogitia is located lower than the land of Lithuania, it is called as Samogitia, because in Lithuanian it is called lower land [ Žemaitija ]. And the Samogitians call Lithuania as Aukštaitija, that is, from the Samogitian point of view, a higher land. Also, the people of Samogitia have long called themselves as Lithuanians and never as Samogitians, and because of such identity (sic) we do not write about Samogitia in our letter, because everything is one: one country and the same inhabitants."

— Vytautas the Great, excerpt from his 11 March 1420 Latin letter sent to Sigismund, Holy Roman Emperor, in which he described the core of the Grand Duchy of Lithuania, composed from Žemaitija (lowlands) and Aukštaitija (highlands). Term Aukštaitija is known since the 13th century.

In the Treaty of Salynas Vytautas had transferred Samogitia to the Teutonic Knights. Samogitia was especially important for the Order because it separated the Teutonic Knights, based in Prussia, from the Livonian Order, based in Latvia. The two orders desired to unite and form a mighty force. However, the knights ruled Samogitia for only three years, because on 13 March 1401, the Samogitians, supported by Vytautas, rebelled and burned two castles. The knights received support from Švitrigaila, brother of Jogaila, who desired to take Vytautas' title. In 1404 Peace of Raciąż was signed, which in essence repeated the Treaty of Salynas: Samogitia was transferred to the Teutonic Knights. Poland promised not to support Lithuania in case of another war. The knights promised to support Vytautas in the east and not to support any Gediminid who could have claims to the title of Grand Duke of Lithuania. However, the treaty did not solve the problems, and all the parties prepared for war.

In 1408, Vytautas reached peace in the east and returned to Samogitian matters. In 1409 the second Samogitian uprising against the Teutonic Knights began, as the rebels burned Skirsnemunė castle. Both Poland and Lithuania supported the rebels. Vytautas gathered a large army from 18 lands under his control. The army joined Polish forces and advanced towards the Teutonic headquarters at the castle of Marienburg (present-day Malbork). In 1410, Vytautas himself commanded the forces of the Grand Duchy in the Battle of Grunwald. The battle ended in a decisive Polish-Lithuanian victory. Even though the siege of Marienburg was unsuccessful, the Teutonic Knights never regained their strength and from then on posed a reduced threat to Poland-Lithuania. From now on, Poland-Lithuania began to be regarded in the west as a great power, and Vytautas stood in high favour with the Roman curia.

As a result of the Peace of Thorn of 1411, Vytautas received Samogitia for his lifetime. However, the parties could not agree on the border. Sigismund, Holy Roman Emperor, agreed to mediate the dispute. In 1413, it was declared that the whole right bank of the Nemunas (Neman River) was Samogitia and therefore belonged to Lithuania. The Teutonic Knights disagreed and a new war started in 1414. The war lasted for just a few months, and the dispute was brought to the Council of Constance. Even though the dispute was not resolved, the Samogitians had a chance to present their case to the leaders of Europe. It is seen as an important event in the diplomatic history of Lithuania. Several other mediation attempts failed, and yet another war with the Teutonic Order started in 1422. After several months of fighting, the Treaty of Lake Melno was signed. Samogitia was returned to Lithuania in perpetuity, while the city of Memel (present-day Klaipėda) and surrounding territories stayed with the Order. This border, as established by the treaty, remained stable for some 500 years until the Memel Territory dispute of 1923. With peace established, Vytautas could now concentrate on reforms and the relationship with Poland.

=== Relationship with Poland ===
In 1399 Jadwiga of Poland and her newborn died in childbirth. Jogaila's power in Poland was jeopardised as he was a foreigner king with no other ties to the throne but his wife. Also, the defeat at Vorskla forced a re-evaluation of the relationship between Poland and Lithuania. The result was the Union of Vilnius and Radom in 1401. Vytautas was granted wide autonomy, but after his death the title and powers of Grand Duke of Lithuania were to be transferred to the king of Poland. In case Jagiełło died first without an heir, the Polish nobility agreed not to elect a new king without consulting Vytautas. The unique feature of this union was that the Lithuanian nobility presented their own document: for the first time somebody other than dukes played a role in the state matters.

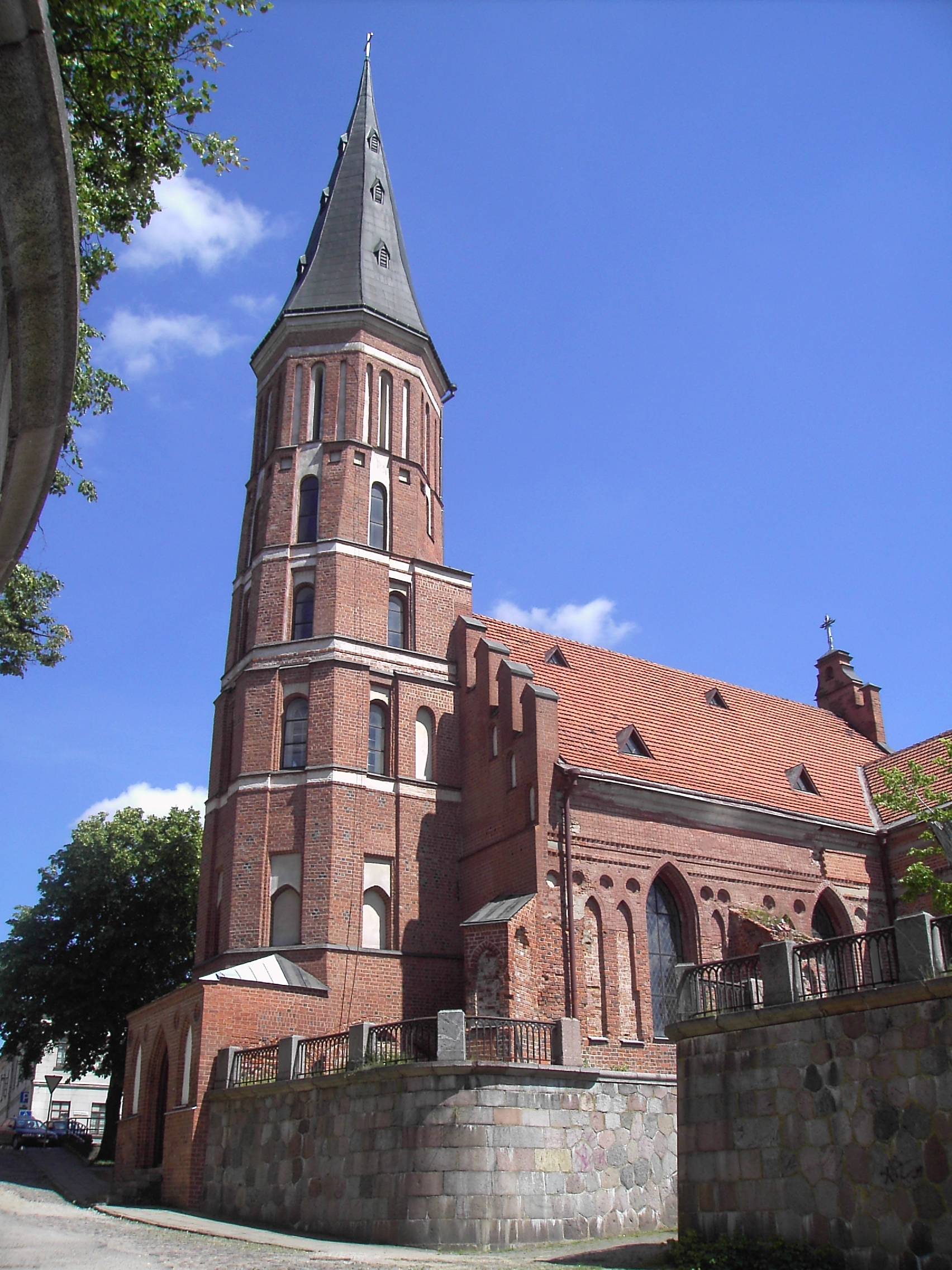
Church of Vytautas the Great. Built around 1400 in Kaunas

Vytautas was one of the creators of the Union of Horodło with Poland in 1413. According to the act of the union, the Grand Duchy of Lithuania was to retain a separate Grand Duke and its own parliament. At the same time both the Polish and Lithuanian Sejms were to discuss all the important matters jointly. This union was important culturally as well as politically because it granted Lithuanian Christian nobles the same rights as the Polish szlachta. This act did not include Orthodox nobles. This paved the way for more contacts and cooperation between the nobles of Poland and of Lithuania.

In January 1429, at the Congress of Lutsk it was proposed by Sigismund, king of Hungary, that Vytautas should be crowned King of Lithuania. It resulted in a great crisis between Vytautas, king Władysław and Polish nobles. The envoys who were transporting documents supporting Vytautas's coronation and proposing an alliance between Lithuania, Hungary and the Teutonic Order were stopped at the Polish-Lithuanian border in the autumn of 1430. Vytautas died in the Trakai Island Castle, ending the whole affair. He was buried in the Cathedral of Vilnius. The knowledge about his remains has been lost.

According to the Encyclopædia Britannica Eleventh Edition, Vytautas "was certainly the most imposing personality of his day in Eastern Europe, and his martial valour was combined with statesmanlike foresight."

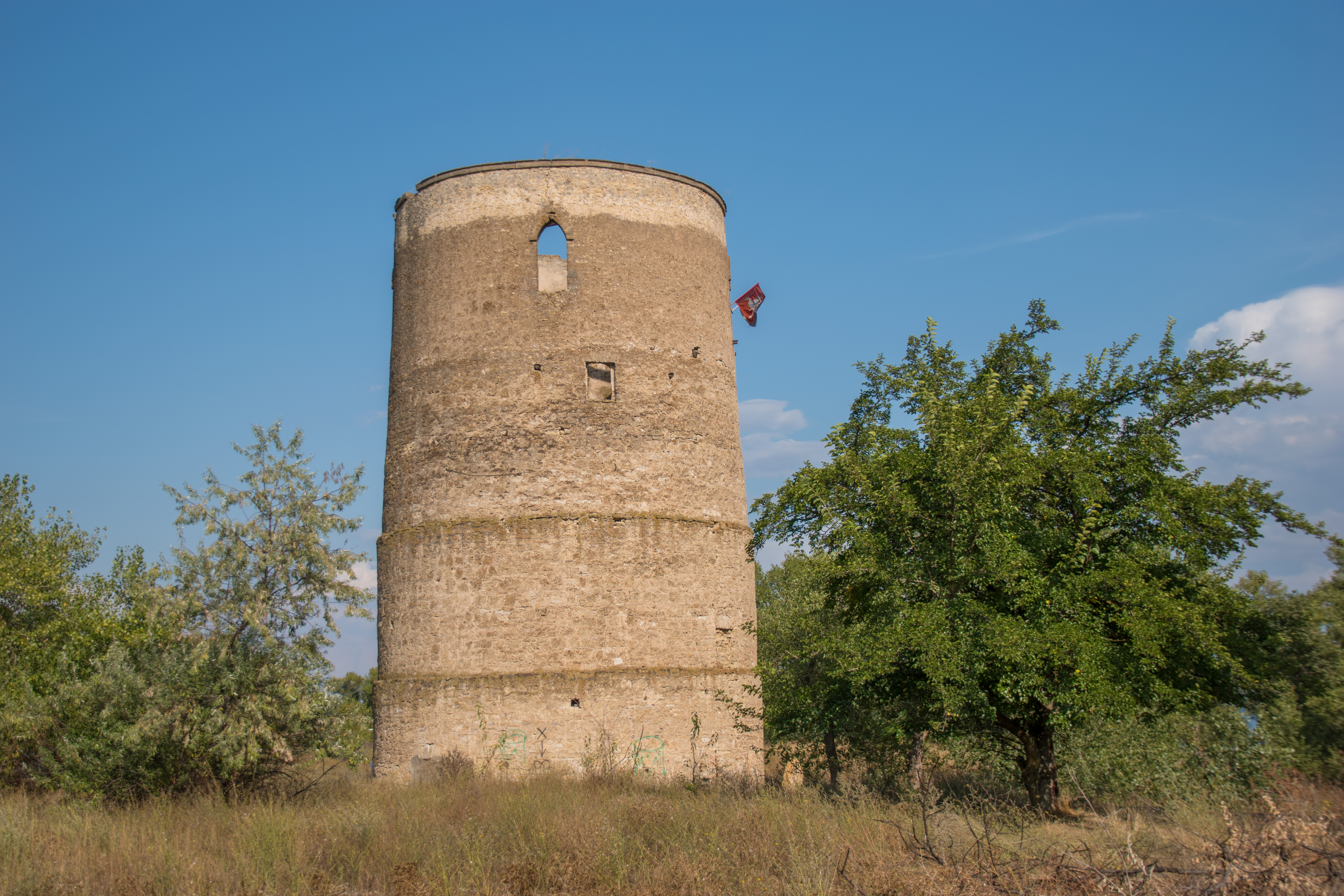
Vytautas the Great watch tower in Kherson Oblast, Ukraine

=== Reforms ===
Vytautas backed the economic development of his state and introduced many reforms. Under his rule the Grand Duchy of Lithuania gradually became more centralised, as local princes with dynastic ties to the throne were replaced by the governors loyal to Vytautas. The governors were rich landowners who formed the basis for the Lithuanian nobility. During Vytautas' rule, the influential Radvila (Radziwiłł) and Goštautas families began their rise.

In 1398, Vytautas brought over families of the Karaim (388 families) and Tatar peoples. Their principal role was to guard the castle and the bridges, but they also served as translators, farmers, traders, and diplomats. He retains a very high reputation among them, with the anniversary of his death being officially celebrated in 1930 in the kenesa in Vilnius.

== Family ==
Born in 1350 in the castle of present-day Old Trakai (Senieji Trakai), Vytautas was the son of Kęstutis and his wife Birutė. Vytautas was a cousin and childhood friend of Jogaila (Władysław II Jagiełło), who became King of Poland in 1386. Around 1370, he married Anna, who gave birth to Sophia of Lithuania. Sophia was married to Vasily I, Grand Prince of Moscow, and mother and regent to their son Vasili II. After Anna's death in 1418, Vytautas married her niece Juliana Olshanska, daughter of Ivan Olshanski who outlived him. Because of the relationship between the two women, the Bishop of Vilnius was unwilling to perform the ceremony without a papal dispensation; however, Jan Kropidło did not have such scruples and married them on 13 November 1418. According to the 16th century Bychowiec Chronicle, his first wife was Maria Łukomska, however, this is not confirmed by other sources.

== Depictions ==
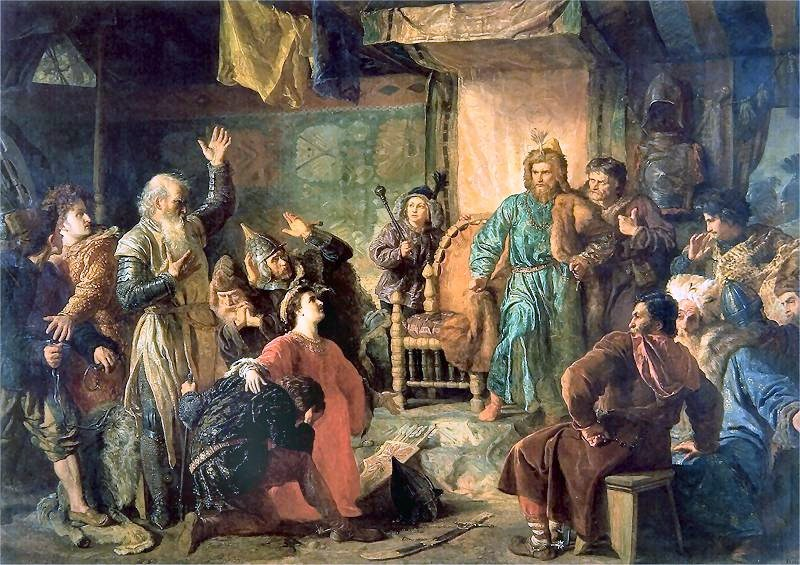
Vytautas and Kęstutis imprisoned by Jogaila. Painting by Wojciech Gerson

A sculpture for Vytautas is display on the Millennium of Russia monument in Veliky Novgorod.

Vytautas appears in several works of fiction dealing with the Polish-Lithuanian conflict with the Teutonic Order. He appears in the narrative poem Konrad Wallenrod by Adam Mickiewicz. He was portrayed by Józef Kostecki in Knights of the Teutonic Order, the 1960 adaptation of the famous novel by Henryk Sienkiewicz.

In 2014, a short animation was produced by "Four Directions of Fairy Tales" (Cztery Strony Bajek) in association with the Association of Polish Karaims, portraying the Karaim story of Vytautas and his magic horse, with voiceovers in several languages, including Karaim, Polish, English, and Lithuanian.

In the video game Age of Empires II: Definitive Edition, Vytautas featured as a cavalry hero.

Vytautas is also mentioned in Jonathan Franzen's fictitious novel "The Corrections", which attributes his death in 1430 to Lithuania's gradual downfall as a "global player".

== See also ==
- Gediminids
- House of Kęstutis – family tree of Vytautas
- Order of Vytautas the Great

== Bibliography ==
- (in Lithuanian) Inga Deidulė, Vytauto Didžiojo įvaizdžio genezės mįslė, – "ieškokite moterų", Vartiklis. Accessed 20 May 2006.
- (in Lithuanian) Andrius Mingėla, Vytautas Lietuvos didysis kunigaikštis, Juventa high school. Accessed 20 May 2006.
- Oscar Halecki, Borderlands of Western Civilization: A History of East Central Europe, 2nd edition, Chapter 8, Simon Publications, July 2001, ISBN 0-9665734-8-X
- Vytautas and Karaims, Lithuanian Karaims Culture Community. Accessed 20 May 2006.
- (in Polish) Baczkowski, Krzysztof (1999). Wielka historia Polski. Tom 3: Dzieje Polski późnośredniowiecznej (1370 - 1506). Grupa Wydawnicza Bertelsmann Media. p. 79. ISBN 978-83-7311-075-5
- (in Polish) Borkowska, Urszula (2012). ''Dynastia Jagiellonów w Polsce''. PWN. ISBN 978-83-01-16692-2

Vytautas the Great Gediminid dynasty Born: c. 1350 Died: 27 October 1430
Preceded by Jogaila	Grand Duke of Lithuania with Jogaila as Supreme Duke; 1401–1430	Succeeded by Jogaila and Švitrigaila
Preceded by Skirgaila	Viceroy of Lithuania as regent for Jogaila; 1392–1401	Succeeded by himself and Jogaila (as co-ruling Grand Dukes)
Preceded by Skirgaila	Duke of Trakai; 1392–1413	Succeeded by Duchy transformed into voivodeship
Preceded by Title created	Grand Duke of Ruthenia; 1398–1430	Succeeded by Švitrigaila
