= Battle of the Vorskla River =

1399 battle in present-day Ukraine

Coordinates: 48°54′15″N 34°7′18″E

- Part of Golden Horde-Lithuania armed conflict
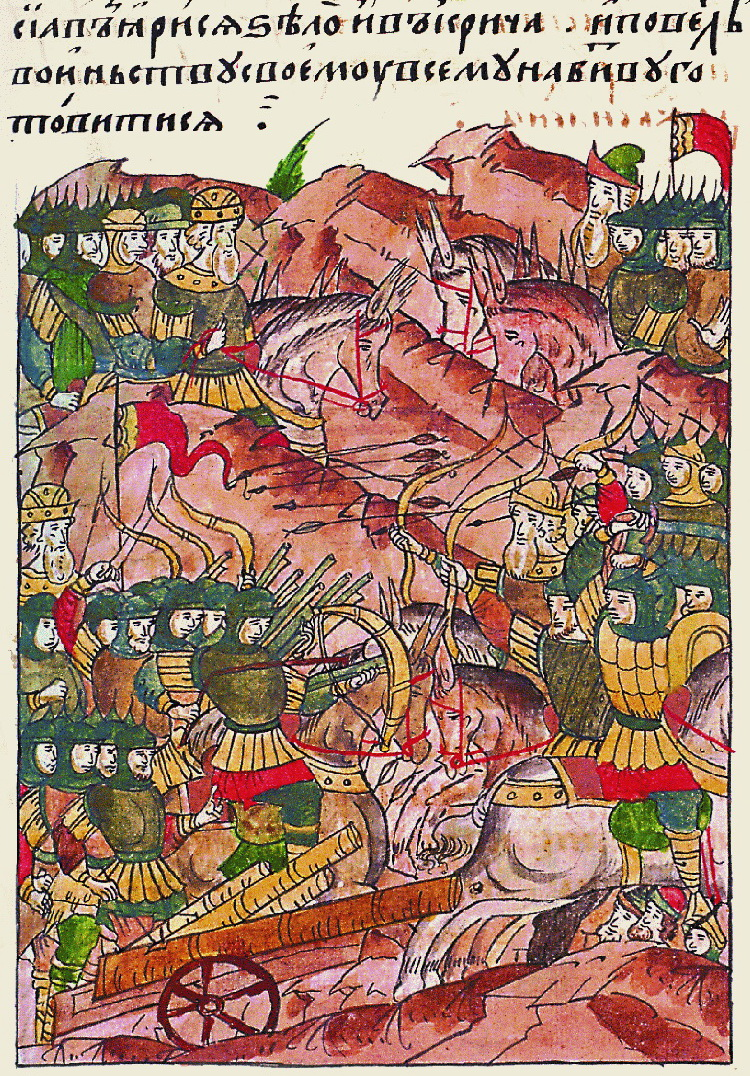
- A miniature from the Personal annalistic code
| Date | August 12, 1399 |
| Location | Vorskla River (modern Ukraine) |
| Result | Golden Horde victory |
| Territorial changes | Lithuania loses the Black Sea coast and southern part of the Wild Fields to the Tatars; Smolensk, Novgorod, and Pskov rebel against Lithuania |

Belligerents
| Golden Horde | Grand Duchy of Lithuania; Kingdom of Poland; Principality of Kiev; Principality of Polotsk; Principality of Smolensk; Principality of Bryansk; Moldavia; Wallachia; Teutonic Order; Forces of Tokhtamysh |

Commanders and leaders
| Edigu; Temür Qutlugh | Grand Duke Vytautas; Tokhtamysh; Ivan Borisovich †; Andrey of Polotsk †; Demetrius I Starshy †; Gleb Svyatoslavich †; Spytko II of Melsztyn †; Hanus †; Thomas Surville † |

Strength
| 90,000 | 38,000 with 50 princes |

Casualties and losses
| Unknown | most of the army destroyed (including 11 Teutonic Knights, notably Thomas Surville and Hanus) |

The Battle of the Vorskla River was fought on August 12, 1399, between the Tatars of the Golden Horde, under Edigu and Temür Qutlugh, and the armies of Tokhtamysh and a large Crusader force led by Grand Duke Vytautas the Great of Lithuania. The battle ended in a decisive Tatar victory for the Golden Horde.

== Background ==
In late 1380s the relationship between Tokhtamysh, Khan of the Golden Horde, and his former master, Timur, was growing tense. In 1395, after losing the Tokhtamysh–Timur war, Tokhtamysh was dethroned by the party of Khan Temur Qutlugh and Emir Edigu, supported by Timur. Tokhtamysh escaped to the Grand Duchy of Lithuania and asked Vytautas for assistance in retaking the Horde in exchange for surrendering his suzerainty over Ruthenian lands. This development was in harmony with Vytautas' ambitions to become ruler of all Ruthenian lands. A surviving iarlyk shows that Tokhtamysh had asked for Polish–Lithuanian assistance previously in 1393.

== Vytautas' expeditions ==
Vytautas gathered a large army which included Lithuanians, Ruthenians, Poles, Moldavians, and Wallachians. To enlist support from the Teutonic Knights, Vytautas signed the Treaty of Salynas, surrendering Samogitia to the Knights. Vytautas's son-in-law, Vasily I of Moscow, formally a Tatar vassal, did not join the coalition. The joint forces organized three expeditions into Tatar territories, in 1397, 1398, and 1399. The first expedition reached the Black Sea and Crimea. Vytautas took several thousand captives without much opposition. Half of these captives were settled near Trakai and awarded privileges to practice their faith. Communities of their descendants, Lipka Tatars and Crimean Karaites (Karaims), survive to this day.

In 1398, the army of Vytautas moved from the Dnieper River and attacked northern Crimea, reaching as far east as the River Don. In order to strengthen his position, Vytautas built a castle at the mouth of Dnieper. Inspired by their successes, Vytautas declared a "Crusade against the Tatars" and in May 1399 received blessing from Pope Boniface IX. The papal blessing for the crusade was an important political achievement for Lithuania, a country converted to Christianity only in 1387 and the subject of a hundred-year crusade. The campaign was organized from Kiev. In 1399, the army of Vytautas once again moved against the Horde along the Dnieper River. On August 5, his army met the Tatars at the Vorskla River just north of Poltava (almost same location as the Battle of Poltava of 1709).

== Battle ==
Once the two armies met, Temur Qutlugh proposed a three-day ceasefire to allow both sides to prepare their forces. It was a trick to win time while Edigu's reinforcements arrived. Vytautas planned to build a great wagon-fort, to stop charging horsemen, and then to destroy them with cannons and artillery. Vytautas' army was well equipped, but smaller in number. However, Temur Qutlugh feigned a retreat (a tried and tested Tatar tactic) and Vytautas left his wagon fort to pursue him. Once Lithuanian forces were suitably far away from the wagon fort, the units of Edigu appeared from behind and surrounded the Lithuanian army. At this point Tokhtamysh decided the battle was lost and fled the battle with his men. The Tatars then used their own artillery to destroy the Lithuanian cavalry whilst simultaneously capturing the Lithuanians' wagon fort.

== Aftermath ==
Vytautas barely escaped alive, but many princes of his kin (including his cousins Demetrius I Starszy and Andrei of Polotsk) and allies (as for example, Stephen I of Moldavia and two of his brothers) died in the battle. It is estimated that some 50 princes fought under Vytautas' banners and about 20 of them were killed. The victorious Tatars besieged Kiev, but it paid a ransom. The Tatars pillaged as far west as Lutsk, in pursuit of Tokhtamysh, who spent the next seven or eight years in hiding and was assassinated in 1407 or 1408.

Vytautas' defeat at the Vorskla effectively blocked Lithuanian expansion to southern Ruthenia. His state also lost access to the Black Sea as the Tatars reconquered the southern steppe all the way to the borders of Moldavia; lands that were held by the Golden Horde until the Crimean Khanate broke away from its rule some forty-two years later. After the battle, Yury of Smolensk revolted against Lithuania and Smolensk was not recaptured for five years. Veliky Novgorod and Pskov also rebelled against Lithuanian rule, drawing Vytautas into a war with the Grand Principality of Moscow.

Vytautas was forced to abandon his plans to break the Union of Kreva and to ally himself once again with his cousin and King of Poland Jogaila. The Polish–Lithuanian union was reaffirmed in the Union of Vilnius and Radom. Vytautas also turned his plans from expansion southwards to east (against Moscow) and west (against the Teutonic Knights). It has been suggested that Vytautas learned the staged retreat tactic during the battle and successfully used it himself in the Battle of Grunwald (1410), an important defeat of the Teutonic Knights.

Moscow benefited most from the battle, as it defended itself from the Lithuanian threat. The Tatars saved Moscow from Lithuanian expansion, which allowed it to regain its strength and eventually act against the khanate itself. According to the Lithuanian historian Edvardas Gudavičius:

It is not only Vytautas’s hopes for triumph at the expense of the Russians and Tatars that collapsed. The peace with the Teutonic Order, for which the Samogitians had paid, was supposed to free Lithuania of the hegemony and suzerainty of Poland. Now, it was all in vain. Having successfully begun to strengthen the statehood and international position of Lithuania, Vytautas did not foresee all the dangers, lost his sense of reality, and, having taken an unjustified risk, lost terribly. His radical political course had to be changed, and other ways had to be found to achieve his goals.

== Sources ==
- Гумилев, Лев (2023). От Руси к России. Moscow: Москва. ISBN 978-5-17-153845-3.
