= Treaty of Königsberg (1384) =

1384 treaty between Lithuania and the Teutonic Knights

The Treaty of Königsberg was a treaty during Lithuanian Civil War (1381–1384) signed between Vytautas the Great and representatives of the Teutonic Knights. It was signed in Königsberg (now Kaliningrad) on 30 January 1384. Vytautas granted territory to the Teutonic Knights in return for their support in the civil war.

== Background ==
The Lithuanian Civil War of 1381–1384 was the first struggle for power between the cousins Jogaila, Grand Duke of Lithuania and later King of Poland, and Vytautas the Great. It began after Jogaila signed the Treaty of Dovydiškės with the Teutonic Knights which was aimed against his uncle Kęstutis, father of Vytautas. Kęstutis briefly seized power in the Grand Duchy, but was betrayed by adherents of Jogaila primarily from Vilnius. During negotiations for a truce Kęstutis and Vytautas were arrested and transported to the Kreva Castle. Kęstutis died there a week later but Vytautas managed to escape and then sought an alliance with the Teutonic Knights. Subsequently their joint forces raided Lithuanian lands. Eventually the cousins were reconciled as Jogaila needed internal stability in anticipation of negotiations with the Grand Duchy of Moscow and the Kingdom of Poland regarding the possible Christianization of Lithuania. The war did not settle the power struggle; it continued during the next Lithuanian Civil War (1389–1392) which was resolved by the signing of the Ostrów Agreement. After more than ten years of struggle, Vytautas finally became the Grand Duke of Lithuania and ruled the country for thirty-eight years.

== Treaty ==
In order to secure Teutonic support in the civil war, Vytautas signed the Treaty of Königsberg, granting Samogitia up to the Nevėžis River and Kaunas to the Teutonic Order. In 1382, Jogaila had promised the Knights Samogitia only up to the Dubysa River, but never ratified the Treaty of Dubysa. Samogitia was important for the Knights as this territory physically separated them from uniting with the Livonian Order to the north. Vytautas also promised to become the Order's vassal. In February 1384, several Samogitian regions acknowledged their support to Vytautas and the Knights.

On 16 July 1384, Vytautas re-confirmed the Treaty of Königsberg in New Marienverder, a new fortress built on the Neman River. However, the treaty was broken in July when Vytautas and Jogaila reconciled. Vytautas burned Teutonic castles and returned to Lithuania.

During the Lithuanian Civil War (1389–1392) Vytautas once again asked for military support from the Knights. On 19 January 1390, he signed the Treaty of Lyck, confirming the Treaty of Königsberg only to break it again in 1392. Vytautas granted Samogitia to the Knights twice more, first in the Treaty of Salynas (1398) and then in the Treaty of Raciąż (1404).

Lithuanian historian Danilevičius and Polish historian Koneczny raised doubts whether the treaty is original and not a Teutonic forgery.
