= Lithuanian Civil War (1381–1384) =

Military conflict

Lithuanian Civil War of 1381–1384
- Part of Vytautas–Jogaila power struggle
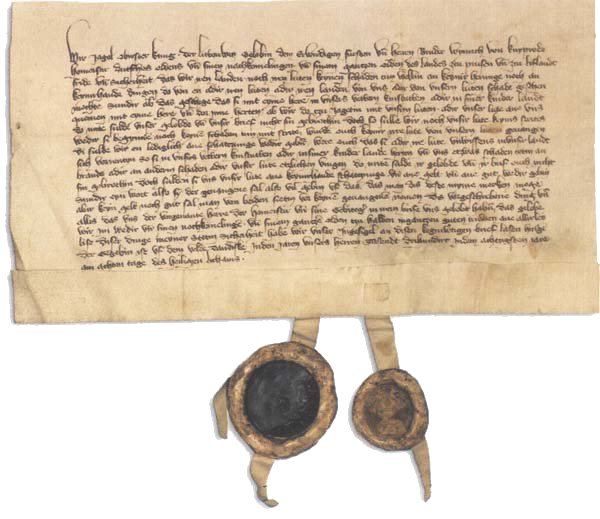
- The apparent cause of the civil war: Treaty of Dovydiškės
Date	August 1381 – July 1384
Location	Grand Duchy of Lithuania
Result	Temporary Vytautas and Jogaila reconciliation

Belligerents
Duchy of Samogitia Ally: Teutonic State	Grand Duchy of Lithuania

Commanders and leaders
Kęstutis; Vytautas (State of the Teutonic Order) Winrich von Kniprode (State of the Teutonic Order) Conrad Zöllner von Rothenstein	Jogaila; Skirgaila

The Lithuanian Civil War of 1381–1384 was the first struggle for power between the cousins Jogaila, Grand Duke of Lithuania and later King of Poland, and Vytautas the Great. It began after Jogaila signed the Treaty of Dovydiškės with the Teutonic Knights which was aimed against his uncle Kęstutis, father of Vytautas. Kęstutis briefly seized power in the Grand Duchy, but was betrayed by adherents of Jogaila primarily from Vilnius. During negotiations for a truce Kęstutis and Vytautas were arrested and transported to the Kreva Castle. Kęstutis died there a week later but Vytautas managed to escape and then sought an alliance with the Teutonic Knights. Subsequently their joint forces raided Lithuanian lands. Eventually the cousins were reconciled as Jogaila needed internal stability in anticipation of negotiations with the Grand Duchy of Moscow and the Kingdom of Poland regarding the possible Christianization of Lithuania. The war did not settle the power struggle; it continued during the next Lithuanian Civil War (1389–1392) which was resolved by the signing of the Ostrów Agreement. After more than ten years of struggle, Vytautas finally became the Grand Duke of Lithuania and ruled the country for thirty-eight years.

== Background ==
Brothers Algirdas and Kęstutis peacefully co-ruled the Grand Duchy of Lithuania. Algirdas, who was the Grand Duke, spent most of his time dealing with the eastern provinces of the Grand Duchy, inhabited by Ruthenians of Orthodox faith. Kęstutis in the name of Algirdas handled most of the affairs in the western part, including defense against the Teutonic Knights. Algirdas died in 1377 and left the throne to Jogaila, his eldest son from the second marriage with Uliana of Tver. Kęstutis and Vytautas continued to collaborate with Jogaila even when his right of inheritance was challenged by Andrei of Polotsk, Algirdas' eldest son from his first marriage with Maria of Vitebsk.

The Teutonic Knights continued their crusade against pagan Lithuania. A large campaign was organized in winter of 1378, during which the Teutons reached Brest and as far as the Pripyat River. The Livonian Order raided Upytė, and another campaign threatened the capital in Vilnius. In summer 1379, Jogaila's brother Skirgaila was sent to the Knights to discuss the situation, possible ways of converting to Christianity, and termination of the Livonian Order's support to Andrei. The details of the trip however remain unknown; rumors had it that he also visited the Holy Roman Emperor. While the purpose or the outcome of the trip are unclear, it was often cited as the first intrigue behind Kęstutis' back. In the meantime Kęstutis offered to negotiate a truce with the Knights and an exchange of prisoners. On September 29, 1379, a ten-year truce was signed in Trakai. It was the last treaty that Kęstutis and Jogaila signed jointly. It was followed by a three-day secret negotiations between Jogaila and the Knights in Vilnius. However, the truce protected only the Christian lands in the south, while Kęstutis' pagan realms in northern and western Lithuania were still vulnerable to Teutonic attacks.

In February 1380, Jogaila, without Kęstutis, made a five-month truce with the Livonian Order to protect his Lithuanian domains and cease Livonian support to Andrei of Polotsk. On May 31, 1380, Jogaila and Grand Master Winrich von Kniprode signed the secret Treaty of Dovydiškės. The clauses of the treaty were, overall, convoluted and not entirely clear. Based on the terms of the accord, Jogaila agreed not to intervene during attacks by the Teutonic Knights against Kęstutis or his children. However, if providing aid to Kęstutis were necessary to avoid any suspicions, it would not be a violation of the treaty. The treaty remains controversial as the motives behind it are not entirely clear. Some historians blame Uliana, mother of Jogaila, or his adviser Vaidila, others point out generational differences: Kęstutis was about 80 years old and determined not to accept Christianity, while Jogaila was about 30 and was looking for ways to convert and modernize the country. Still others have suggested that the treaty was primarily directed against Andrei and his allies – his brother Dmitry of Bryansk and Grand Duke of Moscow Dmitri Donskoi. Jogaila, having secured his western front, allied himself with the Golden Horde against the Grand Duchy of Moscow for the upcoming Battle of Kulikovo.

== Civil war ==
=== Kęstutis' coup and Jogaila's counter-coup ===
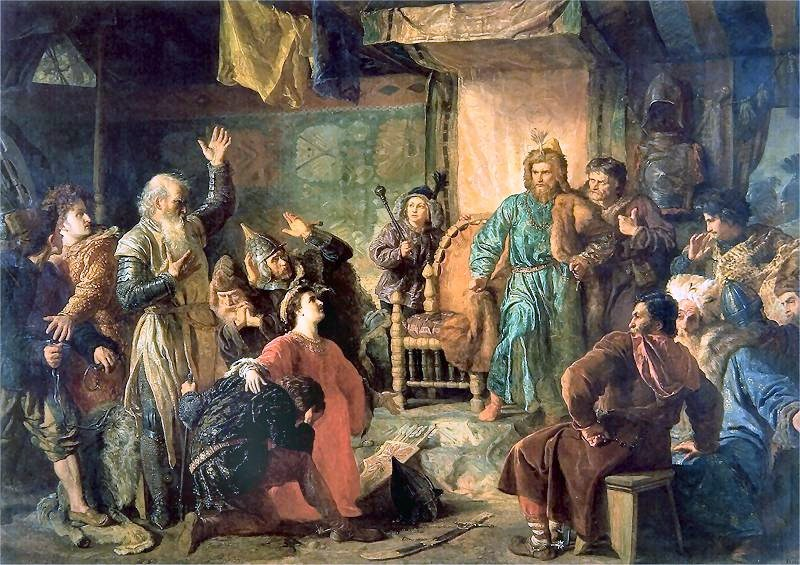
Vytautas and Kęstutis imprisoned by Jogaila. Painting by Wojciech Gerson

In early 1381, without violating the Treaty of Dovydiškės, the Teutonic Knights raided the Duchy of Trakai and Samogitia twice. While raiding towards Trakai, the Teutonic Knights used bombards for the first time and destroyed Naujapilis, taking some 3,000 prisoners. In August 1381, Kuno von Liebenstein, komtur of Osterode and godfather of Danutė of Lithuania, informed Kęstutis about the secret treaty. When Kęstutis asked Vytautas if he knew anything about it, he denied any knowledge and suspected a Teutonic trap. In fall 1381, Kęstutis took advantage of Polotsk's rebellion against Skirgaila. Jogaila was away to subdue the rebellion and his absence provided a good opportunity to capture Vilnius, the capital of the Grand Duchy. Kęstutis became the Grand Duke while Jogaila was taken prisoner on his way back to Vilnius. Vaidila was executed. Jogaila pledged his loyalty to Kęstutis, was released, and received his patrimony, Kreva and Vitebsk. Kęstutis then resumed war with the Teutonic Knights: his army raided Warmia and attempted to capture Georgenburg (Jurbarkas).

On June 12, 1382, while Kęstutis was away to fight Dymitr Korybut of Novhorod-Siversky, who refused to pay taxes, and Vytautas was away in Trakai, residents of Vilnius, led by the merchant Hanul of Riga, let Jogaila's army into the city. The merchants were dissatisfied with Kęstutis' policies as they were hurting the economy, especially trade with Livonia. Vytautas attempted to gather his forces in Trakai and attack Vilnius, but Jogaila recaptured the throne. On July 6, he signed the two-month Truce of Bražuolė with the Teutonic Knights. Vytautas retreated from Trakai in the face of the joint forces of the Teutonic Order and Jogaila, and the city surrendered on July 20. In the meantime Kęstutis rallied his supporters in Samogitia, his son Vytautas sought soldiers in Hrodna, and his brother Liubartas recruited in Galicia–Volhynia. On August 3, 1382, the armies of Kęstutis and Jogaila met near Trakai for a decisive battle, but it never began. According to Teutonic sources, Kęstutis saw that Jogaila, aided by the Teutonic Knights, had superior forces when his Samogitian contingent was reluctant to fight. Both sides agreed to negotiate. Kęstutis and Vytautas arrived in Jogaila's camp, but were arrested and sent to a prison in the Kreva Castle. Their army was disbanded. On August 15, five days after imprisonment, Kęstutis was found dead by Skirgaila. Jogaila claimed that he had hanged himself, but rumors spread that he had been strangled. Jogaila organized a large pagan funeral to Kęstutis: his body was burned along with horses, weapons, and other treasures in Vilnius.

=== Vytautas' escape ===
Vytautas remained in prison until fall 1382. He managed to escape with help from his wife Anna, who received permission to visit her husband. According to different sources Vytautas exchanged clothes with either Anna or one of her female servants and sneaked out undetected. First he sought help from his sister Danutė and her husband Janusz I of Warsaw, then he turned to Siemowit IV, Duke of Masovia. Eventually he came to his enemies, the Teutonic Knights, asking for protection and military aid against Jogaila. According to Wigand of Marburg, Birutė, mother of Vytautas, was drowned in Brest, likely in response to his escape. Two of her relatives, Vidimantas and Butrimas, were also murdered.

The Knights received Vytautas without enthusiasm. At the time Jogaila was negotiating with the Teutonic Order. On October 31, 1382, they formulated the Treaty of Dubysa in three separate acts. It was a reward for their help in defeating Andrei and Kęstutis. In it, Jogaila promised to accept Christianity within four years, become an ally of the Order, not to initiate a war without Order's approval, and cede Samogitia, which still supported Vytautas, up to the Dubysa River. However, ratification of the treaty was continuously put off. One of the reasons for the cooling relations was a war in Masovia, that Jogaila had started without consulting the Knights. The Knights also attempted to play Vytautas and Jogaila off against each other. Other historians suggest that Jogaila was already thinking about an alliance with either Moscow or Poland. Eventually, in June 1383, a scheduled meeting between Jogaila and the Grand Master did not take place on a formal pretext and the alliance broke down. The Knights resumed their war with Lithuania.

=== Reconciliation ===
In early September, the Knights and Vytautas briefly took control of Trakai and unsuccessfully attacked Vilnius. On October 21, 1383, in Tapiau, in a small ceremony Vytautas was baptized in the Catholic rite, receiving the name of Wigand (Lithuanian: Vygandas) after his godfather Wigand, komtur of Ragnit. Vytautas received New Marienburg, a castle on the Neman River near the mouth of Dubysa, where he was joined by his relatives and followers, banished from their estates by Jogaila. They included his brother Tautvilas Kęstutaitis. Vytautas also attempted to secure support from the Samogitians. On January 30, 1384, in Königsberg, Vytautas signed the Treaty of Königsberg and promised to become the Order's vassal and to cede part of Samogitia to the Teutonic Order, up to the Nevėžis River and including Kaunas. In May 1384, the Knights started constructing a new fortress in Kaunas, called New Marienverder. On June 14, 1384, Vytautas renewed his promises, given in January in Königsberg, in this newly built fortress.

In the meantime Jogaila, probably influenced by his Orthodox mother Uliana of Tver, sought an alliance with the Grand Duchy of Moscow. He was making preparations to marry Sophia, daughter of Dmitri Donskoi, and be baptized in the Orthodox rite. In order to carry out this plan he had to reconcile with Vytautas and end the civil war. In spring 1384, Jogaila offered him Volhynia with Lutsk, but Vytautas refused, demanding to return his entire patrimony, which included Trakai, then governed by Skirgaila. Then Jogaila promised to return Trakai as soon as Skirgaila established himself in Polotsk. In July, Vytautas agreed and decided to abandon the Teutonic Knights. He then proceeded to burn two Teutonic castles on the Neman River (New Marienburg and Georgenburg). New Marienverder was besieged for six weeks by joint forces of Jogaila and Vytautas before it fell. During these attacks Vytautas captured Marquard von Salzbach, who later played an important role in Vytautas' relationship with the Knights.

== Aftermath ==
Vytautas returned to Lithuania without a clear written agreement with Jogaila. He received Hrodna, Brest, Podlaskie, Vawkavysk. In order to receive Volhynia after the death of his uncle Liubartas, Vytautas was baptized in the Orthodox rite. Skirgaila continued to rule Trakai. Vytautas pledged loyalty to Jogaila and became one of the many regional dukes. Jogaila was considering different baptism proposals. He had already refused the Treaty of Dubysa with the Teutonic Knights. He negotiated with Moscow, but it was a dangerous ally and Orthodoxy would not save Lithuania from attacks by the Teutonic Knights. Furthermore, Muscovy lost some of its power and influence after the siege of Moscow in 1382 by the Mongols. A third option was presented by Poland: it was looking for a suitable groom for Jadwiga of Poland and a worthy candidate to become King of Poland. In August 1385, Jogaila signed the Union of Krewo, promising to Christianize Lithuania, marry Jadwiga, and form a personal union between Lithuania and Poland. In 1386, he was baptized and crowned King. Skirgaila was left as his regent in Lithuania. Taking advantage of Jogaila's absence, Andrei of Polotsk renewed his bid for the throne of Lithuania. During this time Vytautas remained loyal and helped Jogaila and Skirgaila to defeat Andrei.

On April 28, 1387, after Andrei's defeat, Skirgaila received Polotsk and Trakai – thus breaking the promise given to Vytautas that he would receive Trakai when Skirgaila received Polotsk. Trying to appease his cousin, Jogaila gave him Lutsk (but left a Pole in charge of Lubart's Castle) and Volodymyr-Volynskyi. This did not help and the relationship turned sour. At the same time dissatisfaction with Skirgaila's rule continued to grow among the Lithuanians, who resented growing Polish influence in the state. They wanted to maintain Lithuanian legal distinctiveness and reserve offices for the Lithuanians. The duped Teutonic Knights continued to demand Samogitia and continued to wage war. All these circumstances allowed Vytautas to renew his struggle for power. He escaped to the Teutonic Knights for the second time and waged another civil war. It ended with the Ostrów Agreement of 1392, wherein Vytautas acknowledged fealty to Jogaila and was granted position of regent extensive autonomy in Lithuania. In 1401 he was ultimately named by Jogaila his co-ruler and formally became the Grand Duke of Lithuania. Vytautas's total reign (including time of regency) would be 38-years.

== See also ==
- List of conflicts in Europe
- List of wars involving Lithuania
- List of civil wars
