= Union of Krewo =

1385 document between Poland and Lithuania

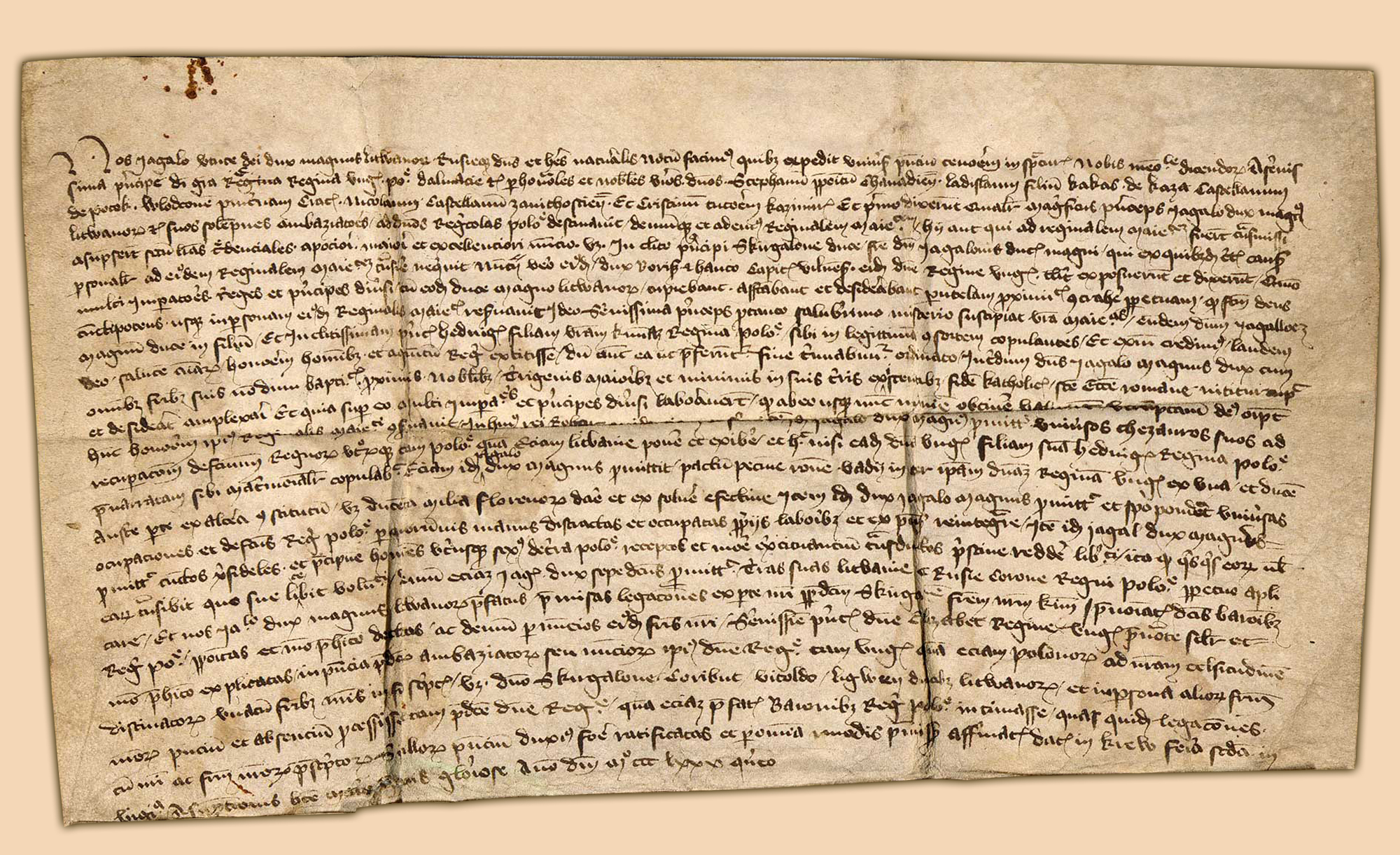
Document, signed in Kreva on 14 August 1385

In a strict sense, the Union of Krewo or Act of Krėva (also spelled Union of Krevo, Act of Kreva; Polish: unia w Krewie; Lithuanian: Krėvos sutartis) comprised a set of prenuptial promises made at Kreva Castle on 14 August 1385 by Jogaila, Grand Duke of Lithuania, in regard to his prospective marriage to the underage reigning Queen Jadwiga of Poland.

Though very limited in scope, the "Union of Krewo", in historiography, often refers not only to the particular document but to events of 1385–1386 as a whole. After the 1385 negotiations, Jogaila converted to Christianity, married Jadwiga, and was crowned King of Poland in 1386.

The union proved a decisive moment in the histories of Poland and Lithuania; it marked the beginning of four centuries of shared history of the two polities. By 1569, the Polish–Lithuanian union had developed into a new state, the Polish–Lithuanian Commonwealth, which lasted until the Third Partition of Poland in 1795.

== Background ==
=== Situation in Poland ===
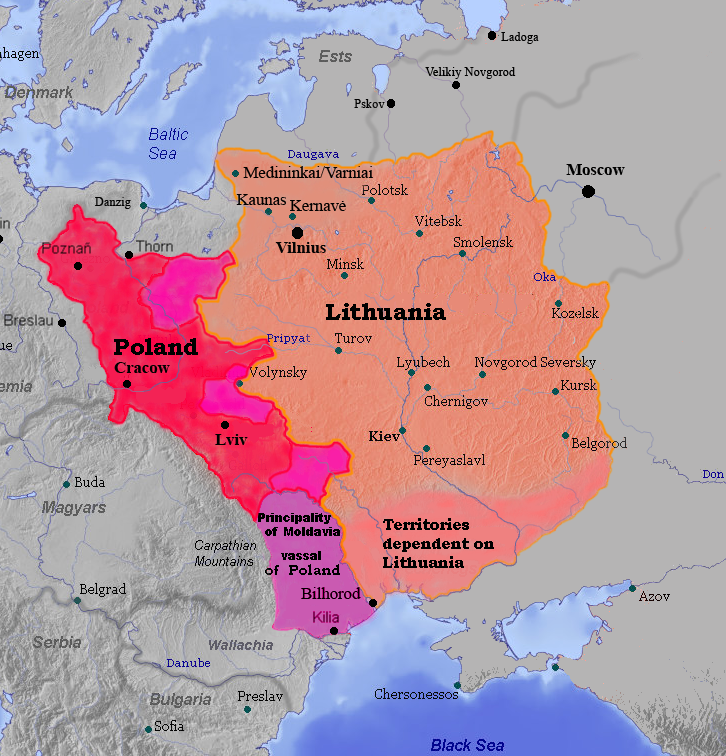
Poland and Lithuania in 1387

Louis I of Hungary died on 10 September 1382. Since he had only two surviving daughters, Mary (born ca. 1371) and Jadwiga (born ca. 1373), Poland faced a succession crisis. Candidates for the throne included Mary's fiancé Sigismund of Luxembourg, Siemowit IV, Duke of Masovia, and Vladislaus II of Opole. Mary and her fiancé were rejected by the Polish nobles, who did not wish to continue a personal union with the Kingdom of Hungary. Polish nobles competed with each other and a brief civil war broke out in Greater Poland. Eventually, after long negotiations with Jadwiga's mother Elizabeth of Bosnia, who was regent of Hungary, Jadwiga arrived in Kraków and was crowned as King of Poland (not as Queen of Poland, to emphasize her rights to the throne) on 15 October 1384. The new monarch still needed a suitable husband. She was betrothed to William of Austria, who in summer 1385 traveled to Poland in an attempt to consummate the proposed marriage and present a fait accompli. He succeeded in reaching Wawel, but was forcibly removed by Polish nobles. It is unclear whether he succeeded in consummating the marriage, but biased Austrian sources continued to accuse Jadwiga of bigamy. Nobles from Lesser Poland, including Spytek of Melsztyn, Jan of Tarnów, and Jan Tęczyński, proposed that Jadwiga marry Jogaila, Grand Duke of Lithuania.

=== Situation in Lithuania ===
Grand Duke Algirdas died in 1377 and left the throne to his son Jogaila. He inherited a large state, inhabited by pagan Lithuanians and Orthodox Ruthenians. For the last century, Lithuanians defended themselves from the Teutonic Knights, a crusading military order dedicated to conversion of the Grand Duchy into Catholicism. Jogaila understood that the conversion was inevitable and searched for the best opportunities. The Treaty of Dubysa of 1382 with the Knights included provisions of Jogaila's conversion within four years. However, the treaty was never ratified. Accepting Christianity from a long-standing enemy was dangerous, unpopular, and could push Lithuania into dependence of the Knights. In 1384, Jogaila explored another option, presented by the Grand Duchy of Moscow and brokered by his Orthodox mother Uliana of Tver: converting to Orthodoxy and marrying Sophia, daughter of Dmitry Donskoy. However, in the eyes of Catholics, Orthodoxy was not any better than paganism. Therefore, such conversion would not protect from the Teutonic attacks. A third option, presented by Polish nobles, avoided major pitfalls of the Teutonic or Muscovite proposals.

== Union ==
=== Negotiations ===
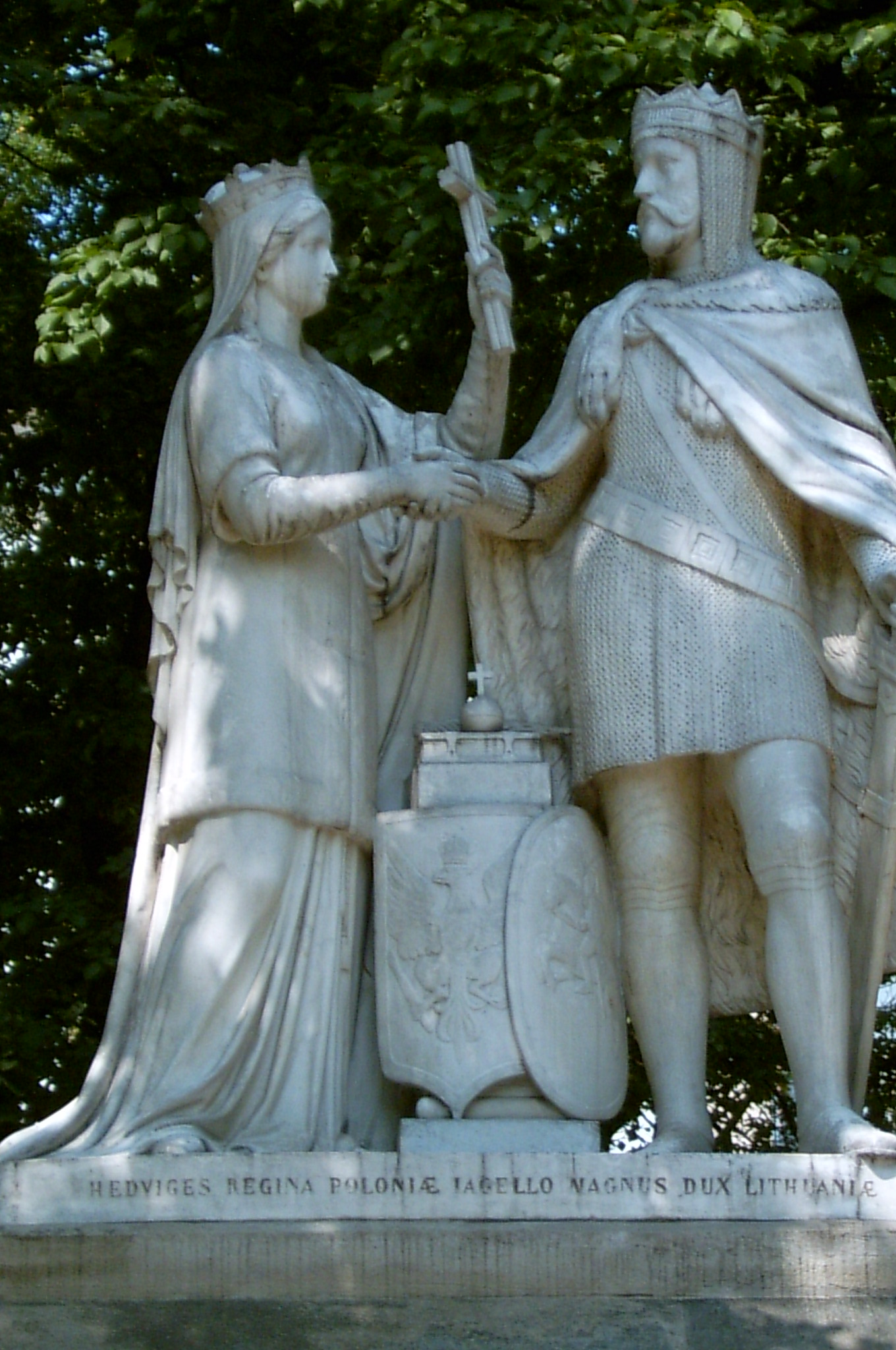
Monument of Jadwiga and Jogaila in Kraków

The relations between Poland and Lithuania were not particularly friendly. The two states were allies before, when Jogaila's aunt Aldona of Lithuania was Queen of Poland between 1325 and 1339. Poland and Lithuania battled each other in the decades-long Galicia–Volhynia Wars, but also saw opportunities to regain lands lost to Hungary and regarded the Teutonic Knights as the common enemy. It is unknown who and when proposed Jogaila as the groom for Jadwiga. Some hints show that planning and negotiations might have started as early as 1383. For example, Jogaila attacked Siemowit IV, Duke of Masovia, when he advanced his claims for the Polish throne. By the time Lithuanian envoys participated in Jadwiga's coronation in fall 1384, Jogaila's candidacy was widely known.

In mid-1385, Jogaila sent an official delegation to Poland. It included his brother Skirgaila, Duke Boris (possibly his cousin and son of Karijotas), and merchant Hanul of Riga. Hanul helped Jogaila to recapture Vilnius during the Lithuanian Civil War (1381–1384) and represented interests of merchants, who saw great trade potential between Poland and Lithuania. The representatives first appeared before the Polish nobles in Kraków and then before Queen Elizabeth, Jadwiga's mother, in Buda. A Polish delegation – two Elizabeth's envoys and three Polish nobles – was sent to Lithuania. Upon return of the Lithuanian delegation, Jogaila confirmed in writing all the promises, made on his behalf in Poland. This confirmation is known today as the Union of Krewo.

=== Content ===
The 560-word document is addressed to Queen Elizabeth and the Polish delegation. Jogaila briefly described the mission of the Lithuanian delegation and, in exchange for marriage to Jadwiga, agreed to the following:

- Christianizing Lithuania: conversion of pagan Jogaila, Lithuanian nobles and all pagan Lithuanians to Roman Catholicism
- paying compensation of 200,000 florins to William, Duke of Austria for the termination of the engagement between Jadwiga and William
- returning of all lands lost in wars by Poland. This in particular referred to territories in Red Ruthenia that Louis I of Hungary attached to the Kingdom of Hungary.
- releasing of all 40,000 or 45,000 Christians war prisoners of Poland held by the Lithuanians
- attaching (Latin: applicare) of Lithuanian and Ruthenian lands to the Crown of Poland

It was guaranteed by the seals of Jogaila's brothers Skirgaila, Kaributas, Lengvenis and their cousin Vytautas. Because the document contained promises and guarantees only by one party, Lithuanian historian Jūratė Kiaupienė concluded that the union could not have been a final international treaty and that there should have been another document finalizing the agreement.

== Aftermath ==
=== Marriage and conversion of Lithuania ===
On 11 January 1386 a Polish delegation met Jogaila in Vawkavysk and presented him with a pre-election pact, declaring that the Polish nobility agreed to elect him as their new king. The election was concluded on 1 February in Lublin. On 12 February Jogaila and his relatives arrived in Kraków and were baptized by Bodzanta, Bishop of Gniezno, three days later in the Wawel Cathedral. Jogaila's new baptismal name Wladislaus was chosen in honor of Jadwiga's great-grandfather king Władysław I the Elbow-high, the penultimate Piast. Jogaila married Jadwiga on 18 February and was crowned jure uxoris as King of Poland on 4 March. Due to negative propaganda by William of Austria and the Teutonic Knights, the marriage was not confirmed by Pope Urban VI (1378–1389); only Pope Boniface IX (1389–1404) declared it legitimate.

Right after the marriage and coronation, Jadwiga and Vytautas marched to Galicia where they defeated Hungarian forces and secured some 97,000 square kilometres (37,000 sq mi) in western Podolia. Andrei of Polotsk, Jogaila's eldest brother, used his absence to renew struggle for the throne of Lithuania. Andrei attacked southeast of Polotsk, the Livonian Order attacked Duchy of Lithuania, and Sviatoslav of Smolensk attacked Mstsislaw. The rebellion was quickly subdued.

At the end of 1386, Jogaila returned to Vilnius to carry out his other promise – to convert the Grand Duchy to Catholicism. He brought some priests, established the first seven parishes, and, according to Jan Długosz, even personally translated Lord's Prayer and Apostles' Creed into the Lithuanian language. New converts were baptized en masse, with little teaching, and were awarded wool shirts; the haste was later criticized at the Council of Constance. On 17 February 1387, Jogaila decreed that he would build Vilnius Cathedral and petition the pope to establish the Diocese of Vilnius, which he awarded with land possessions in Tauragnai, Labanoras, Molėtai. Two other privileges, issues on 20 February and 4 March 1387, awarded nobles who would convert to Christianity with new rights and granted Magdeburg rights to Vilnius. This served not only as an incentive for conversion but also equalized nobility rights in Poland and Lithuania.

=== Polish–Lithuanian union ===
Jogaila left his brother Skirgaila as his regent in Lithuania. He proved to be unpopular and Lithuanian nobility resented growing Polish influence in the state. Vytautas seized the opportunity to renew his struggle for power and the Lithuanian Civil War (1389–1392) broke out. This was resolved with the Ostrów Agreement – Vytautas became the Grand Duke of Lithuania while Jogaila retained rights of an overlord. Vytautas conducted independent internal and foreign affairs, but cooperated with Jogaila. A celebrated example of the Polish–Lithuanian cooperation was the decisive victory in the Battle of Grunwald (1410) against the Teutonic Knights. Vytautas's independence and Polish–Lithuanian relations were formalized by the Union of Vilnius and Radom (1401) and Union of Horodło (1413). Thus the Grand Duchy of Lithuania retained its sovereignty. Only the Union of Lublin (1569) created a permanent union between Kingdom of Poland and Grand Duchy of Lithuania, after which the federal state Polish–Lithuanian Commonwealth was established.

Finally, the Constitution of 3 May 1791 declared that both states were one, albeit that this was denounced in 20 October amendments (the Reciprocal Guarantee of Two Nations). Soon after, they were separated in form, spending most of the 19th century under Russian control but kept administratively separate. In the early 20th century, both states established their independence and since then, they have had no ties with each other in any formal sense.

== Historiography ==
Up until the discovery of the original document in 1835 in a register in the Archives of the Cracow Cathedral Chapter, the Union of Krewo was unknown. Usually, important state documents were archived at the Crown Archive. It was neither referenced in any contemporary documents nor cited by medieval historians. No chronicles or other written sources mentioned the August 1385 meeting in Kreva. That led the Lithuanian American lawyer Jonas Dainauskas to question the act's authenticity in 1975. However, his claims have gained little scholarly support.

=== Applicare ===
In the 1385 document, the Latin word applicare, describing a future relationship between Poland and Lithuania, has caused the most controversy and academic debate. The Latin term does not have a legal definition and possibly was deliberately chosen for its vagueness. The term is subject to wide-ranging interpretations, which can be divided into three major categories of meaning:

- That Lithuania ceased to exist as a sovereign state and became a province of Poland. This interpretation was championed by the Polish historians Feliks Koneczny (1862–1949), Anatol Lewicki (1841–1899), Henryk Łowmiański (1898–1984), and Ludwik Kolankowski (1882–1956). This view was newly interpreted by Oskar Halecki (1891–1973), who argued that Lithuania was incorporated into Poland from 1386 to 1401 and became Poland's fief to 1440.
- That Lithuania became a fief of Poland. This view was introduced by Jan Adamus (1896–1962) in 1932 and supported by Henryk Paszkiewicz (1897–1979) and to an extent by Oskar Halecki. Their main arguments was that such a large state could not suddenly become a province in reality and that the Grand Duchy preserved most elements of sovereignty.
- That Lithuania and Poland were united by a personal union. This view was introduced by the Lithuanian historians Adolfas Šapoka (1906–1961) and Zenonas Ivinskis (1908–1971), in which they argued that Poland and Lithuania were united only by the monarch.
