= Treaty of Dubysa =

1382 treaty between Lithuania and the Teutonic Order

The Treaty of Dubysa or Treaty of Dubissa (Lithuanian: Dubysos sutartys) consisted of three legal acts formulated on 31 October 1382 between Jogaila, Grand Duke of Lithuania, with his brother Skirgaila and Konrad von Wallenrode, Marshal of the Teutonic Order. During the Lithuanian Civil War (1381–84), Teutonic Order helped Jogaila and Skirgaila to defeat their uncle Kęstutis and his son Vytautas. Trying to realize promises given by Jogaila during the war, Teutonic Order organized the negotiations for the treaty. The acts were signed after six days of negotiations on an island in the mouth of the Dubysa River. The treaty was never ratified and never came into effect. The civil war resumed in summer 1383.

== Terms ==
In the first act Jogaila promised to baptize himself and convert the Grand Duchy of Lithuania to Christianity within four years. Samogitia, land that physically separated the Teutonic Order in Prussia from uniting with its branch in Livonia, was ceded to the Order up to the Dubysa River by the second act. It was the first time that during the 100-year crusade Lithuania gave up Samogitia. The third act formed a four-year military alliance – both sides promised to help each other against their enemies. Jogaila also agreed not to start a war without the Order's approval. Such provisions were limiting Jogaila's sovereignty. Some historians even suggested that such agreement would establish a lord–vassal relationship.

All three acts (only two originals survive, the third is known from a transcript made in 1410) were signed by all sons of Algirdas and Uliana of Tver (Jogaila, Skirgaila, Kaributas, Lengvenis, Karigaila, Vygantas, and Švitrigaila) and by Hanul, a merchant from Vilnius who opened the city gates in June 1382, allowing Jogaila to depose Kęstutis. Uliana signed only the act granting Samogitia to the Order. Lithuanian historians Ignas Danilevičius and Ignas Jonynas raised doubts whether this act is authentic or a forgery from 1410s, but their thesis is not widely accepted.

== Ratification and aftermath ==
Kęstutis died in a prison cell of the Kreva Castle on 15 August 1382 while Vytautas managed to escape a few months later and asked the Order for help and protection. This gave another advantage for the Order, which pushed for ratification (placing of official stamps) of the treaty. Five times the Grand Master proposed a date, but Jogaila continuously refused. The final meeting was scheduled to take place on 19 July 1383 on the same island as the original negotiations. Jogaila arrived as agreed, but the Teutonic delegation, led by Grand Master Conrad Zöllner von Rothenstein, got stuck near Skirsnemunė, just a few miles away from their destination, due to shallow water in the Neman River. Insulted Jogaila refused to move from his location and meet the Grand Master. The parties separated.

It is not entirely clear why diplomatic talks between Jogaila and the Order broke down. Some suggested that Jogaila already knew about the opportunity to marry Jadwiga of Poland and become Polish King. Others argued that Uliana, mother of Jogaila, disapproved of baptism in the Catholic rite as she was an Orthodox. Yet others pointed to Masovia where tensions rose as Jogaila started a war against Siemowit IV, who supported Vytautas and was friendly with the Order, and the Order's attempt to play Vytautas against Jogaila.

The Teutonic Order declared war on 30 July. They baptized Vytautas and supported his struggle against Jogaila to reacquire his patrimony. Eventually Vytautas and Jogaila reconciled in summer 1384: Vytautas regained his father's lands except for Trakai and Jogaila was crowned as King of Poland in 1386.
