= Kaributas =

Son of Algirdas, Grand Duke of Lithuania

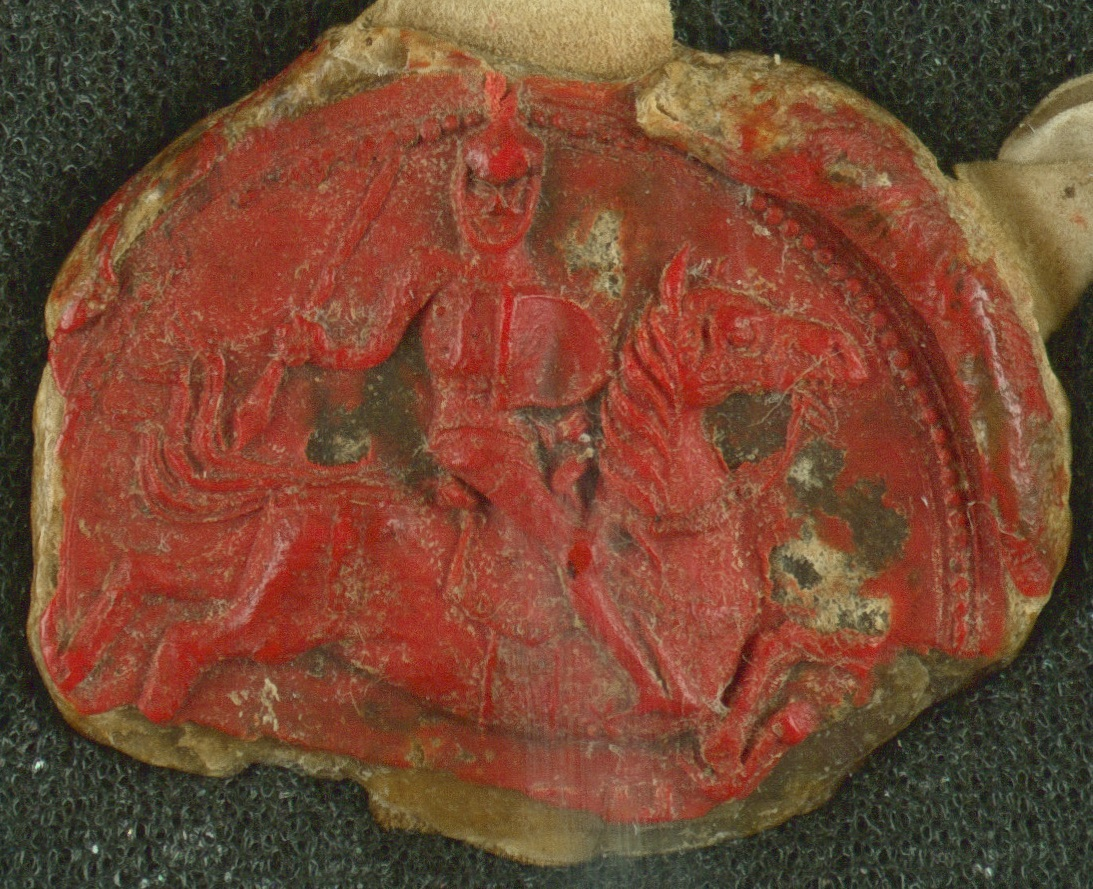
Authentic seal of Kaributas, 1386

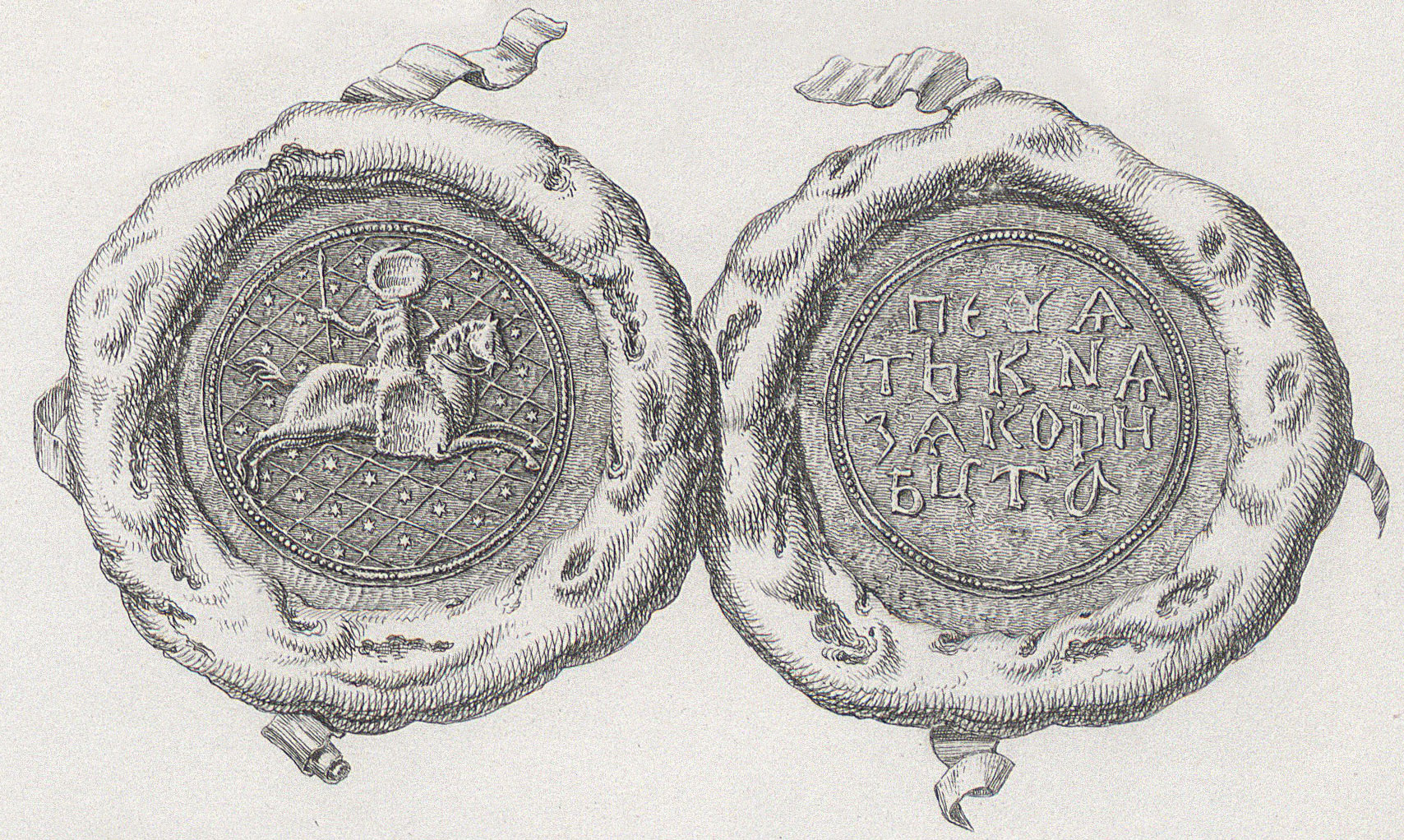
Seals of Kaributas, 1385 (1841)

Kaributas (Koribut, Korybut, baptized Dmitry; after 1350 – after 1404) was a son of Algirdas, Grand Duke of Lithuania, and reigned in Severian Novgorod until 1393.

== Life ==
Kaributas was born some time after 1350 (exact date is unknown) to Algirdas of Lithuania and Uliana of Tver. Born a pagan, around 1380 he was baptised in the Orthodox rite and became the prince of Severian Novgorod. He adopted the Christian name of Dmitry and hence is sometimes referred to as Dmitry Korybut (a combination of his Slavicised Lithuanian name Kaributas and his Christian name). He appeared in politics during the Lithuanian Civil War (1381–1384) when he supported his brother Jogaila against his uncle Kęstutis and cousin Vytautas. In 1382 he began a rebellion in Severian Novgorod, engaging Kęstutis' forces so that Jogaila could attack and capture lightly guarded Vilnius, capital of the Grand Duchy. He also witnessed the Treaty of Dubysa with the Teutonic Knights.

For his service, he was awarded possessions in Navahrudak and Lida. Kaributas continued to support Jogaila: he witnessed the Union of Krewo and fought in the Lithuanian Civil War (1389–1392). After the Ostrów Agreement, he refused to recognize Vytautas' superiority and was defeated in a battle near Lida in early 1393. Kaributas was imprisoned and stripped of his possessions. However, he was soon released and given Zbarazh, Bratslav, and Vinnytsia. Severian Novgorod was given to Fedor, son of Liubartas. Kaributas appeared last in written sources in 1404 during a military campaign waged by Vytautas against the Principality of Smolensk. Kaributas' male-line descendants included Princes Zbaraski, Wiśniowiecki and, in the Russian Empire, Woroniecki, and Nieswicki, making these families Gediminid. King of Poland and Grand Duke of Lithuania Michael Korybut Wiśniowiecki was named Korybut to foreground his agnatic descent from Kaributas.

== Marriage and issue ==
Kaributas married Princess Anastasia, daughter of Grand Prince Oleg II of Ryazan, with whom he had three daughters and three sons. Kaributas issue originated the Korybut coat of arms.

- Helena (wife of John II "the Iron" Duke of Racibórz),
- Fedor of Nesvich (1387–1442), Volhynia
- Ivan (mentioned in 1431)
- Sigismund Korybut (1395 - September 1435) (a claimant to the Bohemian Crown),
- Anastasia (wife of Vasily Mikhailovich of Kashin (died on May 6, 1382) maternal grandson of Simeon of Moscow)
- Maria (wife of Fyodor Romanovich Vorotynsky)
