= Vaidila =

Lithuanian noble (died 1381)

Seal of Vaidila, 1380

Vaidila (Woidiło, Voydiło, Woydylo; executed in 1381) was a favorite and brother-in-law of Jogaila, Grand Duke of Lithuania. The Lithuanian Chronicles present Vaidila as a kitchen assistant who rose to the top and entered the nobility only through his marriage to Jogaila's sister Maria in 1379. However, this portrayal is likely biased propaganda. It was a known practice to denounce political opponents as a common peasant. The Teutonic Knights mention that boyar Vaidila ruled Wegebeticht (believed to be near Deltuva) and Wayteldorff (Dubrowo, north of Lida).

The Lithuanian Chronicle blames him and Uliana of Tver, Jogaila's mother, for initiating the Treaty of Dovydiškės, which caused the Lithuanian Civil War (1381–1384). The Chronicle further stipulates that Vaidila held a personal grudge against Kęstutis, who did not recognize his new noble status. For his service in negotiating peace between Jogaila and the Order, Teutonic Knights gifted Vaidila some land on the Samogitian–Livonian border and perhaps two hufen (historical land unit in Germany) of land near Ragnit. When Kęstutis briefly took power during the civil war, Vaidila was hanged. Jogaila revenged his death by executing Vidimantas and his son Butrimas, relatives of Birutė, wife of Kęstutis. After Vaidila's death Maria was married off to David of Gorodets.

If Vaidila was indeed a low-born peasant, he would be the most striking example of social mobility within Lithuanian classes. He was the only Lithuanian duke known to marry a daughter of a Gediminid ruler. This marriage might be an indication that Jogaila needed domestic alliances to keep his throne after his father Algirdas died in 1377 and his elder brother Andrei of Polotsk challenged the last will.
