= Treaty of Königsberg =

The Treaty of Königsberg may refer to:

- The Treaty of Königsberg (1384), which established alliance between Vytautas the Great of Lithuania and the Teutonic Knights
- The Treaty of Königsberg (1390), which guaranteed Samogitian support to Vytautas the Great
- The Treaty of Königsberg (1627), which established alliance between Holy Roman Emperor Ferdinand II and George William, Elector of Brandenburg
- The Treaty of Königsberg (1656), which established alliance between Charles X Gustav of Sweden and Frederick William, Elector of Brandenburg
