= Treaty of Dovydiškės =

1380 treaty between Lithuania and the Teutonic Knights

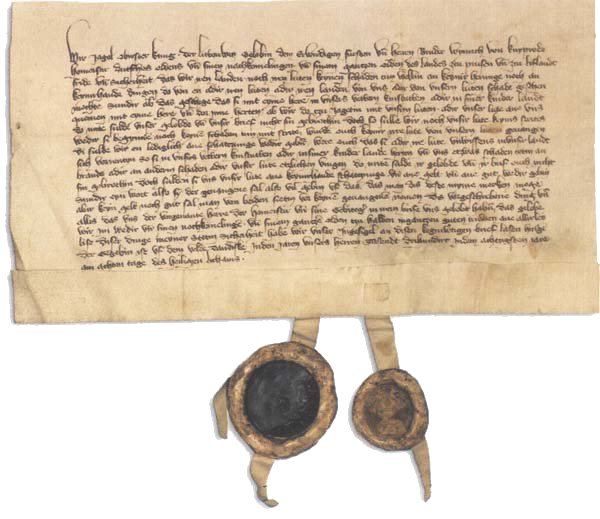
The Treaty of Dovydiškės

The Treaty of Dovydiškės (Lithuanian: Dovydiškių sutartis; German: Vertrag von Daudisken), Daudiske, or Daudisken was a secret treaty signed on 31 May 1380 between Jogaila, the Grand Duke of Lithuania, and Winrich von Kniprode, the Grand Master of the Teutonic Knights. The treaty was directed against Jogaila's uncle Kęstutis and its effect was to precipitate the Lithuanian Civil War (1381–1384).

== Background ==
The treaty was signed soon after Grand Duke Algirdas' death in 1377. Algirdas named his son Jogaila as his successor and not Kęstutis, his brother and co-ruler. Kęstutis and his son Vytautas acknowledged Jogaila's title and maintained friendly relations with him even when his right of inheritance was challenged by Andrei of Polotsk, Algirdas' eldest son. The Teutonic Knights continued their crusade against pagan Lithuania. A large campaign was organized in winter of 1378. Teutons reached Brest and as far as the Pripyat River. The Livonian Order raided Upytė. Another campaign threatened the capital in Vilnius. Kęstutis offered to negotiate a truce and exchange of prisoners. On 29 September 1379 a ten-year truce was signed in Trakai. It was the last treaty that Kęstutis and Jogaila signed jointly. However, the truce protected only Christian lands in the south, thus Kęstutis' pagan realms in northern and western Lithuania were still vulnerable to Teutonic attacks. In February 1380, Jogaila, without Kęstutis, made a five-month truce with the Livonian Order to protect his Lithuanian domains and Polotsk, just taken from his rival Andrei of Polotsk.

== Provisions ==
To cover up the signing of the treaty, the Teutonic Knights organized a five-day hunt in May 1380. The Lithuanian side was represented by Jogaila and his adviser Vaidila, Vytautas and his adviser Ivan Olshanski. Vytautas' presence further complicated explanations of the treaty and it is unclear if he knew about the negotiations. The Teutons sent grosskomtur Rüdiger von Elner, komtur of Elbing Ulrich von Fricke, and vogt of Dirschau Albrecht von Luchtenberg. The place where the treaty was signed is not known. The name of Dovydiškės is found only in the chronicles of Wigand of Marburg as Dowidisken. The treaty itself mentions Daudiske; German language texts have used Daudiske or Daudisken. However, no such place is known either in Lithuania or Prussia. Some theories claim that the treaty was signed somewhere between Kaunas and Insterburg or that the village was named Šiaudiniškė (Szaudiniszki).

The clauses of the treaty were, overall, convoluted and not entirely clear. Jogaila and the Knights agreed not to attack each other. Based on the terms of the accord, Jogaila agreed not to intervene during attacks by the Teutonic Knights against Kęstutis or his children. However, if it was necessary to help to avoid any suspicions, it would not be a violation of the treaty. Historians noted that the treaty was somewhat superfluous as Jogaila's lands were protected by the ten-year Truce of Trakai, signed in 1379. The primary purpose of the treaty was to guarantee the neutrality of the Teutonic Knights in the power struggle between Jogaila and his brothers, Dukes Andrei of Polotsk and Dmitry of Bryansk, and their ally Dmitri Donskoi, Grand Duke of Moscow. Jogaila, having secured his western front, directed his attention to the east, where he allied himself with the Golden Horde for the upcoming Battle of Kulikovo against Moscow. Some historians blamed Uliana of Tver, mother of Jogaila, or his adviser Vaidila, others pointed out generational differences: Kęstutis was about 80 years old and determined not to accept Christianity while Jogaila was about 30 years old and was looking for ways to convert and modernize the country.

== Aftermath ==
In 1381, without violating the treaty, the Teutonic Knights raided Duchy of Trakai and Samogitia, lands of Kęstutis. While raiding towards Trakai, the Teutonic Knights used bombards for the first time and destroyed Naujapilis taking some 3,000 prisoners. Subsequently the Teutonic Knights informed Kęstutis about Jogaila's secret pact. Kęstutis hesitated and asked his son Vytautas for advice. Vytautas replied that no such treaty was made. At the end of 1381, Kęstutis decided to fight against Jogaila. He seized Vilnius and declared himself Grand Duke. An internal war erupted which ended in Kęstutis' death in the Kreva Castle and Vytautas' reconciliation with Jogaila in 1384.
