= Duchy of Trakai =

Vassal state of Grand Duchy of Lithuania (1337–1413

Coordinates: 54°40′N 24°45′E

Duchy of Trakai Trakų Kunigaikštystė (Lithuanian)
- Duchy of the Grand Duchy of Lithuania
- 1345–1413
- Coat of arms

- Trakai Voivodeship (in red) in the 17th century
- Capital: Senieji Trakai, later Trakai
- History
  - Established by Kęstutis: 1345
  - Union of Horodło: 1413
Preceded by	Succeeded by
Duchy of Lithuania	Trakai Voivodeship

Duchy of Trakai (Lithuanian: Trakų Kunigaikštystė) was a subdivision of the Grand Duchy of Lithuania during the 14th and early 15th centuries. The Duke of Trakai was an important position held either by the Grand Duke of Lithuania himself or his second-in-command.

== History ==
After the demise of Gediminas in December 1341, the Duchy of Lithuania was divided into two parts: Grand Duke Algirdas ruled Vilnius and the Eastern Aukštaitija while his brother Kęstutis received the Duchy of Trakai. The ruler of the Duchy of Vilnius also was the Grand Duke of Lithuania.

=== Lithuanian Civil Wars ===
==== 1381–1384 ====
In 1382, during the Lithuanian Civil War, Kęstutis was imprisoned at the Kreva Castle and died. His nephew Skirgaila was named the new Duke of Trakai by his brother Grand Duke Jogaila.

==== 1389–1392 ====
Vytautas, son of Kęstutis, then waged a new Lithuanian Civil War to regain his patrimony in Trakai and seize power in Lithuania. The war was ended by the Ostrów Agreement on August 4, 1392. The agreement transferred the Duchy from Skirgaila to Vytautas.

=== Union of Horodło in 1413 ===
On October 2, 1413, Vilnius and Trakai Voivodeships were created by the Union of Horodło from the Duchy of Trakai. The voivodeships were ruled by an appointed official and not by the dukes.

== Geography ==
One could delineate the boundaries of the Duchy of Trakai by referring to the donative writ of Grand Duke Jogaila: from the Livonian border (Upytė) to Kobrynin (Masuria), and eastward from Podlesie to Pinsk. Naugardukas was still part of the Duchy of Trakai.

== Dukes of Trakai ==
Name	Lifespan	Reign start	Reign end	Notes	Family	Image
Kęstutis	1 January 1297 – 1 January 1382 (aged 85)	1337	1382	First Duke of Trakai	Gediminids	
Skirgaila	1 January 1354 – 11 January 1397 (aged 43)	1382	1392	Speculated to have murdered Kęstutis. Skirgaila's death itself happened in unclear circumstances.	Gediminids	
Vytautas the Great	1 January 1350 – 27 October 1430 (aged 80)	1392	1413	Son of Kęstutis; cousin of Skirgaila	Gediminids	

== Bibliography ==
- A. Prochaska, Codex Epistolaris Vitoldi, p. 3
- Memorandum of the Eastern and Southern Boundaries of Ethnographic Lithuania May 23, 1967
