= Birutė =

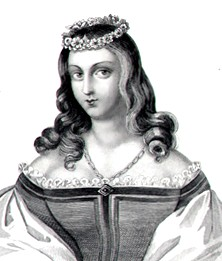
- Imaginary artistic depiction of Birutė from the 19th century

Grand Duchess of Lithuania
- Tenure: 1349 – 1382
- Born: c. 1330 near Palanga
- Died: 1382 (aged about 52)
- Burial: Palanga
- Spouse: Kęstutis
- Issue: Vytautas; Sigismund Kęstutaitis; Danutė of Lithuania
- Religion: Lithuanian polytheism

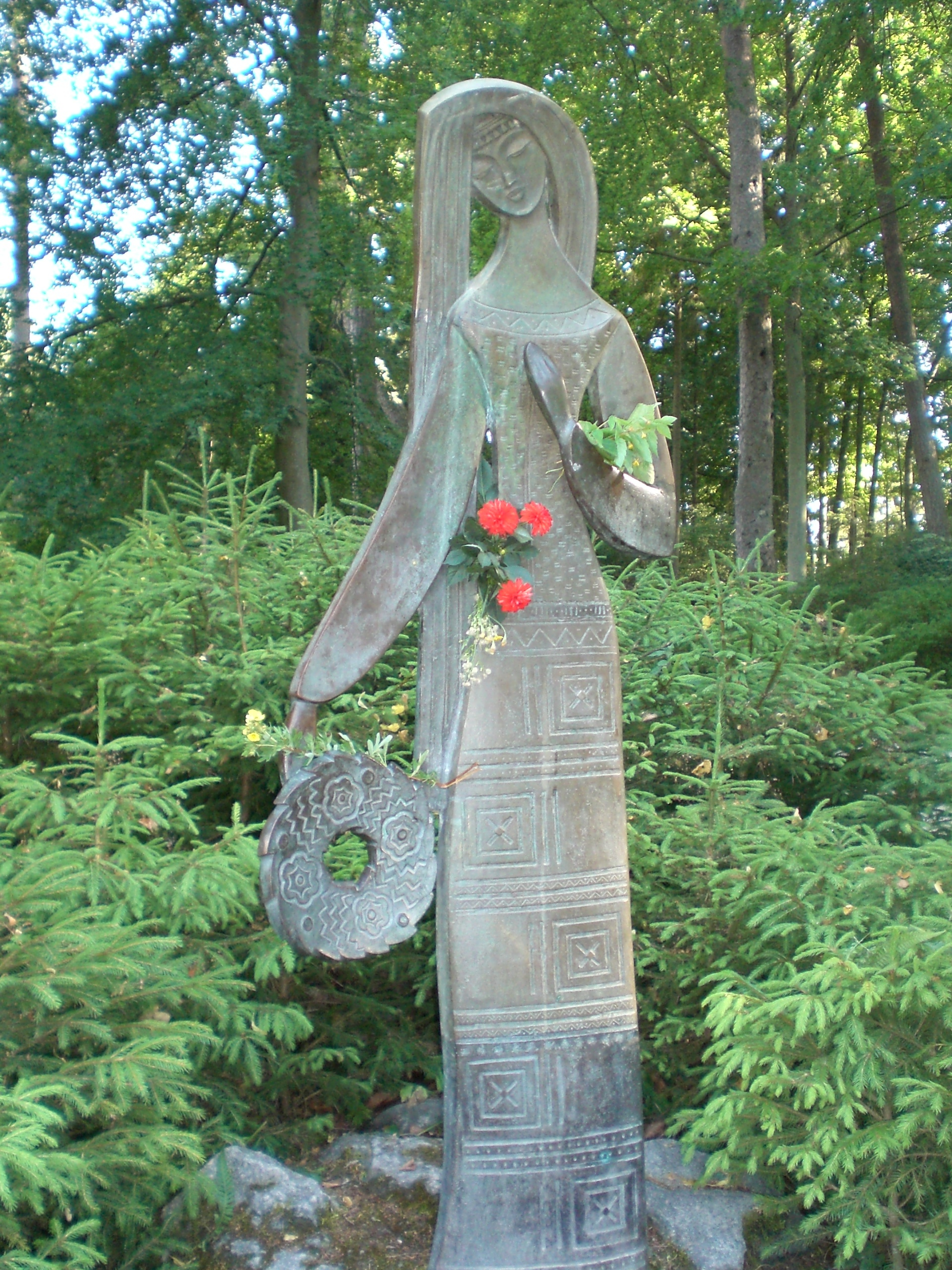
A bronze sculpture of Birutė near her presumed grave

Birutė (c. 1330 – 1382) was the Grand Duchess of Lithuania as the second wife of Kęstutis, Grand Duke of Lithuania, and mother of Vytautas the Great. There is very little known about Birutė's life, but after her death a cult worshiping her developed among Lithuanians, especially in Samogitia.

== Life ==
=== Marriage ===
She was probably born near Palanga to a Lithuanian, Samogitian or Curonian magnate family. The story of her marriage to Kęstutis became a romantic legend in Lithuania. Chronicles mention that Birutė was a priestess (Lithuanian: vaidilutė) and served the Pagan gods by guarding the sacred fire. When Kęstutis heard of her beauty, he visited the shire and asked her to marry him. She refused because she had promised the gods to guard her virginity until her death. Kęstutis then abducted her, and took her by force to Trakai where he threw a large wedding. She and Kęstutis had three sons and three daughters. Vytautas, their first son, was born around 1350. This suggests that the marriage took place in 1349 or a bit earlier.

Historian S.C. Rowell suggests that a marriage to a pagan duchess rather than to an Orthodox duchess from Slavic lands helped to win pagan Lithuanian support after Kęstutis and his brother Algirdas deposed Jaunutis in 1345.

=== Death ===
The circumstances surrounding Birutė's death are not entirely clear. Between 1381 and 1382 her husband Kęstutis waged a war against his nephew Jogaila who became the Grand Duke of Lithuania and signed a treaty with the Teutonic Knights against Kęstutis. Her husband was arrested and transported to the castle at Kreva. A week later Kęstutis was dead and some chronicles hint that he was murdered. In spite of the circumstances being unclear, one chronicle written by the Teutonic Knights briefly mentioned that Birutė was, for reasons of safety, moved to Brest, Belarus, where she was drowned in fall of 1382 (perhaps in response to Vytautas escape from Kreva). However, there are no other sources that confirm or refute this claim. Thirty-five years later, a Samogitian delegation to the Council of Constance denied her murder, and another legend claimed that Birutė returned to the shrine where she had served earlier in Palanga, and resumed serving the gods until her death there circa 1389.

Legend has it that she was buried in Palanga at the bottom of the hill named in her honor.

== Worship ==
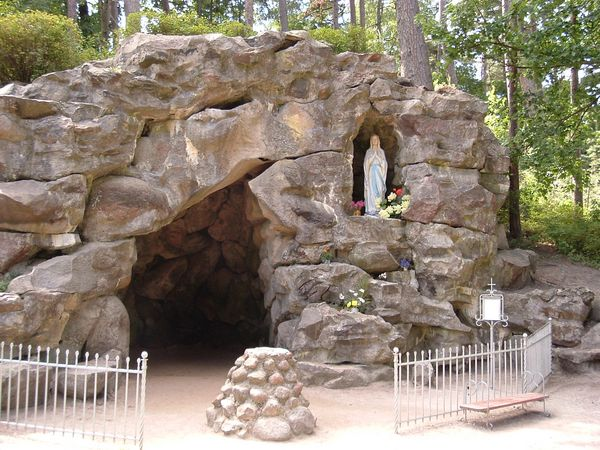
A grotto at the bottom of Birutė Hill, designed by Édouard André

A cult around Birutė developed and remained strong long after her death. She was considered to be a goddess or the pagan equivalent of a saint by the local people. In 1989 archaeologists found evidence of a pagan sanctuary and observatory, which had existed on the top of Birutė Hill in the late 14th or early 15th century. It was likely built in Birutė's honor. There are many accounts of people praying to Birutė, asking her to bestow good health or fortune upon them. To discourage people from worshiping pagan gods and Birutė's grave, a chapel for Saint George was built on the top of the hill in 1506. In 1869 the chapel was re-built and survives to this day. It is a popular destination for tourists.

Birutė Hill is the highest dune at the seaside resort of Palanga on the Baltic Seashore, and now a part of the Palanga Botanical Garden. Archaeological research shows that there was a village at the bottom of the hill in the 10th century. In the 13th century, when the Teutonic Knights and Livonian Order invaded, the villagers built a defense system with a tower. After an initial defeat, the system was rebuilt and made even stronger; it now had two towers and a wall surrounded the top of the hill. However, when this was burned in the second half of the 14th century, a pagan shrine and observatory was built in its place instead.

== Eponym ==
- Asteroid 212977 Birutė
