= Hanul of Riga =

Hanul of Riga also Hennecke, Hannike, Hans, Hanco, Hanulo (date of birth unknown – died between February 25, 1417, and December 12, 1418, in Kraków) was a merchant from Riga of German origin, a burgess of Vilnius. In 1382–87, he was namiestnik (mayor) of Vilnius. In 1382, during the Lithuanian Civil War (1381–84) between Jogaila and Kęstutis, Hanul led the city residents and surrendered Vilnius to Jogaila, who was soon to be crowned as King of Poland. He was later the trusted advisor of Jogaila and Skirgaila and participated in many diplomatic missions. He also contributed to the establishment of trade relations between Lithuania and Poland.
