= Woroniecki =

Woroniecki (feminine: Woroniecka; plural: Woronieccy) is a surname. Notable people with this surname include:

- Jacek Woroniecki (1878–1949), Polish Catholic theologian
- Michael Woroniecki (born 1954) American Christian missionary
