= Kreva =

Agrotown in Grodno Region, Belarus

Kreva Крэва (Belarusian)
- Agrotown
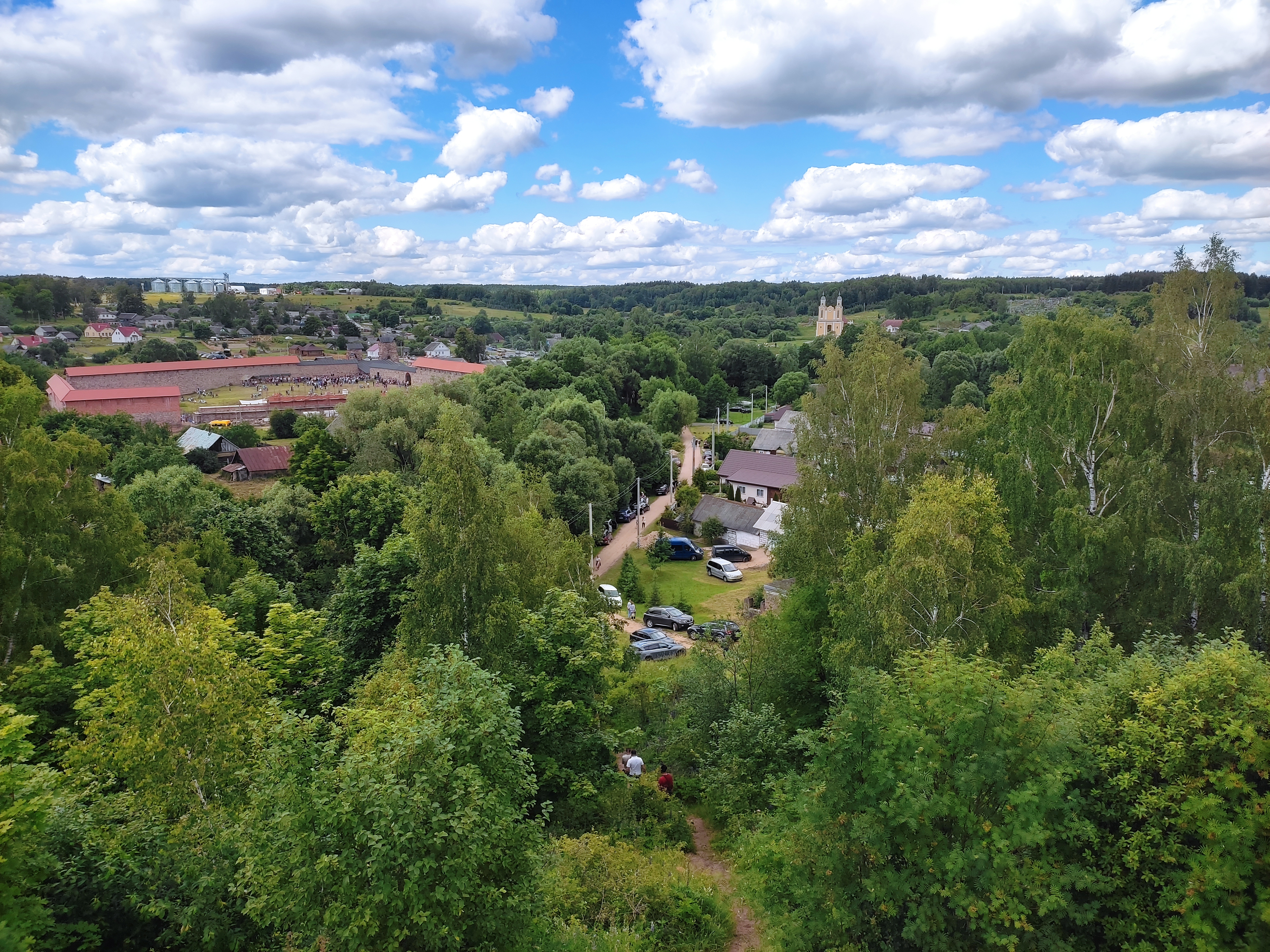
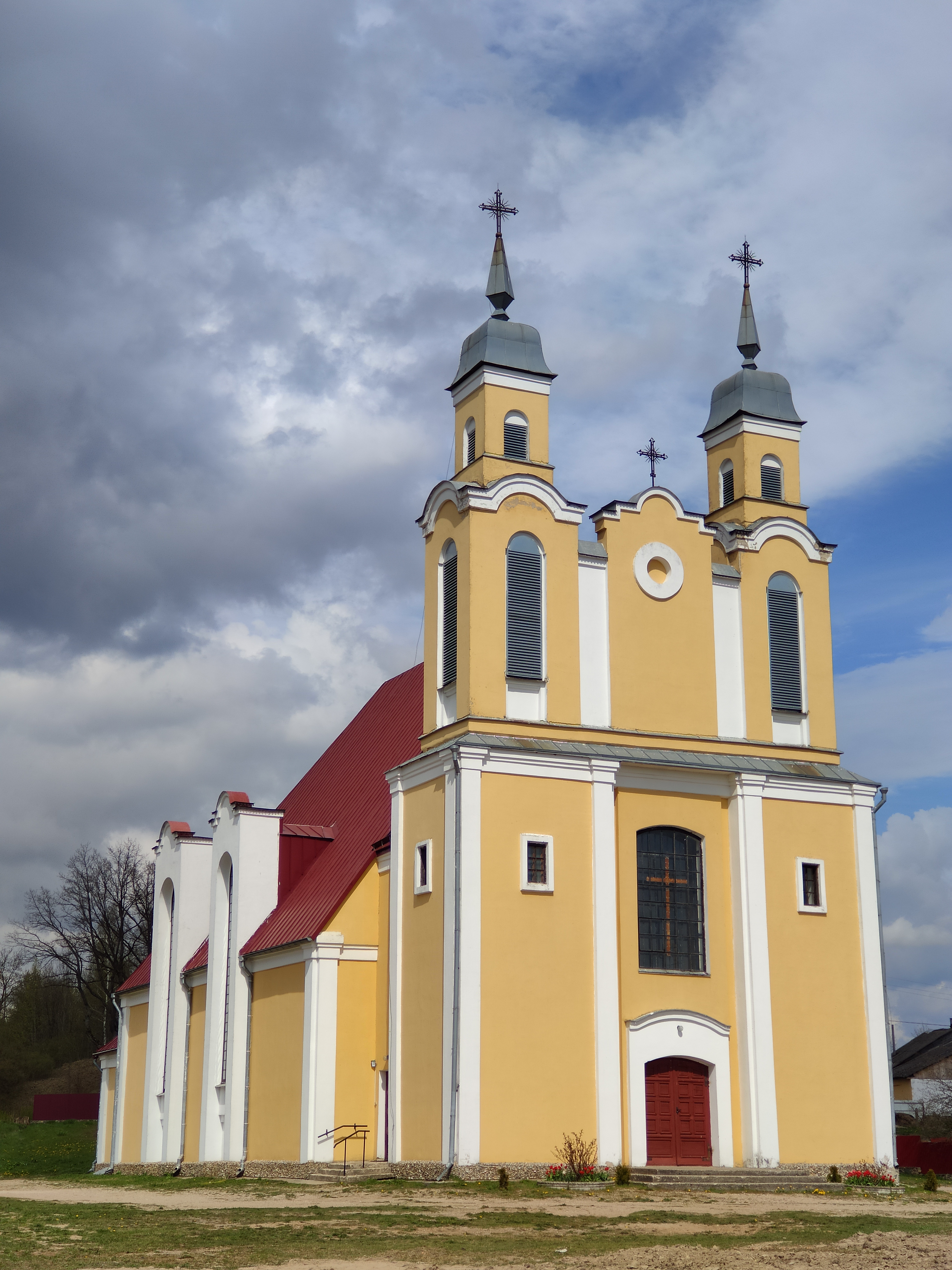
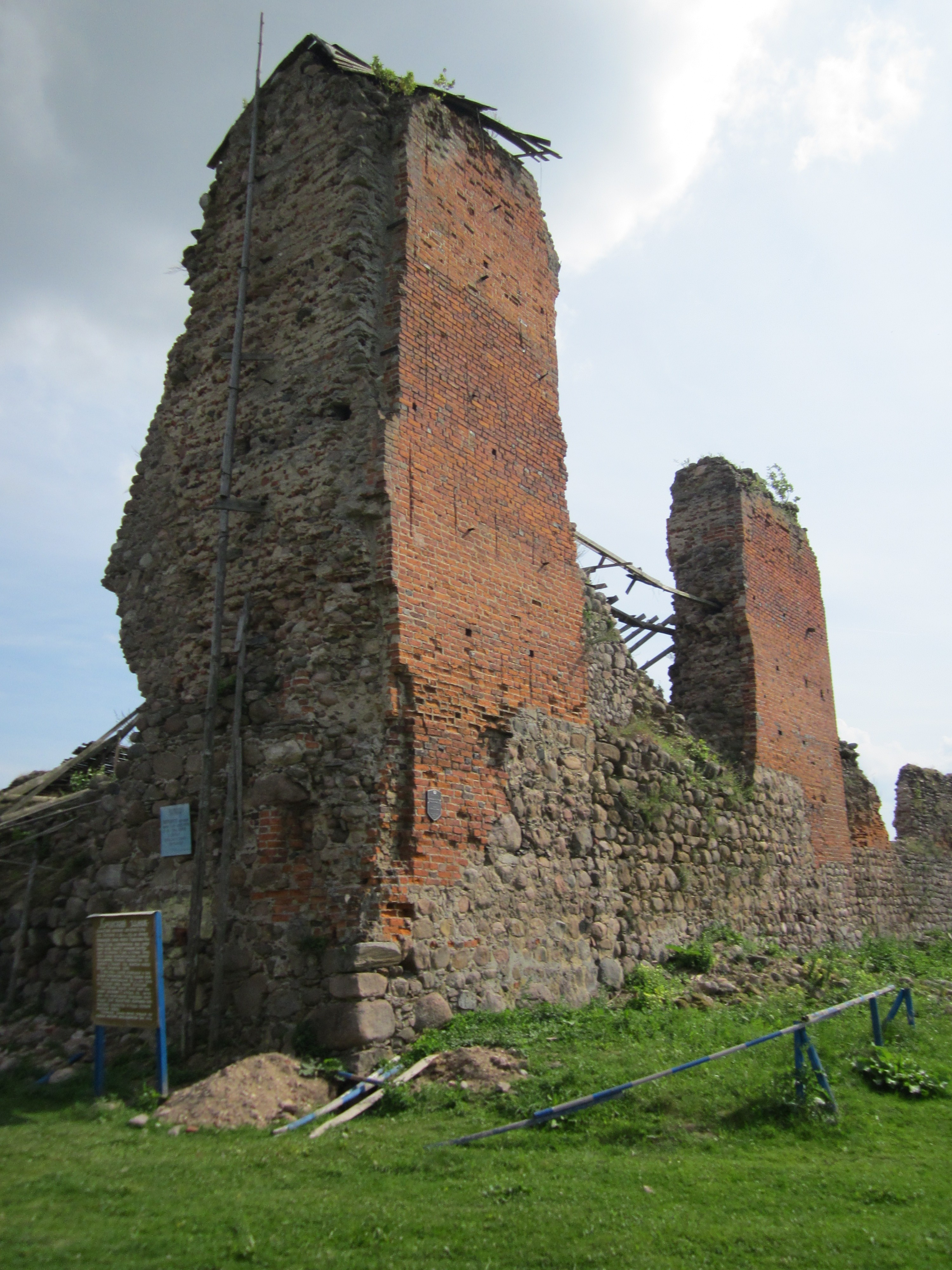
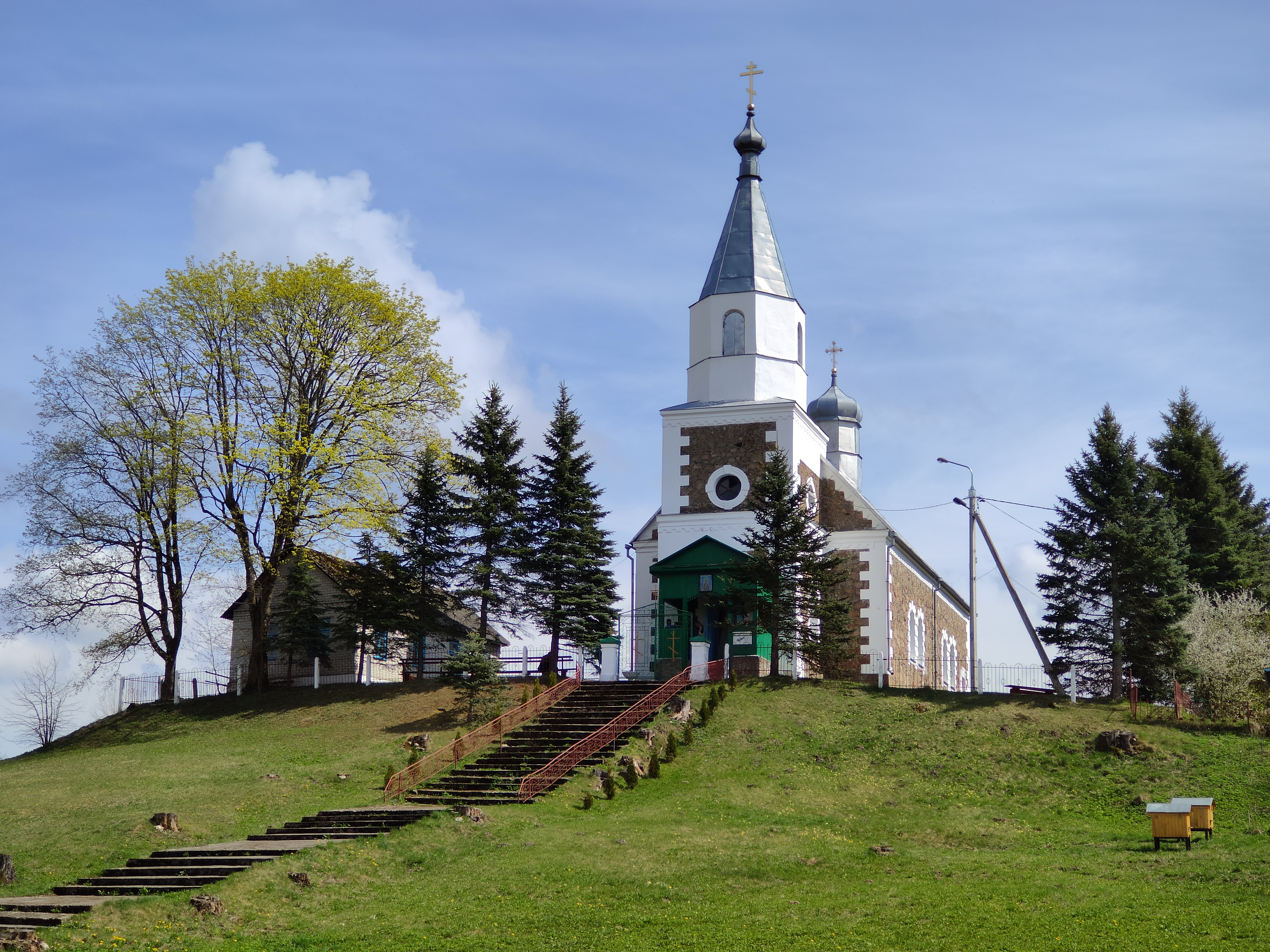
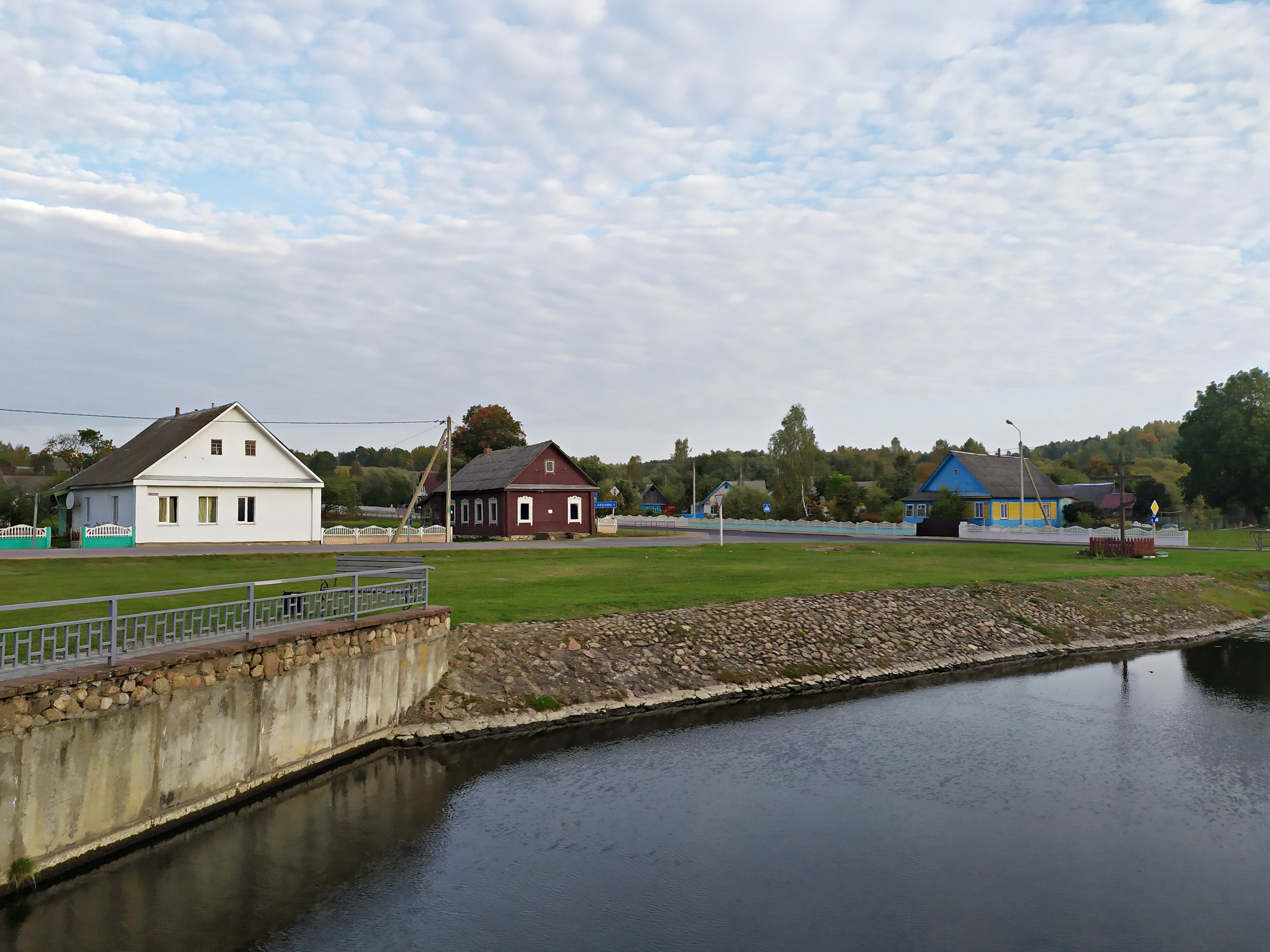
- Panorama of Kreva Catholic Church of the Transfiguration of the Lord Remnants of the medieval Kreva Castle Orthodox Church of St. Alexander Nevsky Residential houses

- Seal

- Location within Belarus
- Coordinates: 54°18′37″N 26°17′11″E
- Country: Belarus
- Region: Grodno Region
- District: Smarhon District
- Time zone: UTC+3 (MSK)

Kreva (Belarusian: Крэва, IPA: [ˈkrɛva]; Russian: Крево, romanized: Krevo; Lithuanian: Krėva, Krẽvas; Polish: Krewo) is an agrotown in Smarhon District, Grodno Region, Belarus. It serves as the administrative center of Krevas selsoviet.

The first mention dates to the 13th century. The toponym is derived from the name of the Krivichs tribe.

== History ==
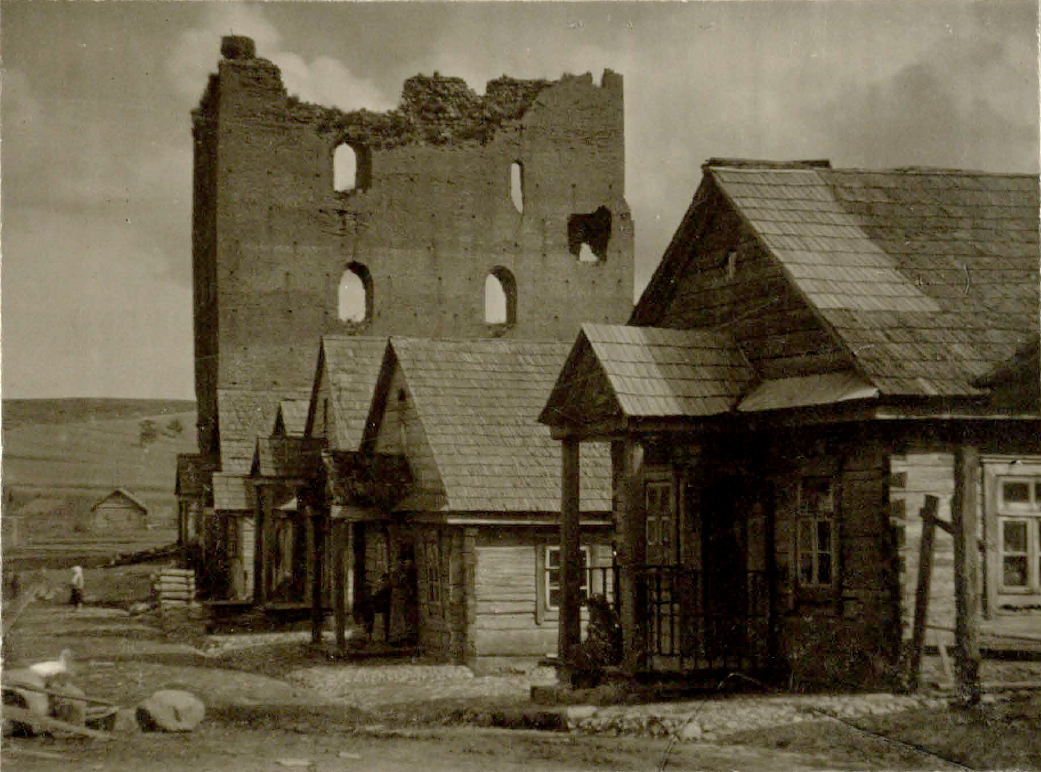
Castle Street before 1915

The Kreva Castle, built of brick and stone, dates from the early-mid 14th century in the Grand Duchy of Lithuania, and was likely commissioned under Grand Duke Gediminas. It stood in what was then a linguistically mixed region of the Grand Duchy of Lithuania, politically ruled by Lithuanian dynasty but inhabited predominantly by East Slavic (Ruthenian) populations. After Gediminas' death in 1341, Kreva became the patrimony of his son and successor, Algirdas.

In 1382, the Grand Duke Kęstutis was imprisoned in Kreva during the Lithuanian Civil War and subsequently murdered on the order by his nephew Jogaila. In 1385, the Union of Krewo (Act of Kreva) was signed in Kreva. In 1387, following the Christianization of Lithuania, the Grand Duke Jogaila established the first Catholic parish in the Lithuanian pagan lands and built a church which is now known as the Church of St. Mary.

The ruins of the castle were severely damaged during World War I, as they were near the front lines. They remain extant to the present day. Before World War II, 500 Jews lived in the village. After the German occupation of the town they were kept imprisoned in a ghetto and used as slave labourers in harsh conditions. They were deported in other ghettos in Vilnius and Ashmyany in 1942.

== Notable people ==
- Nathan Mileikowsky, a Zionist rabbi, grandfather of Benjamin Netanyahu, Prime Minister of Israel
- Al Kelly, vaudeville comedian
