= Kęstutis =

Grand Duke of Lithuania from 1381 to 1382

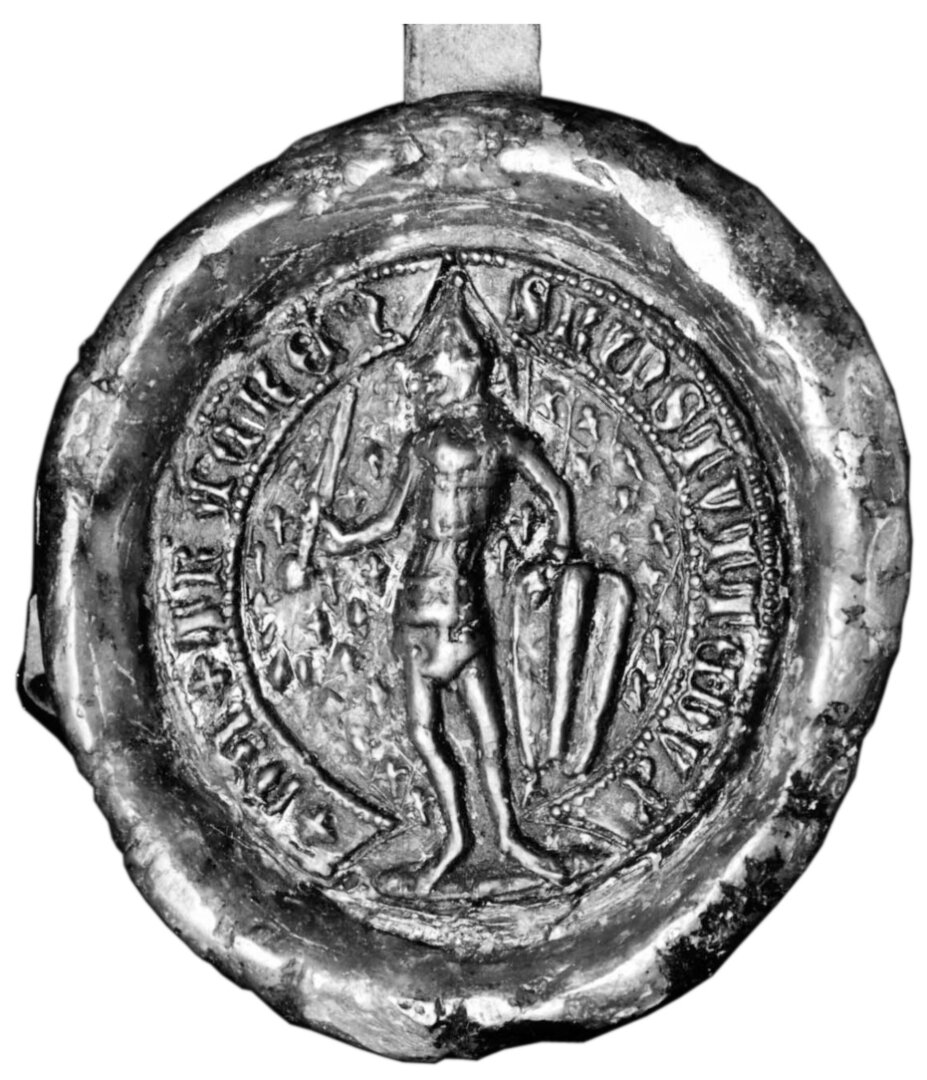
- Seal of Kęstutis

Grand Duke of Lithuania
- Reign: 1345?–1382; Attested: 1349–1351; 1381–1382
- Predecessor: Unclear: Jaunutis; Algirdas or Jogaila
- Successor: Jogaila
- Co-ruler: Algirdas; Jogaila
- Born: c. 1297; Senieji Trakai, Grand Duchy of Lithuania
- Died: 1382 (aged 84–85); Kreva, Grand Duchy of Lithuania
- Spouse: Birutė
- Issue Detail: 9, including Vytautas; Sigismund Kęstutaitis; Danutė of Lithuania
- Dynasty: Gediminids
- Father: Gediminas
- Mother: Jaunė
- Religion: Baltic religion

Kęstutis (Note: Latin: Kinstut, Lithuanian pronunciation: [kʲæːˈstʊtʲɪs]; Belarusian: Кейстут; Old East Slavic: Кестути) (c. 1297 – 3 or 15 August 1382) was the sole Duke of Trakai from 1342 to 1382 and Grand Duke of Lithuania, believed to rule together with his brother Algirdas (until 1377), and with his nephew Jogaila (from 1377 to 1381).

The name "Kęstutis" is a derivative from the old form of the name Kęstas, which is a shortened version of such Lithuanian names as Kęstaras, Kęstautas (there kęs-ti means to cope). Historic writing sources reflect different Lithuanian pronunciation.

== Early life and division of power ==
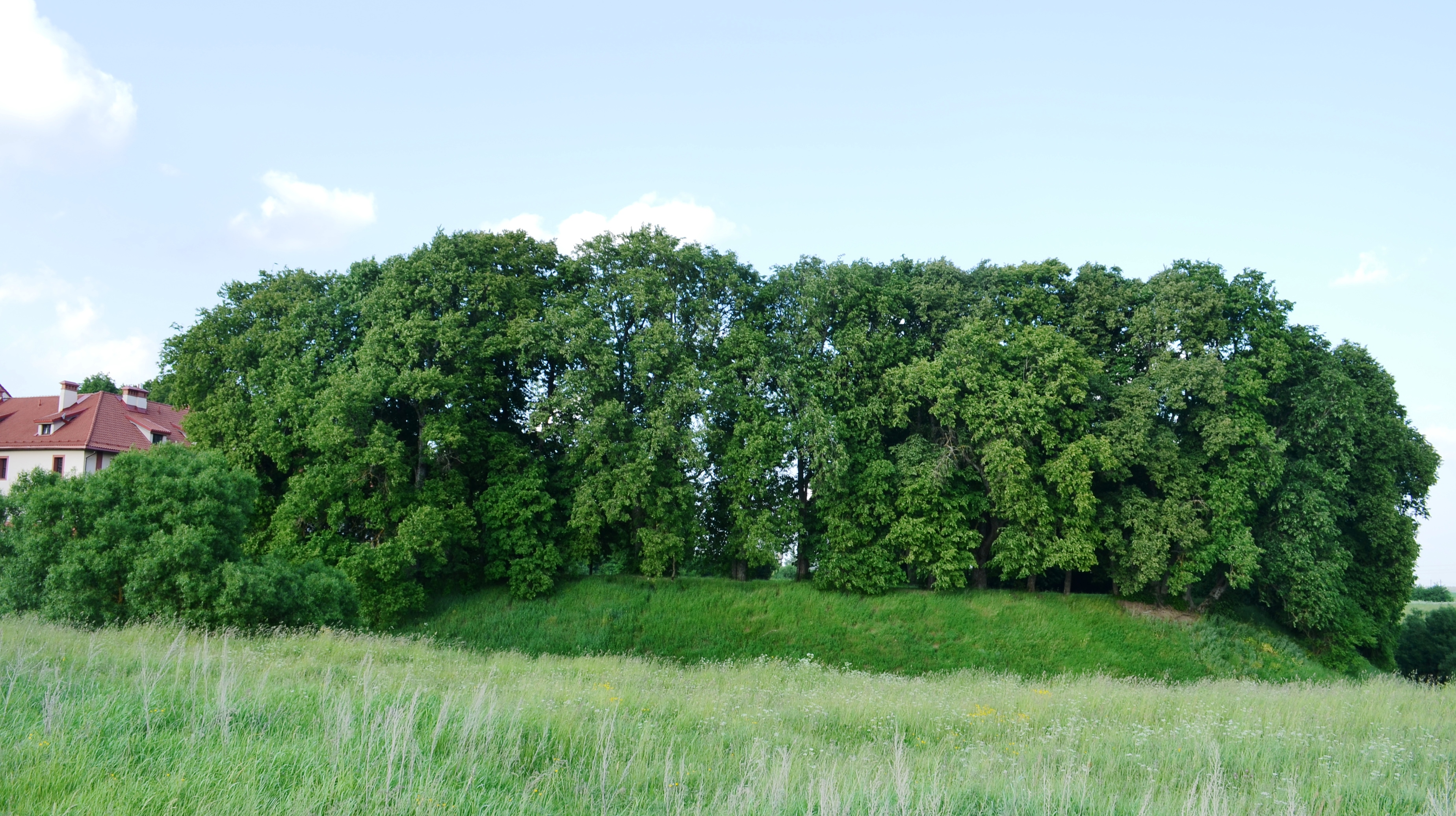
The hillfort of Senieji Trakai Castle where the wedding of Grand Duke Kęstutis and Birutė was held

Kęstutis was the son of the Grand Duke Gediminas. His younger brother, Jaunutis, succeeded his father as Grand Duke of Lithuania. Together with his brother Algirdas, Kęstutis conspired to remove Jaunutis from power. They were successful in their efforts. They divided their holdings into an eastern and western sphere of influence. The Duchy of Trakai was established in 1337 as a result. Kęstutis' efforts were concentrated in the west, while Algirdas' were concentrated in the eastern part of these territories. Kęstutis organized the defence of western Lithuania and Samogitia against the Teutonic Knights, and organized raids against the German Order. During Kęstutis's rule, Teutonic raids into Lithuania reached their peak.

== Co-ruler of Lithuania ==
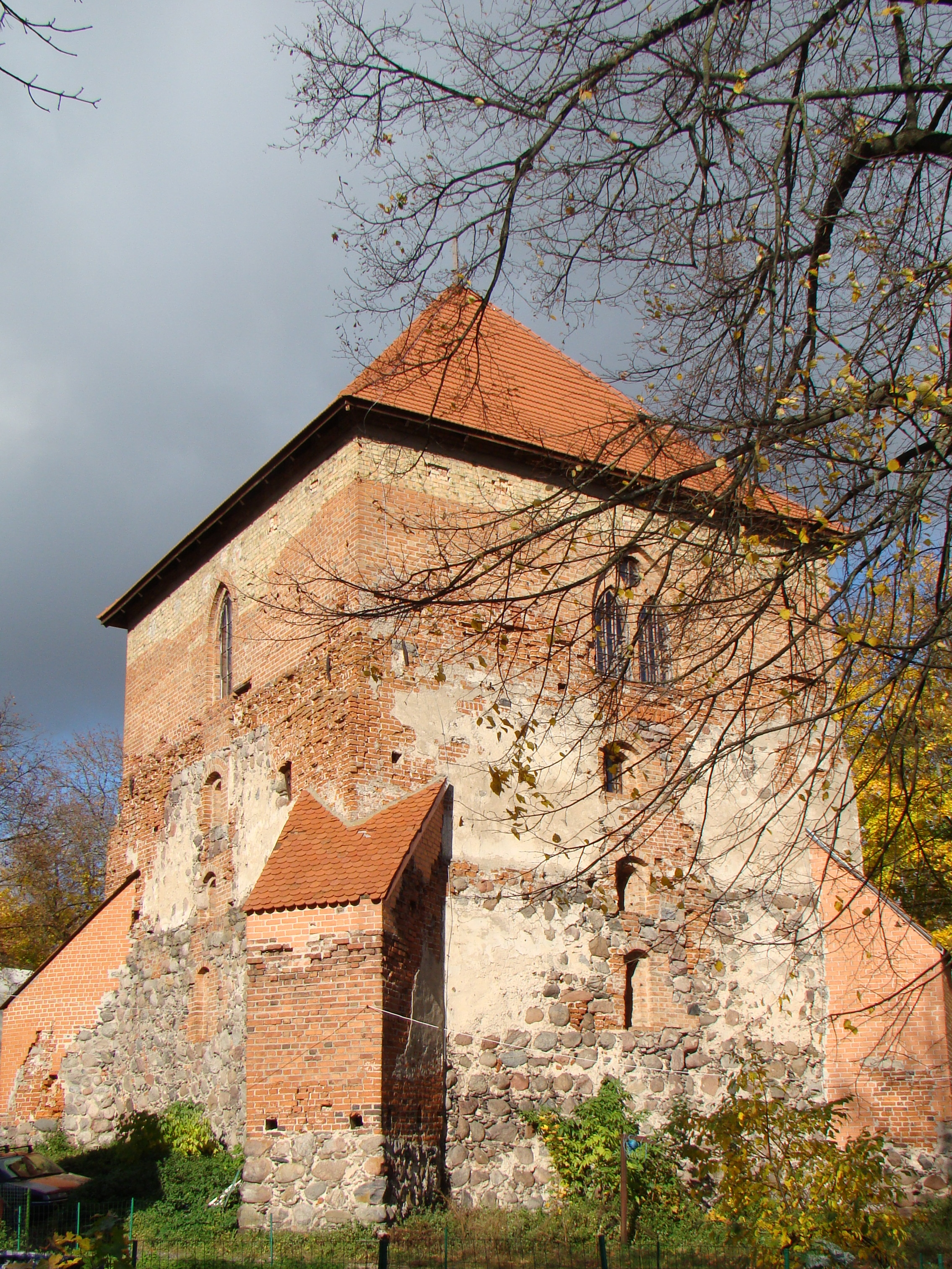
Trakai Peninsula Castle built by Kęstutis

Kęstutis wielded significant influence during the reign of Algirdas, and it appears the two were officially co-rulers as Grand Dukes, with Algirdas being the dominant co-ruler. It is uncertain at what point Kęstutis started to use the title of the Grand Duke, but he is attested in the office in years 1349-1351.

Kęstutis employed different military as well as diplomatic means in his struggle on the western borders of the Grand Duchy of Lithuania. In 1349, to avoid further clashes with the Teutonic Order, he started negotiations with Pope Clement VI for the Christianization of Lithuania, receiving promises for royal crowns for him and his sons. Algirdas willingly remained aside of the business and was concerned with the order in the Ruthenian part of the state. The intermediary in the negotiations, Polish King Casimir III, made an unexpected assault on Volhynia and Brest in October 1349, which ruined Kęstutis' plan. During the Polish-Lithuanian war for Volhynia, King Louis I of Hungary made a peace agreement with Kęstutis on 15 August 1351, according to which Kęstutis obliged himself to accept Christianity and provide the Kingdom of Hungary with military aid, in exchange for the royal crown. The agreement was approved with a pagan ritual by Kęstutis to convince the other side. In fact, Kęstutis had no intentions to comply with the agreement and ran away on the way to Buda.

== In crusaders' captivity ==
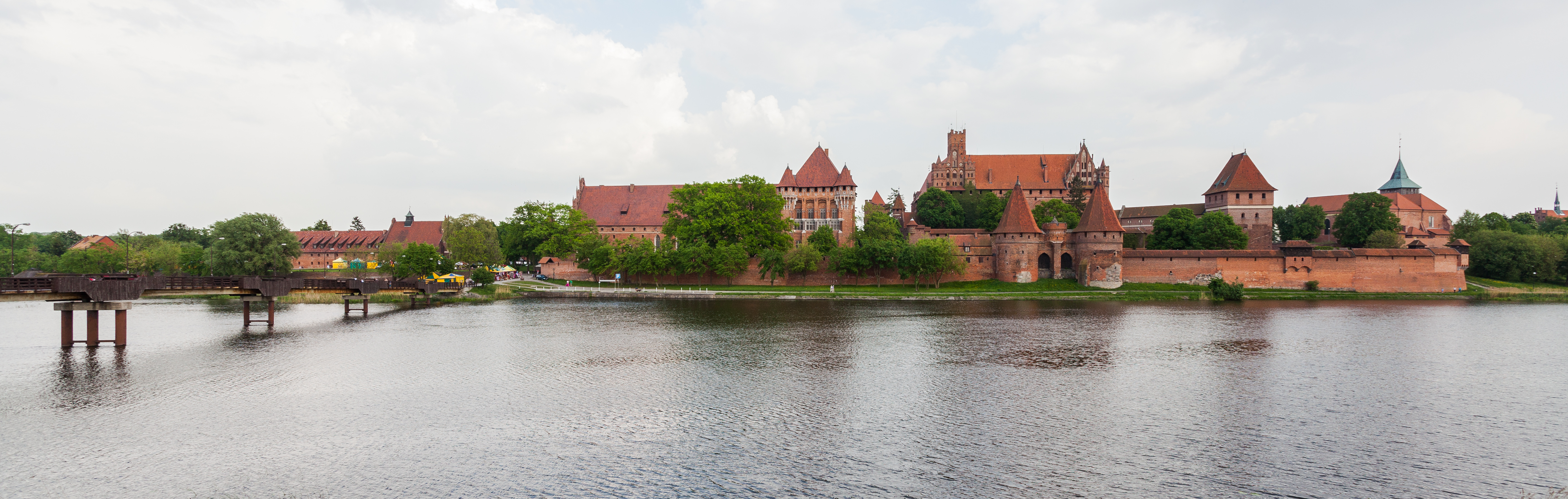
Malbork Castle, where Kęstutis was detained in 1361

In March 1361, Kęstutis, along with his son Patrikas and his brother Algirdas, destroyed and took over the Teutonic Eckersberg and Johannisburg castles. A small squad of Teutonic knights that were returning from this event attacked the camp of Kęstutis and Algirdas near the Ublik (Wobel) lake. After, a skirmish Kęstutis, who was captured by the crusaders, was detained in Malbork Castle. Kęstutis, being over 60 years old at the time, was only defeated by the third experienced knight who attacked him. Negotiations regarding Kęstutis's liberation were arranged two times but without results. The ransom the crusaders asked for in exchange for Kęstutis' freedom was most likely too high. Kęstutis managed to escape from captivity about half a year later. He, with the help of his servant Alfas, broke a hole in a three meter-thick wall and left the castle by horses dressed up as Teutonic knights. The escape was well planned and it is assumed that Algirdas and Birutė, Kęstutis's wife, greatly contributed to the planned escape.

== Civil war and death ==
Algirdas died in 1377 and left the throne to Jogaila, one of the sons he had from the second marriage to Uliana of Tver. Kęstutis and Vytautas continued to recognize Jogaila's authority even when his right of inheritance was challenged by Andrei of Polotsk, Algirdas' eldest son from his first wife. Vytautas in his Memorial (written c. 1390) noted that his father ruled over Lithuania "until he [Jogaila] grew up and people get used to him", suggesting Jogaila was very young man at the time of his acension, presumably still teenager, and Kęstutis de facto ruled on his behalf. The Teutonic Knights continued their crusade against pagan Lithuania and both Jogaila and Kęstutis looked for opportunities to establish a truce. On September 29, 1379, a ten-year truce was signed in Trakai. It was the last treaty that Kęstutis and Jogaila signed jointly. In February 1380, Jogaila, without Kęstutis, made a five-month truce with the Livonian Order to protect his Lithuanian domains and Polotsk.

On 31 May 1380, Jogaila and Grand Master Winrich von Kniprode signed the secret Treaty of Dovydiškės. Based on the terms of the accord, Jogaila agreed not to intervene during attacks by the Teutonic Knights against Kęstutis or his children. However, if providing aid to Kęstutis would be necessary to help to avoid any suspicions, it would not be a violation of the treaty. The motives behind the treaty are not entirely clear. Some historians blamed Uliana, mother of Jogaila, or his adviser Vaidila, while others pointed out generational differences: Kęstutis was about 80 years old and determined not to accept Christianity, while much younger Jogaila (who age ranged between 16 and 30 years old in 1380) was looking for ways to convert and modernize the country. Still, others suggested that the treaty was primarily directed against Andrei and his allies – brother Dmitry of Bryansk and Grand Duke of Moscow Dmitri Donskoi. Jogaila, having secured his western front, allied himself with the Golden Horde against the Grand Duchy of Moscow for the upcoming Battle of Kulikovo.

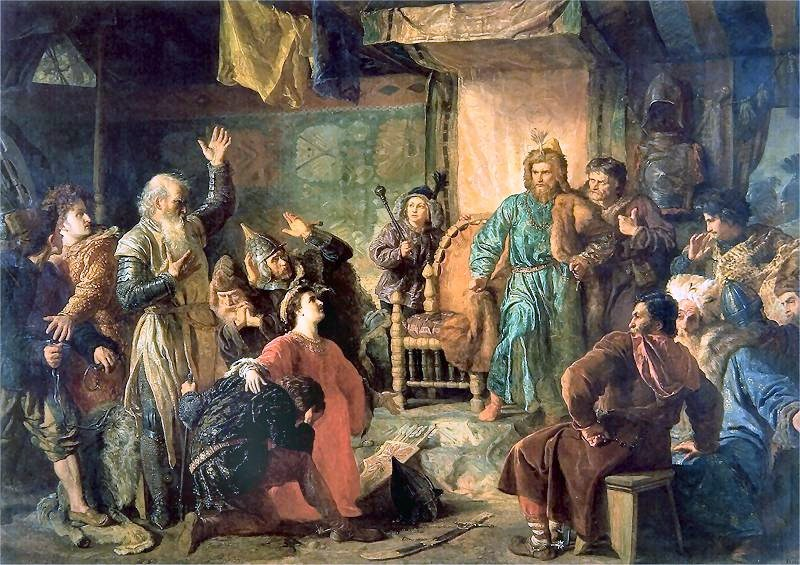
Vytautas and Kęstutis imprisoned by Jogaila. Painting by Wojciech Gerson

Without violating the Treaty of Dovydiškės, the Teutonic Knights raided the Duchy of Trakai and Samogitia twice. In August 1381, Komtur of Osterode informed Kęstutis about the secret treaty. In the same month, he took advantage of Polotsk's rebellion against Skirgaila. Jogaila was away to subdue the rebellion and his absence provided a good opportunity to capture Vilnius, capital of the Grand Duchy. Kęstutis might have been challenged by Prince Fiodor, Jogaila's elder half-brother and Algirdas's first chosen heir, who apparently put his own claim to the Lithuanian throne; however, Kęstutis quickly set him aside and declared himself the sole Grand Duke while Jogaila was taken prisoner on his way back to Vilnius. Jogaila pledged his loyalty to his uncle and was released. He received his patrimony, Kreva and Vitebsk. Kęstutis resumed the war with the Teutonic Knights; his army raided Warmia and attempted to capture Georgenburg (Jurbarkas).

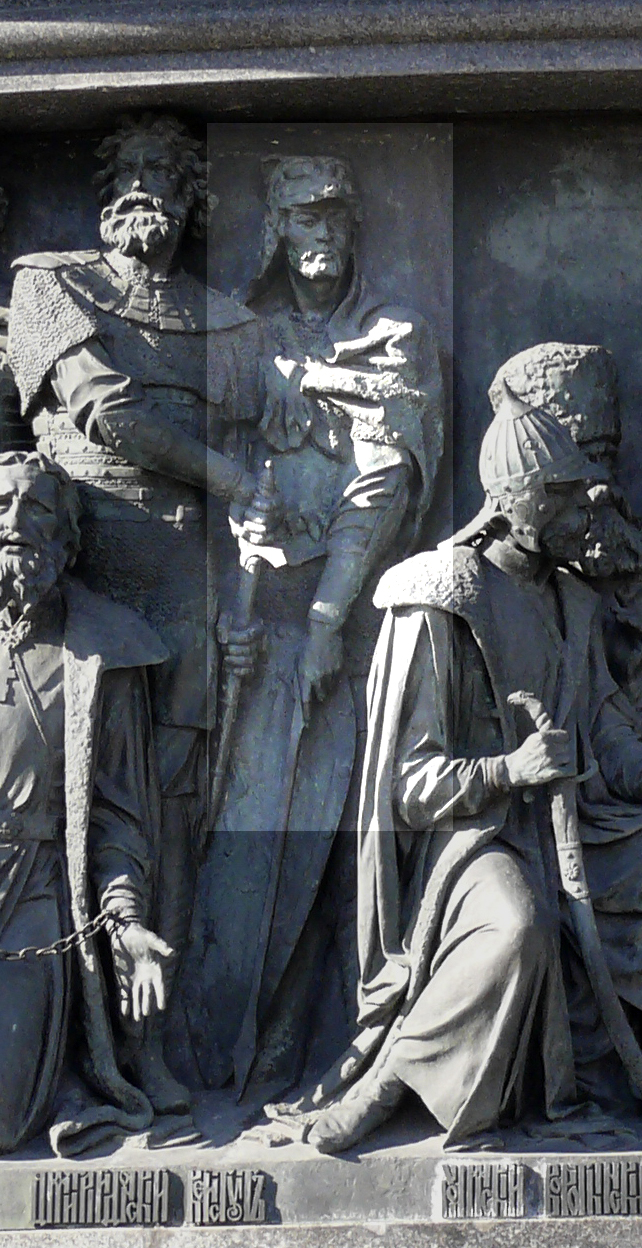
Kęstutis on the Millennium of Russia monument in Veliky Novgorod.

On 12 June 1382, while Kęstutis was away to fight Dymitr Korybut of Novhorod-Siversky and Vytautas was away in Trakai, residents of Vilnius, led by merchant Hanul of Riga, let Jogaila's army into the city. The merchants were dissatisfied with Kęstutis's policies as they were hurting the economy, especially trade with Livonia. Jogaila recaptured the throne and allied with the Teutonic Knights. In the meantime, Kęstutis rallied his supporters in Samogitia, his son Vytautas sought soldiers in Hrodna, and his brother Liubartas recruited in Galicia–Volhynia. In August 1382, the armies of Kęstutis and Jogaila met near Trakai for a decisive battle, but it never began. Both sides agreed to negotiate. Kęstutis and Vytautas arrived to Jogaila's camp, but were arrested and sent to a prison in the Kreva Castle. Their army was disbanded. On 15 August, five days after imprisonment, Kęstutis was found dead by Skirgaila. Jogaila claimed that he hanged himself, but few believed him. Jogaila organized a large pagan funeral for Kęstutis: his body was burned with horses, weapons, and other treasures in Vilnius, presumably in Šventaragis' Valley. Vytautas managed to escape; he later reconciled with Jogaila and was proclaimed his co-ruler as Grand Duke in 1401.

== Legacy ==
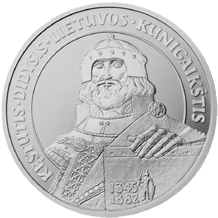
Litas commemorative coin dedicated to Kęstutis

Kęstutis is a popular male name in Lithuania. Mikalojus Konstantinas Čiurlionis wrote a symphonic overture Kęstutis in 1902. Petras Tarasenka, Lithuanian historian and archeologist, wrote a short story Pabėgimas (The Escape) in 1957, depicting Kęstutis's escape from the Teutonic Order captivity in Marienburg Castle. A monument to commemorate Kęstutis was erected in Prienai in 1937, and was then restored in 1990. The "Grand Duke Kęstutis Motorized Infantry Battalion" of the Lithuanian Land Force was named after Kęstutis. A military district of Lithuanian partisans was named in honor of Kęstutis — Kęstutis military district.

The Millennium of Russia monument has a sculpture for Kęstutis.

== Popular culture ==
Kęstutis is featured in the 2021 video game Age of Empires II: Definitive Edition - Dawn of the Dukes in a campaign detailing the exploits of himself and his brother Algirdas.

== Family ==
Kęstutis married Birutė around 1344. Together, they had 9 children:

- Vytautas the Great (Alexander; c. 1348 – 27 October 1430), Grand Duke of Lithuania (1401 – 1430)
- Vaidotas (c. 1345 – after 1390), Duke of Navahrudak
- Butautas
- Tautvilas Kęstutaitis (Conrad; c. 1350 – September 1390), Prince of Black Ruthenia (1386–1390)
- Žygimantas Kęstutaitis (after 1360 – murdered on 20 March 1440), Duke of Trakai, Grand Duke of Lithuania (1432–1440)
- Mikova (Maria; died in 1404), Grand Princess of Tver (1375–1404?)
- Danutė of Lithuania (Anna; 1362 – 25 May 1448), Princess of Warsaw (1376–1429)
- Rimgailė (Anne; 1367/1369 – 1433), Princess of Masovia (4 February – 30 June 1392), Voivodess of Moldavia (1419–1421)
- A daughter (c. 1347 – ?)

== See also ==
- House of Kęstutis – family tree of Kęstutis
- Gediminids

== Further read ==
- Kęstučio pabėgimo peripetijos

== Notes ==
Kęstutis Gediminid dynasty Born: c. 1296 Died: May 1382
New title	Duke of Trakai; 1345–1382	Succeeded by Jogaila
Preceded by Jaunutis	Grand Duke of Lithuania; 1342?–1382; With: Algirdas and Jogaila	Succeeded by Jogaila
