= Kreva Castle =

Former castle in Kreva, Belarus

Coordinates: 54.310°N 26.284°E

Kreva Castle (Belarusian: Крэўскі замак, Lithuanian: Krėvos pilis, Polish: zamek w Krewie) is the ruins of a major fortified residence of the rulers of Grand Duchy of Lithuania Gediminas and Algirdas in the village of Kreva, Belarus. The village lies 220 metres (720 ft) above sea level.

During the Lithuanian Civil War (1381–1384), Jogaila, Algirdas's son, arrested and imprisoned his uncle Kęstutis and cousin Vytautas in the Kreva Castle in 1382. One week later, Kęstutis was found dead. Whether he died of natural causes or was murdered is still a matter of debate. His son, Vytautas, however, escaped from Kreva and fled to the Teutonic Order.

The Union of Krewo (Act of Krewo), the first step towards the Polish–Lithuanian Commonwealth, was signed in the castle three years later. The castle was sacked by the Crimean Tatars in the early 16th century and stood unoccupied for a long time. By the 19th century, much of the walls had crumbled away. World War I dealt a final blow to the decaying structure, since the castle stood on the front line between Russian and German armed forces. In the 19th and 20th centuries, the ruins were partially conserved, particularly by Poland in 1929. However, the monument has been decaying ever since.

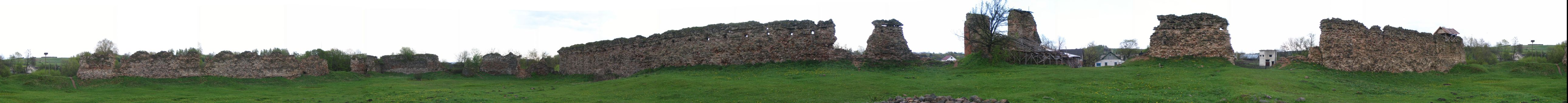
The present-day ruins of the Kreva Castle

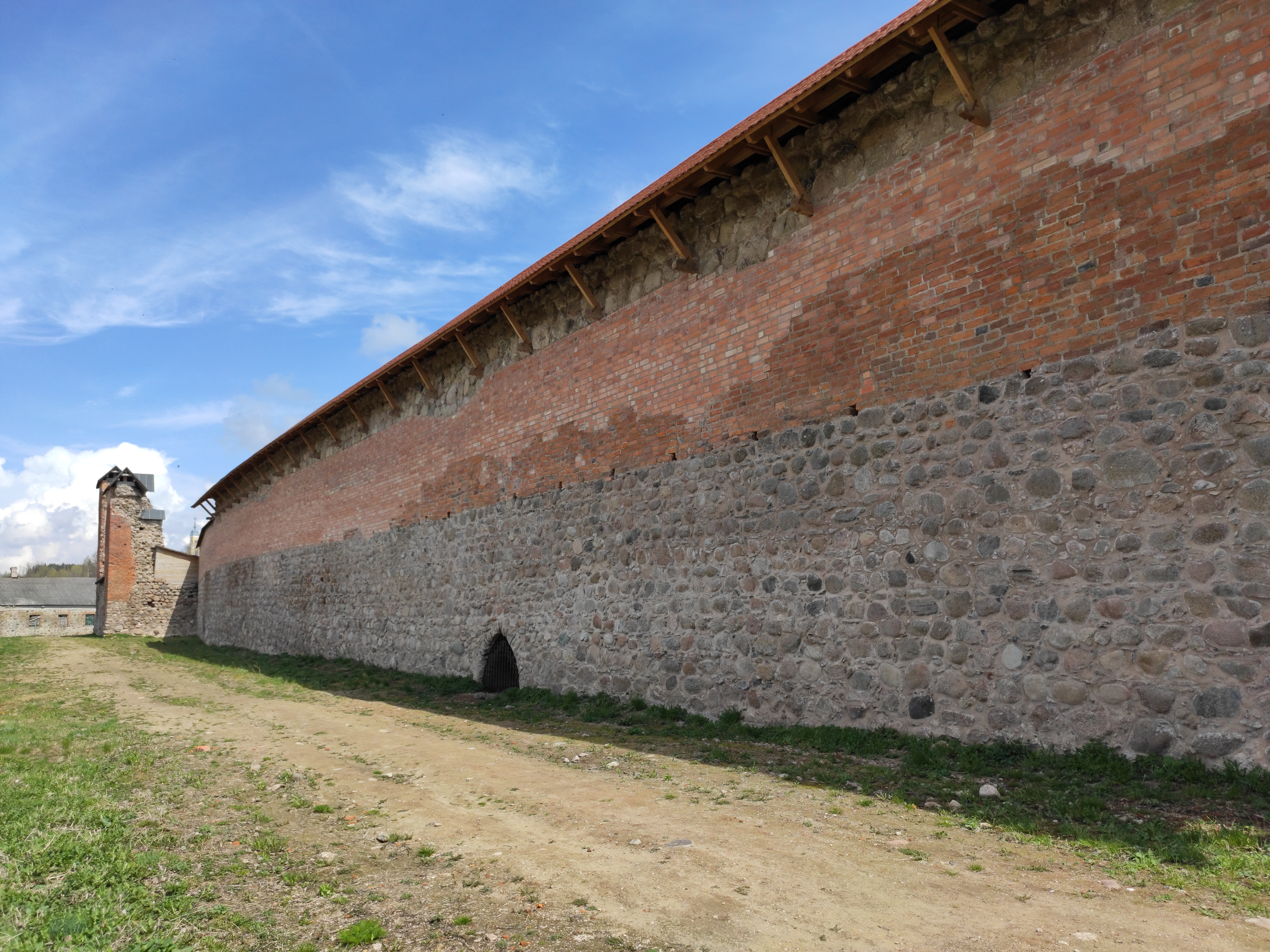
The present-day ruins of the Kreva Castle

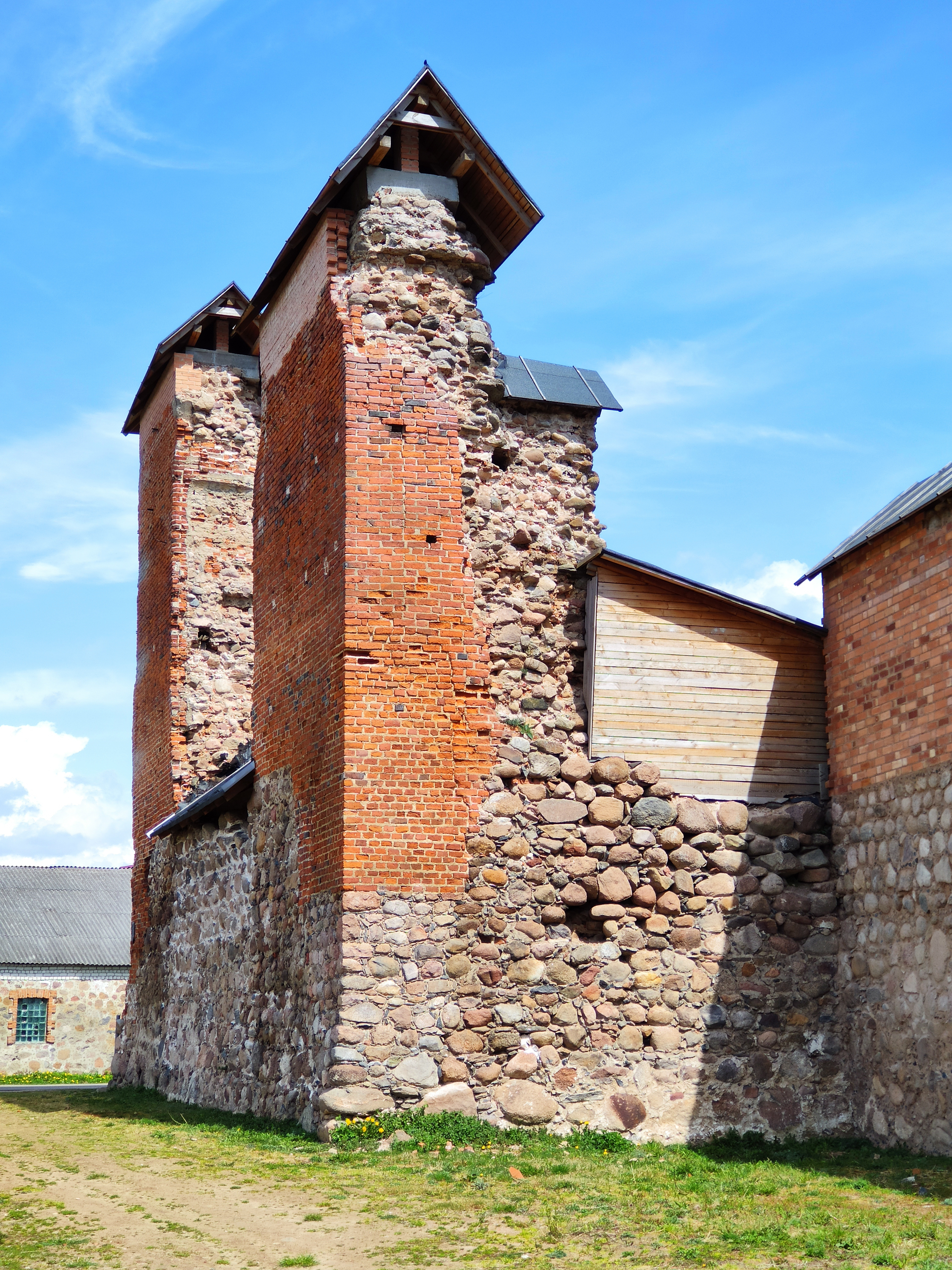
Kreva Castle Tower

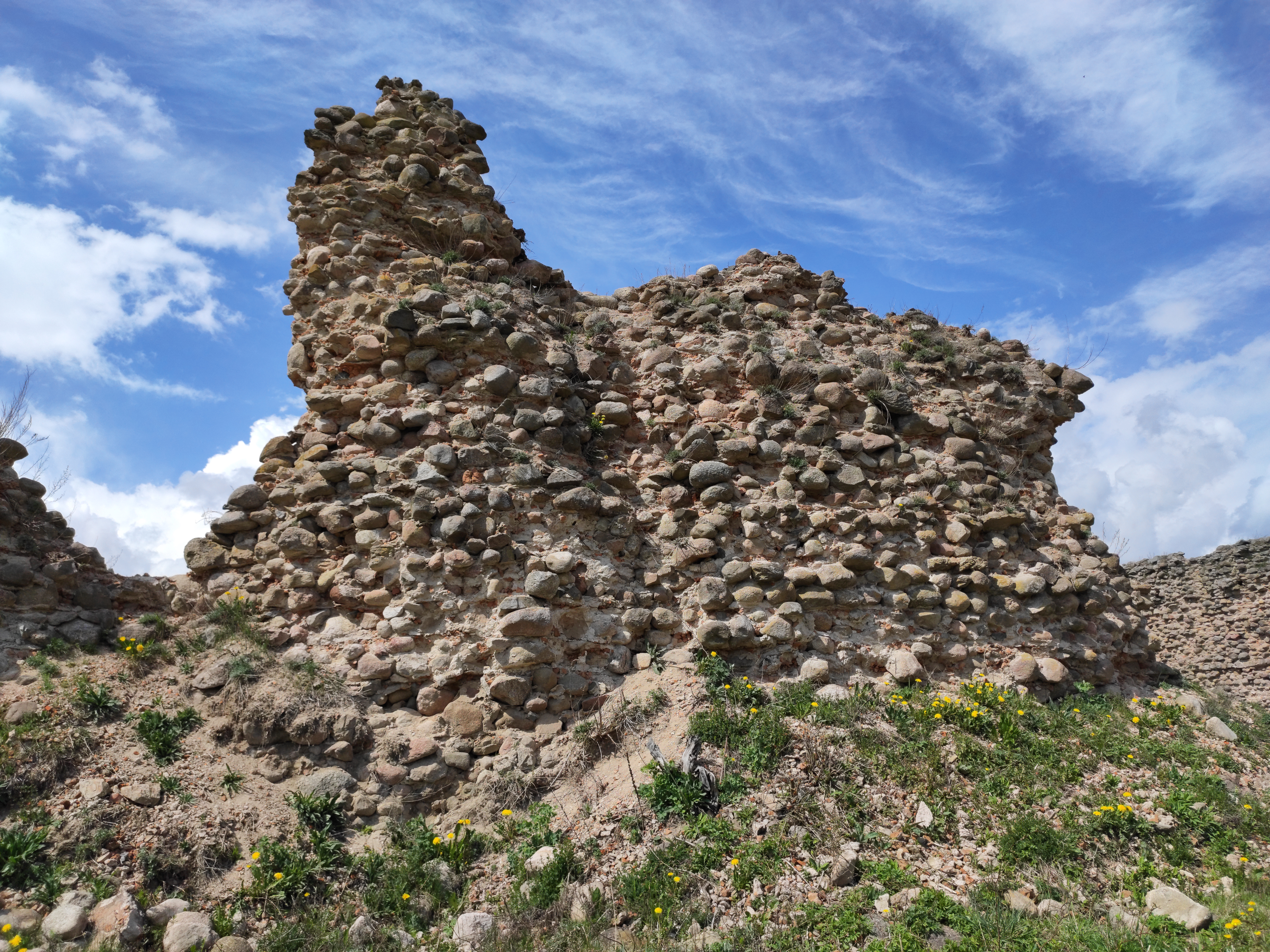
Kreva Castle Remains
