= Velyki Birky =

Rural locality in Ternopil Oblast, Ukraine

Velyki Birky Великі Бірки
- Rural settlement
- Coat of arms

- Location within Ternopil Oblast Location within Ukraine
- Coordinates: 49.5208°N 25.7536°E
- Country: Ukraine
- Oblast: Ternopil Oblast
- Raion: Ternopil Raion
- Hromada: Velyki Birky settlement hromada
- Time zone: UTC+2 (EET)
  - Summer (DST): UTC+3 (EEST)

Velyki Birky (Ukrainian: Великі Бірки) is a rural settlement in Ternopil Raion, Ternopil Oblast, Ukraine. Located on both banks of the river Hnizna Hnyla upper part of Hnizna – left tributaries of Seret, 12 km east of Ternopil. The rivers Terebna and Hnizdechna flow through the territory of the urban village – the left and right are tributaries of Hnizna Hnyla. Velyki Birky hosts the administration of Velyki Birky settlement hromada, one of the hromadas of Ukraine. Population: 3,375 (2022 estimate).

== Name ==
The modern name, Birky, comes from the ancient Slavonic word “bor”, which means pine forest. In the 15th century the village was called Borky, in the 16th-17th centuries it was called the City of Borek, in the second half of the 17th century it was called Podborye village, in the 18th-20th centuries it was called Borky Velyki, in 1967 it was known as Velyki Birky village, and finally from May 27, 1978, it was known as the urban village of Velyki Birky.

== History ==
The first documentation of the settlement was in 1410 during the reign of King Vladislav II Jogaila. The document belonged to the Polish Crown. Petro Vladkovych, the Podilskiy and Terebovlyansky village elder, confirmed the border which separated the village Chernyliv (now Cherneliv-Ruskyi) from Borek in Terebovlia on March 10, 1410. However, in the Ruskyi Chronicle a battle is mentioned which involved the Russo-Galician army and Mongols in 1243 which occurred in Borek. Therefore, this might be the first mention of Velyki Birky or the territory where it is located.

Polish sources state that in 15th-16th centuries the district of Borek along with four other surrounding villages belonged to the Terebovlya district of the Galician territories which belonged to the polish crown. On June 15, 1530, Yan Srochytsky, one of the village elders, obtained from King Sigizmund I the Elder the right to found a town based on the Magdeburg Charter in the area of the village of Borek. However, Srochytsky did not have time to found a town and was forced to give up these holdings to Mykola Senyavsky to whom the King gave the right to buy the village of Borek along with the villages of Dychkiv, Khodachkiv (later Kochava and now Malyi Khodachkiv), Haluschyntsi and Zadnyshivka (later destroyed by the Tatars). The village was in his possession close to thirty years, however Senyavsky, having obtained many other districts and become a Hetman (lord) in service to the crown, did not get attached to the village. From 1565, during the rule of King Sigizmund Augustus II, the town of Borek along with neighboring villages became the property of Mykola Pototsky, the King’s steward of the Kamianets Castle, and remained in the hands of the Pototsky family for over a century.

During the rule of the Austro-Hungarian Empire until 1918, the town belonged to the Ternopil district of the kingdom of Galicia and Lodomeria. By the end of the 18th century the town of Borek was ruled by Count Victor Zalesky and later Count Franz Vodzitsky. From the mid-19th century the village of Velyki Birky was the property of the Counties of Bavorovsky and Mitrovsky. October 22, 1849, an elementary school was founded. With the initiative of nationalists and especially Oleksander Barvinsky, one of the first reading rooms of Prosvita in the Ternopil district was founded in 1899 and lasted until 1939. Until the middle of 1914 the paramilitary organizations of Sich and Sokil were active in Velyki Birky.

During World War I from July 21, 1914, to June 25, 1917, Velyki Birky was under Russian occupation as part of the Ternopil Governance of the Galicia-Bukovina General- Governance. From November 1, 1918, to June 17, 1919, the village was part of ZUNR (Zakhidno-Ukrayinska Narodna Respublica or Western-Ukrainian People's Republic). During the Russo-Polish war of 1920, from June 26 to August 21 the village is a part of Halyts’ka Social Soviet Republic.

August 1, 1921, Velyki Birky became part of the Ternopil district as a regional center.

During the German Nazi occupation (July 2, 1941- March 21, 1944) Velyki Birky was the center of the Ternopil area, the Galicia District, General Governance, and the Third Reich.

December 4, 1939, the urban village becomes part of Ternopil Oblast of USSR. Later, from January 1, 1940, to July 2, 1941, and from March 21, 1944, to January 1, 1963, it is the center of the Velyki Birky Raion of the Ternopil Oblast. In 1963–1967 the village of Velyki Birky became part of Pidvolochysk Raion, and from January 1, 1967, till the present it is part of the Ternopil Raion.

Until 26 January 2024, Velyki Birky was designated urban-type settlement. On this day, a new law entered into force which abolished this status, and Koropets became a rural settlement.

== Castle ==
Certainly the oldest historical monument of Velyki Birky could be a defensive castle of the 16th - 17th centuries. The castle suffered damage due to repeated attacks of Tatars. In the summer of 1649 the small town of Borek and the castle were completely destroyed by the Tatars. This was during the time of the Siege of Zbarazh and the Treaty of Zboriv. The town belonged to Mykola Pototskyi, a crowned Hetman, who at one point was also a prisoner of the Tatars. What remained of the castle was a square earthen rampart, a house belonging to the steward of the lordly estate which was rebuilt in the 19th century where the old castles gate used to be. Also, deep clay cellars were left from when hundreds of people would hide during attacks. Now this area is a school and preschool.

== Railway Station ==
Between 1869 and 1871 the Carl Ludwig Galician railway company was building a rail line from L’viv to Ternopil which was intended to connect the inner regions of Austria-Hungary with the railway network of Russia. Soon between Ternopil and Pidvolochysk many new engineering, research, and building projects were started to help the laying of the railway line, altering of the course of the River Terebna, and the building of bridges which still exist today. One line of this railway network went through Velyki Birky. On Karl Ludwig’s Day, November 4, 1871, the railway connecting Ternopil to Pidvolochysk and across the Austro-Russian border to Volochysk was officially opened. A few years later, in 1875, the railway station, Birky Velyki, was built on the territory of Velyki Birky. On August 12, 1898, another, local, 47 kilometer long, railway connecting Hrymailiv to Birky Velyki was opened. During the occupation in the fall of 1941 the Organisation Todt forced the Red Army POWs to finish building a two-line railway from Ternopil to Pidvolochysk, construction of which was started in 1940. In 1998, on Independence day, a new 50-kilometer-long electrically powered network of railways between Ternopil and Pidvolochysk was opened.

== Monuments ==
- Memorial Cross in honor of the end of serfdom in Galicia and village reforms as a result of the Revolution of 1848.
- Cross in honor of the foundation of the society of sobriety in 1878 (found on the grounds of the Church of St. Paraskeva).
- On the military cemetery, where over 1,000 Red Army soldiers are buried
- A monument to Red Army soldiers who died on the territory of the Velyki Birky district, built in 1955.
- A monument to soldiers from the village who died in the Russo-Germanic war, built in 1967.
- In 1992 activists of the local chapter of the National Ukrainian Movement built a memorial, in the old cemetery, to all those who died protecting the freedom of Ukraine. It consists of two earthen mounds with crosses on top and a memorial plaque with “Here fell the sons of Ukraine for her freedom, here is our history, glory, and honor.” The left mound with a birch cross was made in memory of the fallen Ukrainian Sich Riflemen and soldiers of the UGA. The right one is the sight of the reburial of 34 imprisoned soldiers of the UPA, OUN partisans, and hostages killed by the SS in the village in 1944. The architect was Pavlo Halokha.
- On Sunday, June 14, 1995, in the center of town, a memorial to Taras Shevchenko was officially opened. It was funded by donations from the citizens as well as local companies. The sculptor was M. Nevesely. The architect was P. Halokha.
- In March 1998 on the central building of the secondary school named after Stepan Baley a memorial plaque was installed.

== Churches ==
According to historical sources, one of the first buildings of the Church of Saint Paraskeva was built in the middle of the 16th century. This building was mostly likely made of wood. Later in the 17th—18th centuries the architectural style and building materials were constantly being changed. This was primarily because during the times of the Tartar and Turkish invasions the church was constantly being damaged and even completely destroyed. But despite all the troubles the Church persistently rose from the ruins. The Church was always rebuilt in exactly the same spot. At the end of the 19th century the village community decided to build a new stone church building on the same spot as before. The church was built by the faithful parishioners, their donations and the donation of Countess Maria Mitrovska. The general construction work was completed in 1901. The church was consecrated in 1902. The Church iconostasis was painted in the twenties by the master of art of the 20th century, Antin Manastyrsky.

On December 21, 2003, the bishop of the Ternopil-Zboriv eparchy, Mykhaylo Sabryha, and Abbot Gregory Planchak of the Monastery of St. Theodor the Studite blessed the women’s monastery of the Presentation of Mary in Velyki Birky.

On 11 June 2005, the auxiliary Bishop of L’viv of the Roman Catholic Church, Leon Maly, together with Roman Catholic priests and the Pastor of the Church of St. Paraskeva, Father Vasil Mykhaylshyn, blessed the chapel of The Visitation of Elizabeth by BVM.

== Social ==
- Public School Gymnasium of Velyki Birky (named after S. Baley)
- Creative Arts Building of Velyki Birky
- Musical school
- Kindergarten and Nursery
- Cultural Center
- Central Regional Library
- Library for students and youth

== Industrial Facilities ==
Velyki Birky has many privatized industrial facilities such as a furniture factory, millwork shop, auto-body shop, mill, two bakeries, etc.

== People ==
=== Born in Velyki Birky ===
- Doctor of philosophy and medicine, professor, Academician of the Polish Academy of Sciences, Stepan-Maksym Baley (1885–1952)
- Member of the Prosvita Organization, head of UHA, secretary of the Ukrainian Canadian Legion (Toronto, Canada), Petro Bigus (1882–1966)
- Teacher and public figure, a delegate in UNR and ZUNR, chairman of the Ternopil Regional Revkom, Zamora Fedir Pavlovych (1887–1937)
- Priest- of the Ukrainian Greek-Catholic Church, poet and playwright, author of works on religious themes, Yevhen Matseliukh (1893–1972)
- Polish and Soviet General, Stepan Zhydek (1900–1970)
- Polish Slavic Linguist, doctor of philology sciences, professor, Karol Dejna (1911–2004)
- Ukrainian navy captain, involved during the Capture of Southern Naval Base, Yuriy Fedash (born 1980)
- Long-term prisoner of Stalin’s camps, priest of the underground Church, doctor of philosophy, Yevhen Kravchuk (1912–1992)
- Chairman of the League of Women Liberation of Ukraine (Canada), Maria Solonynka (1912–1982)
- Honorary president of Ukrainian Union of America, Kateryna Peleshok (1898–1981)
- Polish military historian, Colonel Antoniy Karpinsky (1924–2004)
- Head of the Ukrainian Military-Medical Academy, honorary doctor of Ukraine, doctor of medical studies, professor, surgeon-general of medical services, Volodymyr Pasko (born in 1946)
- Vice Minister of Internal Affairs of Ukraine, Vasyl Fatkhutdinov (born in 1956)

=== Grew Up in Velyki Birky ===
- Yosyp Stadnyk - famous Ukrainian actor, director and activist of the theater (in 1890-1894)
- Volodymyr Gavlich (1913–1981) - priest, public activist.
- Stephan Shumeyko (1893-1952) - lawyer, editor. and community leader Ukrainian-American.

=== Spent Time in Velyki Birky ===
- Symon Petliura - Chief chieftain of the troops УНР (June 2–4, 1919)
- Antin Manastyrsky - artist
- Platon Voronko - poet (1943)
- Ihor Gereta - conducted archaeological research (1987)
- Oleksander Pokryshkin - the first three-time hero of the Soviet Union
- Oleksandr Tkachenko - 1982-1985
- Leonid Kravchuk - the first president of Ukraine (1994)
- National deputies of Ukraine: Les Taniuk (1998), Stepan Khmara (1999), Ihor Tarasiuk (2002), Ukrainian politician - Yuriy Shukhevych (1999), Blessed cardinal - Lubomyr Husar (2002)
