= Borky Castle =

Castle in Velyki Birky, Ternopil Oblast, Ukraine

- Борецький замок
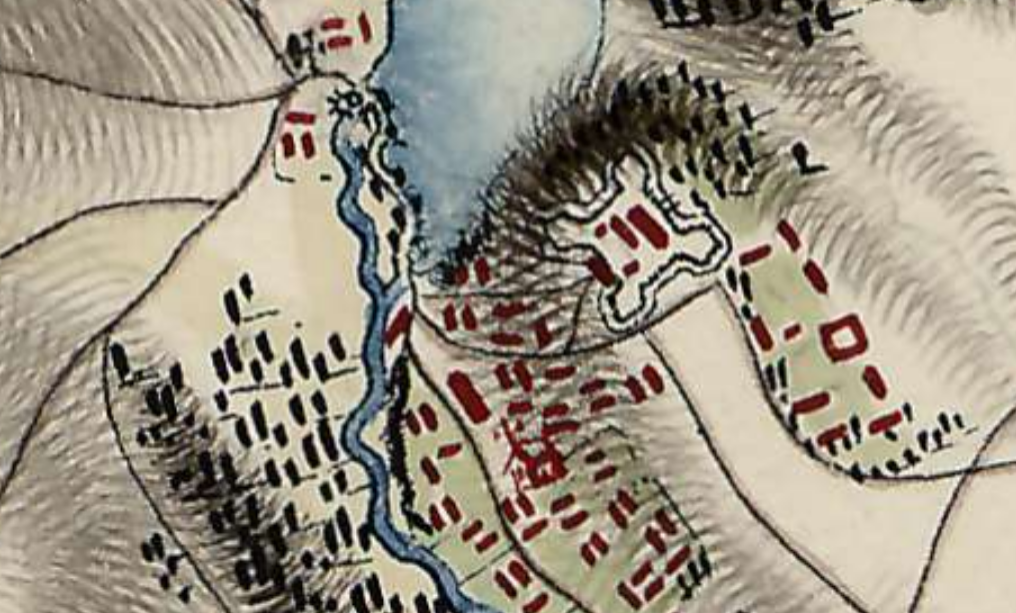
- Borky Castle on the map by Friedrich von Mieg, 18th century
- Interactive map of the Borky Castle area

General information
- Location: Velyki Birky, Ternopil Raion, Ternopil Oblast, Ukraine
- Coordinates: 49°30′56″N 25°45′27″E

The Borky Castle (Ukrainian: Борецький замок, romanized: Borets'kyi zamok) is a lost defensive castle of the 16th–19th centuries in Velyki Birky, Ternopil Oblast, which could have been the oldest historical monument of the town.

== Topography ==
In the 16th century, Borky Castle had high rough walls made of oak logs that surrounded and locked inside residential and outbuildings and four bastions that were placed on the cardinal points, with rows of loopholes at the corners. On the southwestern side, there was an entrance gate reinforced by earthen ramparts, the remains of which survived until the 50s of the 20th century.

The castle was built on top of a 326-meter-high flat hill, which until the late 1930s was called Ohrudek. The left bank of the Terebna River at the foot of the hill was formed by a steep, overgrown with shrubs, a slope which is still called Krucha. The valleys of the Terebna and Hnizna Hnyla rivers, which merge at that point, created a heavily swampy impassable area. With the construction of the dam, the road to which arched from the entrance gate of the castle to the water mill, a large pond was spilling here. The castle was surrounded by a long, deep ravine on the northeast side, which made it difficult to approach. Only from the southeastern direction there was an open flat area. A few kilometers from this place, on the ground that constituted a distinct barrier, deep trenches were dug, reinforced by a raft of thick logs, from which the modern name of the tract comes – Za Shantsiamy. This is how the Jesuit missionaries who visited Ternopil in 1608 on their way to Kamianets saw Borky Castle.

The castle was repeatedly destroyed by Tatar attacks and rebuilt more than once. When laying the foundations of residential buildings on Haharina Street (adjacent to the former castle) in 1970–1980, developers came across traces of fires, fragments of cold steel, arrowheads, Cossack clay pipes, and other artifacts, but they were lost because no archaeological excavations were carried out there.

== History ==
On 9 July 1643, Aleksander Koniecpolski, the son of the great crown hetman Stanisław Koniecpolski, visited the ailing Mikołaj Potocki in Borky Castle for consultations on military matters.

In the summer of 1649, during the Zbarazh siege and as a result of the articles of the Treaty of Zboriv, it, along with the town of Borek, which belonged to the great crown hetman Mikołaj Potocki, was destroyed to the ground.

According to the act of lustration of the estates of Mikołaj Potocki (a descendant of Mikołaj Potocki, royal mayor, owner of a complex of estates called the Boretska state) in 1661–1664, a description of what remained of the castle is given: "The castle in Borek is surrounded by a rampart, but it was destroyed by the enemies. But there is a gate in which there is a chamber with a room. There is an oven there. There is also a good crypt for storing drinks. Other houses were destroyed and demolished. There is a wicker stable in the castle...".

At the end of the seventeenth century, Borky Castle was rebuilt along with the town of Borek. With the cessation of Tatar raids (Treaty of Karlowitz), at the beginning of the eighteenth century Borky Castle lost its importance as a defensive structure. Therefore, in the eighteenth century Borky Castle was rebuilt as a so-called stone "fortification" – the yard of a wealthy nobleman surrounded by a quadrangular wall, moat, and rampart with a palisade, fortified at the corners with stone towers, and a defensive entrance gate. With the formation of the Borek starosta, the castle became the seat of the starosta.

On 19 August 1759, Lieutenant-General Michał-Stanisław Graf Korwin Kamiński, the headman of Borek and manager of the estate, granted an erection charter in Borek Castle authorizing the establishment of a parish in the neighboring village of Dychkiv and an act of granting land to the Church of the Archangel Michael in Khodachkiv. Over time, the owners of the castle changed. The last of those to receive the Borek Kingdom along with the Borek starosta for life was Graf Wiktoryn Zaleski, a castellan.

After the first partition of Poland, Galicia became part of the Habsburg monarchy, and the kingdom with its starosta was abolished, so in 1784 Wiktoryn Zaleski was forced to buy the castle with the town of Borky from the Galician governorate and take it into his ownership.

The map of the Austrian military cartographer Friedrich von Mieg Koenigsreiches Galizien und Lodomerien 1779–1782 clearly shows the outlines of Borky Castle with four bastions connected by a solid wall.

The owner of the castle and the town of Borky, Graf Wiktoryn Zaleski (1765–1796), and its subsequent owners, Graf Adam Starzeński (1796–1825) and Graf Franz Wodzicki (1825–1840), did not live there permanently and gradually lost the need for it. The castle ceased to be the estate of its owner and began to gradually decay. Under the next owners, the Grafs Baworowski and their descendants, the castle ceased to exist. Instead, several brick houses appeared, which served as the administration of the manor and were the temporary estate of the estate owners.

In the last quarter of the nineteenth century, Austrian military topographic maps of the territory of Velyki Birky still showed the conventional designation Schl from the German Schloss, which means a castle, palace, or estate without defensive fortifications. In 1896, the priest Petro Bilynskyi noted: "There is no trace of the castle anymore, only very long beer pits dug in hard clay that are still in quite good condition. There is also the house of the butler (the estate manager's residence), which was converted from the former gate and is still called the gatehouse. During the time of serfdom, a mandator (a police and judicial officer in the countryside in Austria until 1848) lived there, and in the basement there was an arrest (a basement stone room for temporary detainees). An earthen quadrangular rampart is still well known around the place where the castle used to be...".
