= Jadwiga and Jagiełło Monument =

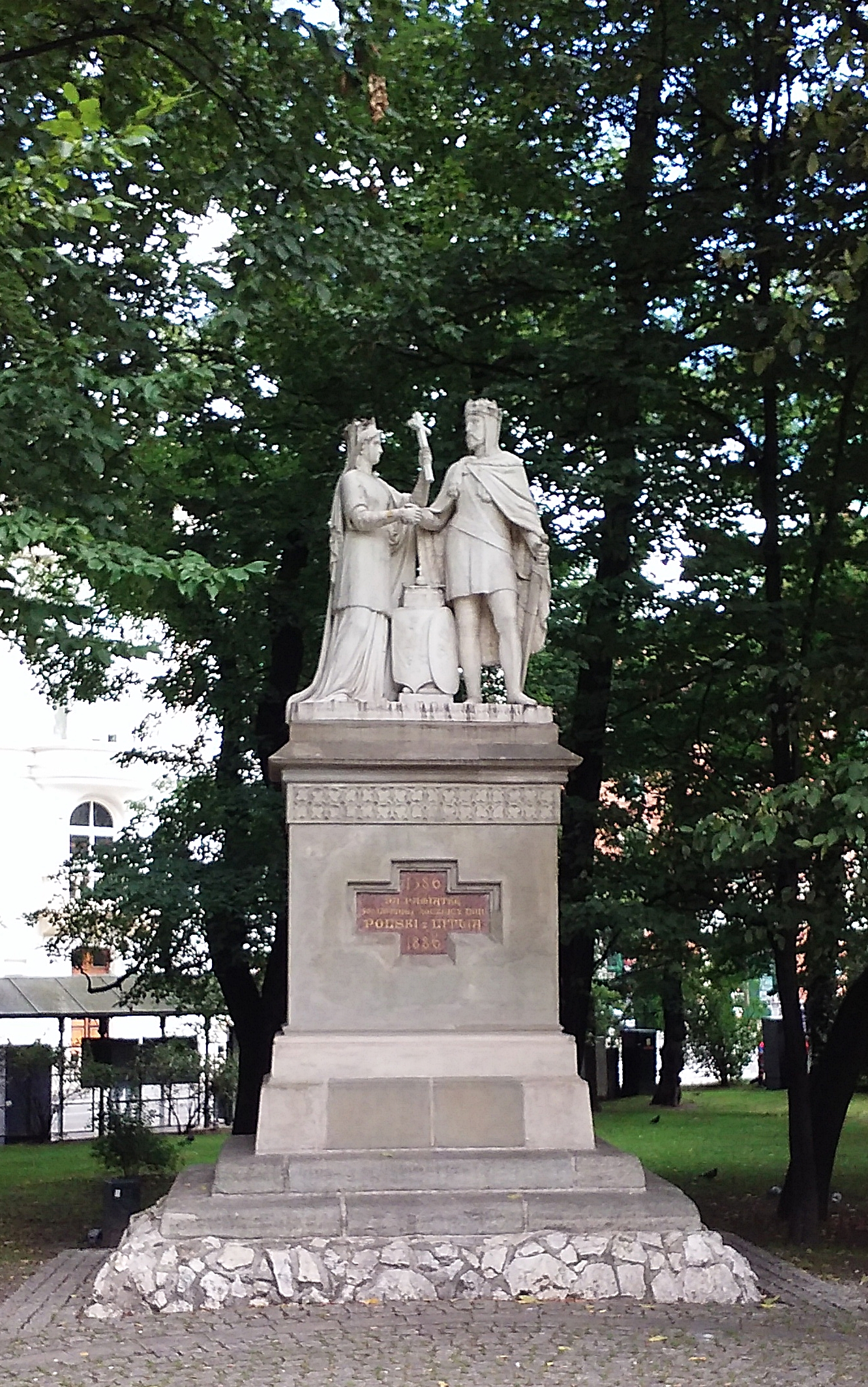
- Interactive map of Jadwiga and Jagiełło Monument
- Location: Kraków, Poland
- Coordinates: 50°03′57″N 19°56′19″E
- Material: Carrara marble
- Opening date: 1 September 1886
- Dedicated to: Polish-Lithuanian union

The Jadwiga and Jagiełło Monument (Polish: Pomnik Jadwigi i Jagiełły) is a Gothic monument in Kraków, in the northern part of Planty at Basztowa Street, commemorating the 500th anniversary of the Polish-Lithuanian union. Founded by Tomasz Oskar Sosnowski, it depicts Queen Jadwiga of Poland and Władysław II Jagiełło at the moment of their nuptials. Made of Carrara marble, decorated with the coats of arms of Poland and Lithuania, it was unveiled in 1886. The whole is decorated with a Latin inscription and a plaque commemorating the union of 1386.

The monument is one of the examples of 19th century monumental art, combining a commemorative function with reference to historical events. Situated on a small hill, integrated into the greenery of the Planty, it is an important element of Kraków's urban landscape. With its marble sculptures and symbolism of coats of arms and inscriptions, the monument recalls the importance of the Polish-Lithuanian Union in building the power of the Polish-Lithuanian Commonwealth. Since its unveiling, it has been renovated several times, which testifies to the constant concern for its preservation as a historical heritage.
