= Władysław II Jagiełło =

Grand Duke of Lithuania (1377–1434); King of Poland (1386–1434)

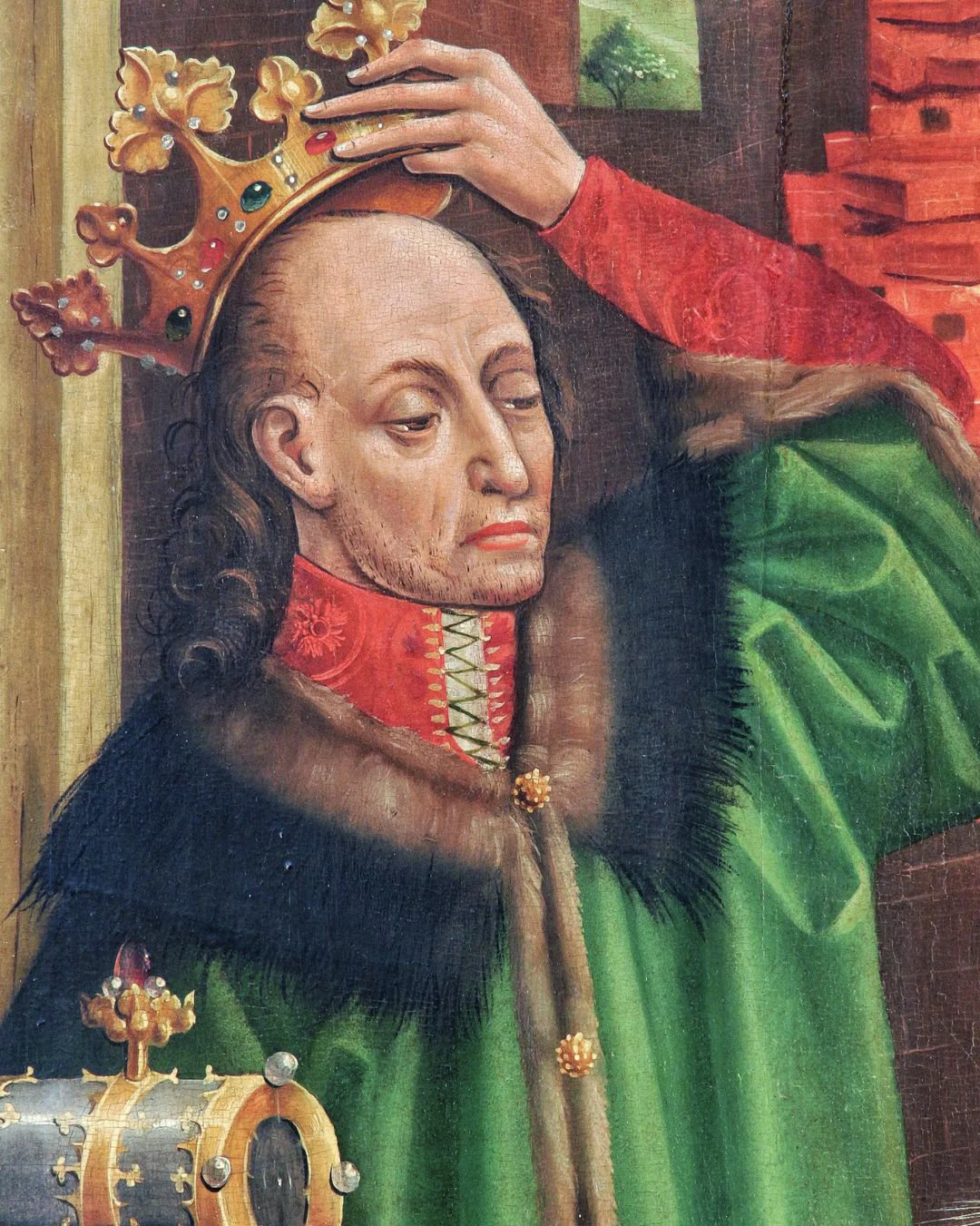
- King Władysław II Jagiełło, detail of the Triptych of Our Lady of Sorrows in the Wawel Cathedral

Grand/Supreme Duke of Lithuania
- Reign: May 1377 – August 1381; 3/15 August 1382 – 1 June 1434
- Predecessor: Algirdas (1377); Kęstutis (1382)
- Successor: Kęstutis (1381); Władysław and Sigismund Kęstutaitis (1434)
- Regents: Skirgaila (1386–1392); Vytautas (1392–1401)
- Co-rulers (Grand dukes): Vytautas (1401–1430); Švitrigaila (1430–1432); Sigismund Kęstutaitis (1432–1434)

King of Poland
- Reign: 2 February 1386 – 1 June 1434
- Coronation: 4 March 1386
- Predecessor: Jadwiga
- Successor: Władysław III
- Co-ruler: Jadwiga (1386–1399)
- Born: c. 1352/1362; Vilnius, then part of Grand Duchy of Lithuania
- Died: 1 June 1434 (aged around 71/82); Gródek Jagielloński, then part of Kingdom of Poland
- Burial: Wawel Cathedral
- Spouses: Jadwiga of Poland; Anna of Cilli; Elizabeth of Pilica; Sophia of Halshany
- Issue: Elizabeth Bonifacia Jagiellon; Hedwig Jagiellon; Władysław III of Poland; Casimir Jagiellon; Casimir IV Jagiellon
- Dynasty: Jagiellon (cadet branch of the Gediminid dynasty)
- Father: Algirdas, Grand Duke of Lithuania
- Mother: Uliana of Tver
- Religion: Lithuanian polytheism (c. 1352/1362–1386); Catholic (1386–1434)

Jogaila (Lithuanian: [jɔˈɡâːɪɫɐ]; c. 1352/1362 – 1 June 1434), later Władysław II Jagiełło (Polish: [vwaˈdɨswaf jaˈɡʲɛwwɔ]), (Note: Other names include (Lithuanian: Jogaila Algirdaitis; Belarusian: Ягайла, romanized: Jagajła) (see also Names and titles of Władysław II Jagiełło)) was Grand Duke of Lithuania beginning in 1377 and King of Poland from 1386 until his death. As Grand Duke, he ruled Lithuania from 1377 to 1381 and from 1382 to 1401, at which time he became the Supreme Duke of Lithuania in exchange for naming his cousin Vytautas as the new Grand Duke. Władysław II initially served as King of Poland alongside his wife Jadwiga until her death in 1399, and then the sole ruler until his own death in 1434.

Raised a Lithuanian polytheist, he converted to Catholicism in 1386 and baptized as Ladislaus (Polish: Władysław) in Kraków, married the young Queen Jadwiga, and was crowned King of Poland as Władysław II Jagiełło. In 1387, he converted Lithuania to Catholicism. His sole reign in Poland started in 1399, upon the death of Queen Jadwiga, lasted a further thirty-five years, and laid the foundation for the centuries-long Polish–Lithuanian union. He was a member of the Jagiellonian dynasty in Poland that bears his name and was previously also known as the Gediminid dynasty in the Grand Duchy of Lithuania. The dynasty ruled both states until 1572, (Note: Anna Jagiellon, the last member of the royal Jagiellon family, died in 1596.) and became one of the most influential dynasties in late medieval and early modern Europe.

Jogaila was the last pagan ruler of medieval Lithuania. After he became King of Poland, as a result of the Union of Krewo, the newly formed Polish-Lithuanian union confronted the growing power of the Teutonic Order. The allied victory at the Battle of Grunwald in 1410, followed by the Peace of Thorn, secured the Polish and Lithuanian borders and marked the emergence of the Polish–Lithuanian alliance as a significant force in Europe. The reign of Władysław II Jagiełło extended Polish frontiers and is often considered the beginning of Poland's Golden Age.

== Early life ==
=== Family ===
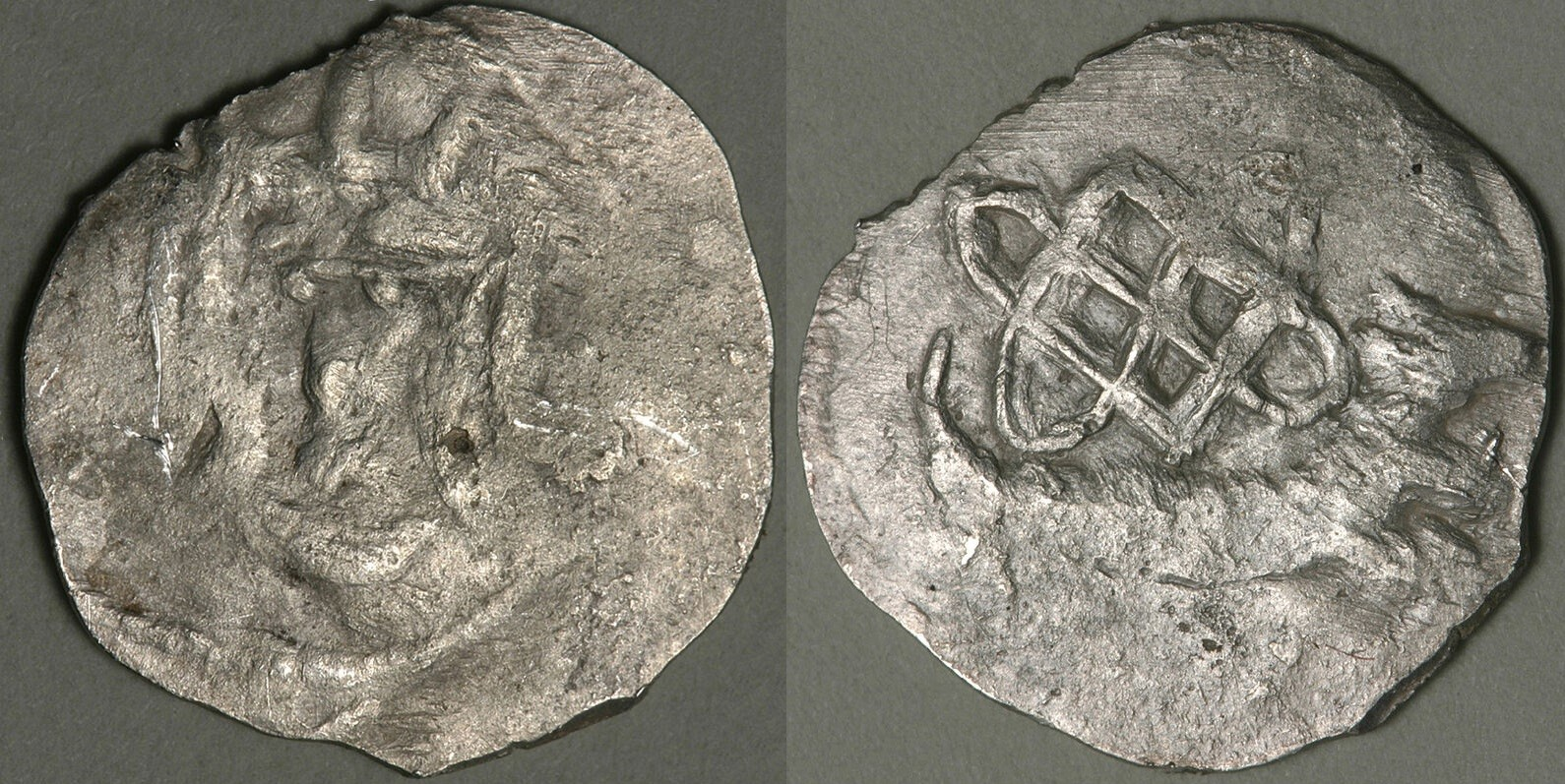
Early coin of the Grand Duke of Lithuania Jogaila with a lion, minted at the Vilnius Mint between 1386 and 1387

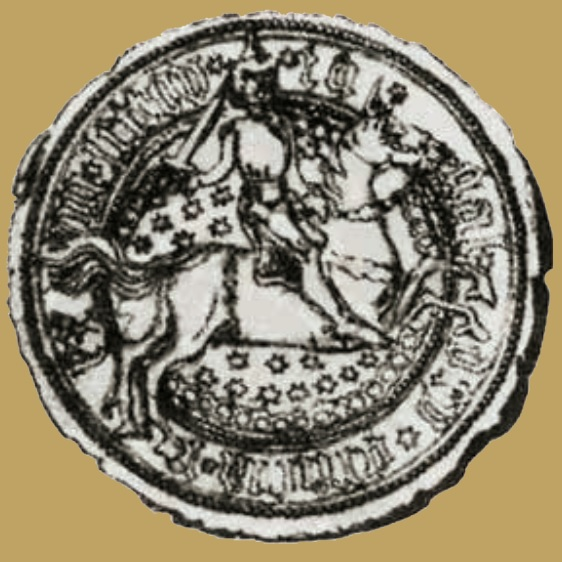
Seal of Władysław II Jagiełło with his title (in Latin) as King in Lithuania, used in 1377–1386, before becoming the King of Poland in 1386

Little is known of Jogaila's early life, and even his year of birth is uncertain. Previously, historians assumed he was born around 1352, but some recent research suggests a later date — about 1362. He was the son of Algirdas, Grand Duke of Lithuania of the Gediminid dynasty, and his second wife, Uliana of Tver, who was the daughter of the Yaroslavichi prince Aleksandr of Tver. Joagaila's name had a meaning of more courageous and superior than others. The young Prince spent most of his early time in Vilnius, at his father's manor.

Jogaila was designated by his father to be his heir (replacing his older half-brother Fiodor in that role) and ascended the Lithuanian throne after Algirdas's death in 1377. Depending on which year he was born with, he was either around 14 or 24 years old at the time of becoming the Grand Duke. The former possibility is supported by the fact during Jogaila's early reign his mother Uliana of Tver acted as regent; additionally, Vytautas the Great in his Memorial noted that his father Kęstutis (Algirdas's brother) ruled over Lithuania "until he [Jogaila] grew up and people get used to him", which suggests Jogaila would have been very young and presumably underaged – therefore in his teens rather than 20s – when he had come to the throne.

=== First years as Grand Duke ===
The Grand Duchy of Lithuania, over which Jogaila ruled, was a political entity composed of two leading, but very different nationalities and two political systems: ethnic Lithuania in the northwest and the vast Ruthenian territories of former Kievan Rus', comprising the lands of modern Ukraine, Belarus, and parts of western Russia. At first, the young Grand Duke — like his father — based his rule in the southern and eastern territories of Lithuania, while his uncle, Kęstutis, the Duke of Trakai, continued to rule the north-western region. (Note: Some historians have called this system a diarchy (Sruogienė-Sruoga 1987; Deveike 1950). However, Rowell suggests that the nature of this dual rule "[...] reflects political expediency; it certainly does not meet the formal definition of diarchy as "rule by two independent authorities" [...] those two leaders were not equal: the grand duke in Vilnius was supreme" (Rowell 1994, p. 68).) Jagiełło's succession, however, soon placed this system of dual rule under strain.

At the start of his reign, Jogaila was preoccupied with unrest in the Lithuanian Rus' lands. In 1377–1378, Andrei of Polotsk, the eldest son of Algirdas, challenged Władysław II Jagiełło's authority and sought to become Grand Duke. In 1380, Andrei and another brother, Demetrius I Starshy, sided with Prince Dmitri Donskoi against Jogaila's alliance with emir Mamai, de facto khan of the Golden Horde. Jagiełło failed to support Mamai, lingering in the vicinity of the battlefield, which led to Mamai's army's significant defeat at the hands of Prince Dmitri in the Battle of Kulikovo. The Muscovites' Pyrrhic victory over the Golden Horde, in the long term, signified, however, the beginning of a slow climb to power by the Grand Duchy of Moscow, which became within a century the most serious rival and threat to the integrity, well-being and survival of Lithuania. However, in 1380, Muscovy was greatly weakened by tremendous losses suffered during the battle and thus, in the same year, Jagiełło was free to begin a struggle for supremacy with Kęstutis.

In the northwest, Lithuania faced constant armed incursions from the Teutonic Knights — founded after 1226 to fight and convert the pagan Baltic tribes of Prussians, Yotvingians and Lithuanians. In 1380, Jagiełło concluded the secret Treaty of Dovydiškės, directed against Kęstutis. When Kęstutis discovered the plan, the Lithuanian Civil War began. He seized Vilnius, overthrew Jogaila, and pronounced himself the Grand Duke in his place. In 1382, Jogaila raised an army from his father's vassals and confronted Kęstutis near Trakai. Kęstutis and his son Vytautas entered Jagiełło's encampment for negotiations but were tricked and imprisoned in the Kreva Castle, where Kęstutis was found dead, probably murdered, a week later. Vytautas escaped to the Teutonic fortress of Marienburg and was baptised there under the name Wigand.

Jogaila formulated the Treaty of Dubysa, which rewarded the Knights for their aid in defeating Kęstutis and Vytautas by promising Christianisation and granting them Samogitia west of the Dubysa river. However, when Jagiełło failed to ratify the treaty, the Knights invaded Lithuania in the summer of 1383. In 1384, Jogaila reconciled with Vytautas, promising to return his patrimony in Trakai. Vytautas then turned against the Knights, attacking and looting several Prussian castles.

It is known that Jagiełło, being ethnic Lithuanian in the male line, himself knew and spoke in the Lithuanian language with Vytautas, his cousin from the Gediminids dynasty. Also, during the Christianisation of Samogitia, none of the clergy, who came to Samogitia with Jogaila, were able to communicate with the natives, therefore the Grand Duke himself taught the Samogitians about the Catholicism, thus he was able to communicate in the Samogitian dialect of the Lithuanian language. According to the Teutonic Order's testimonial, he could not read nor write, and had to listen to others reading for him.

=== Baptism and marriage ===
Jogaila's Russian mother Uliana of Tver urged him to marry Sofia, daughter of Prince Dmitri of Moscow, who required him first to convert to Orthodoxy. (Note: The historian John Meyendorff suggests Jogaila may have already been an Orthodox Christian: "In 1377, Olgerd of Lithuania died, leaving the Grand Principality to his son Jagiello, an Orthodox Christian..." (Meyendorff 1989, p. 205). Dmitri, however, made it a condition of the marriage that Jogaila "should be baptised in the Orthodox faith and that he should proclaim his Christianity to all men" (Dvornik 1992, p. 221).) That option, however, was unlikely to halt the crusades against Lithuania by the Teutonic Knights, who regarded Orthodox Christians as schismatics and little better than heathens. Władysław II Jagiełło chose therefore to accept a Polish proposal to become a Catholic and marry then-eleven-year-old Queen Jadwiga of Poland. (Note: Jadwiga had actually been crowned king of Poland (rex poloni), because the Polish political system made no provision for a queen regnant (Stone 2001, p. 8).) The nobles of Lesser Poland made this offer to Władysław II Jagiełło for many reasons. They wanted to neutralise the dangers posed by Lithuania itself and to secure the fertile territories of Galicia–Volhynia. The Polish nobles saw the offer as an opportunity for increasing their privileges and avoiding Austrian influence, brought by Jadwiga's previous fiancé William, Duke of Austria.

On 14 August 1385 in Kreva Castle, Jagiełło confirmed his prenuptial promises in the Union of Krewo (Union of Kreva). The promises included the adoption of Christianity, repatriation of lands "stolen" from Poland by its neighbours, and terras suas Lithuaniae et Russiae Coronae Regni Poloniae perpetuo applicare, a clause interpreted by historians to mean anything from a personal union between Lithuania and Poland to a complete incorporation of Lithuania into Poland. The agreement at Kreva has been described both as far-sighted and as a desperate gamble. (Note: It "reflects the exceptional far-sightedness of the political elites ruling both countries" (Kłoczowski 2000, p. 55). It was "a desperate gamble by Władysław II Jagiełło to avert a seemingly inevitable subjugation" (Lukowski & Zawadzki 2001, p. 38))

Jogaila was officially elected as King on 2 February 1386 in Lublin. He was duly baptised at the Wawel Cathedral in Kraków on 15 February 1386 and from then on formally used the name "Władysław" or Latin versions of it. (Note: A Slavic name that roughly translates as glorious rule, Władysław is often Latinised into either Wladislaus or Ladislaus. The choice evoked both Władysław I Łokietek, who was Queen Jadwiga's great-grandfather and unified the kingdom in 1320, and Saint Ladislaus I of Hungary, a king who sided with the pope against the emperor Henry IV and Christianised Transylvania (Rowell 2000, pp. 709–712).) The marriage took place three days later, and on 4 March 1386, Władysław II Jagiełło was crowned the King of Poland by archbishop de Gniezno Bodzanta. He was the first Lithuanian to be crowned Polish monarch. The royal baptism triggered the conversion of most of Jogaila's court and noblemen, as well as mass baptisms in Lithuanian rivers, a beginning of the final Christianization of Lithuania. Though the ethnic Lithuanian nobility were the main converts to Catholicism — both paganism and the Orthodox rite remained strong among the peasants — the king's conversion and its political implications created lasting repercussions for the history of both Lithuania and Poland. On 22 February 1387, he banned Catholics from marriages with Orthodox and demanded those Orthodox who previously married with the Catholics to convert to Catholicism.

== Ruler of Lithuania and Poland ==
=== Co-ruler with Jadwiga ===
==== Ascension ====
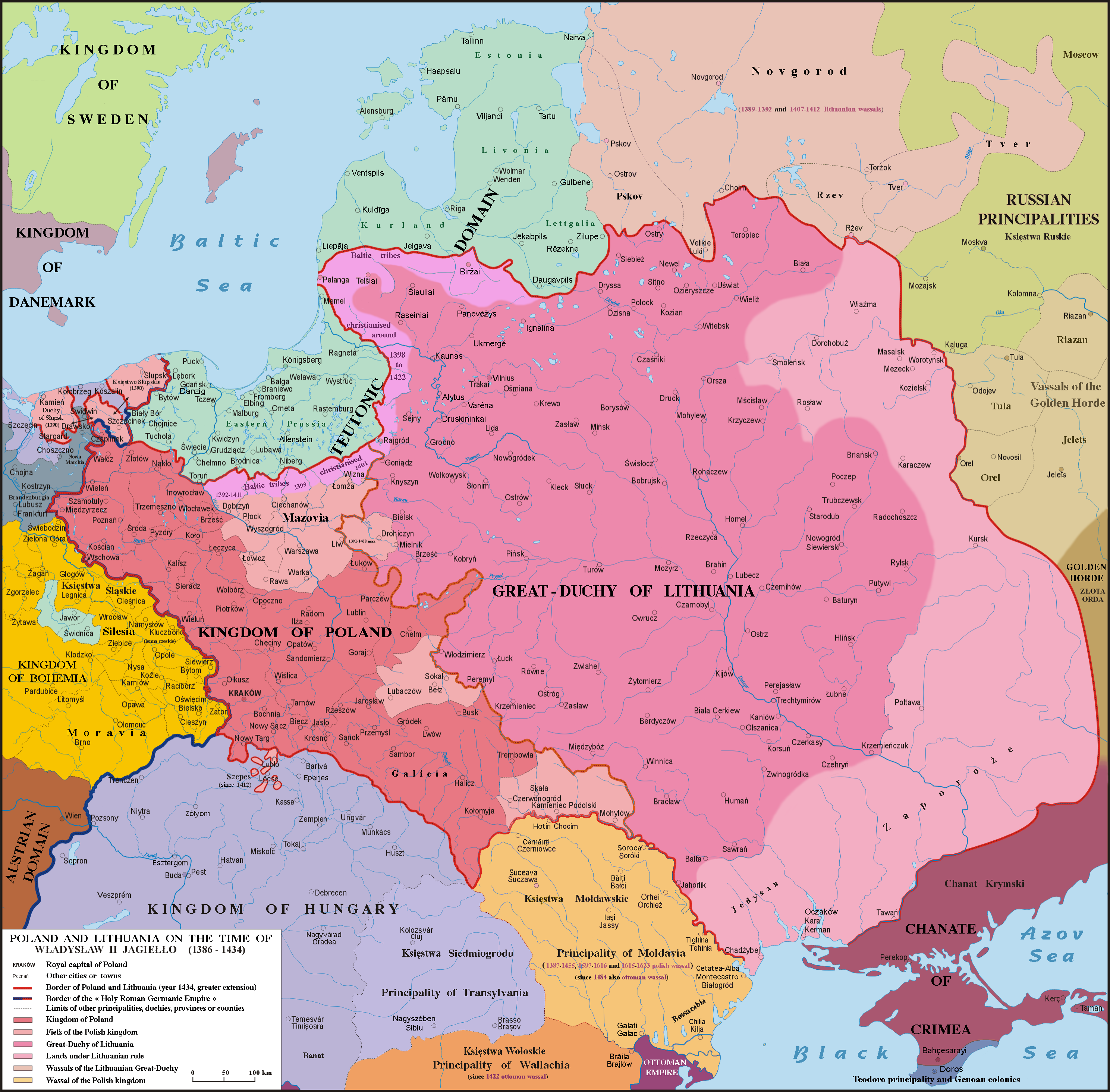
Poland and Lithuania 1386–1434

Władysław II Jagiełło reigned in Poland as co-monarch with his wife, whose role was not degraded following their marriage. After matured, Jadwiga took an active part in Poland's cultural and political life, and is described as having been "hardheaded politician" who was engaging in diplomacy with the Teutonic Order as well as Sigismund of Luxembourg (her brother-in-law) and Vytautas. In 1387, she led two successful military expeditions to Red Ruthenia, recovered lands her father, Louis I of Hungary, had transferred from Poland to Hungary, and secured the homage of Voivode Peter I of Moldavia. Most political responsibilities, however, fell to Jagiello, with Jadwiga attending to the cultural and charitable activities for which she is still revered.

Soon after Jagiello acceded to the Polish throne, Jagiello granted Vilnius a city charter like that of Kraków, modelled on the Magdeburg Law; and Vytautas issued a privilege to a Jewish commune of Trakai on almost the same terms as privileges issued to the Jews of Poland in the reigns of Bolesław the Pious and Casimir the Great. Władysław II's policy of unifying the two legal systems was partial and uneven at first but achieved a lasting influence. By the time of the Union of Lublin in 1569, there was not much difference between the administrative and judicial systems in force in Lithuania and Poland.

One effect of Jagiello's measures was to be the advancement of Catholics in Lithuania at the expense of Orthodox elements; in 1387 and 1413, for example, Lithuanian Catholic boyars were granted special judicial and political privileges denied to the Orthodox boyars. As this process gained momentum, it was accompanied by the rise of both Rus' and Lithuanian identity in the fifteenth century.

==== Challenges ====
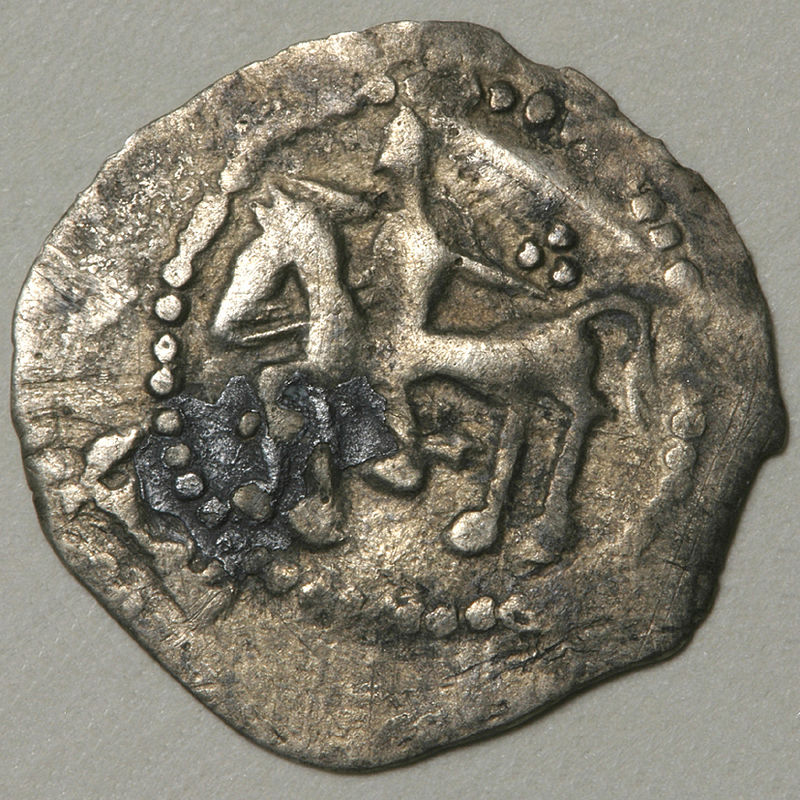
Lithuanian Denar of Jogaila (minted in 1388–1392) with Vytis (Pahonia)

Jagiełło's baptism failed to end the crusade of the Teutonic Knights, who claimed his conversion was a sham, perhaps even heresy, and renewed their incursions on the pretext that pagans remained in Lithuania. From then on, however, the Order found it harder to sustain the cause of a crusade and faced the growing threat to its existence posed by the Kingdom of Poland and a genuinely Christian Lithuania alliance. Władysław II sponsored the creation of the diocese of Vilnius under bishop Andrzej Wasilko, the former confessor of Elizabeth of Poland. The bishopric, which included Samogitia, then largely controlled by the Teutonic Order, was subordinated to the see of Gniezno and not to that of Teutonic Königsberg. The decision may not have improved Władysław's relations with the Order, but it served to introduce closer ties between Lithuania and Poland, enabling the Polish church to freely assist its Lithuanian counterpart.

In 1389, Władysław's rule in Lithuania faced a revived challenge from Vytautas, who resented the power given to Skirgaila in Lithuania at the expense of his own patrimony. Vytautas started a civil war in Lithuania, aiming to become the Grand Duke. On 4 September 1390, the joint forces of Vytautas and Grand Master Konrad von Wallenrode of the Teutonic Order laid siege to Vilnius, which was held by Władysław II's regent Skirgaila with combined Polish, Lithuanian and Ruthenian troops. Although the Knights lifted the siege of the castle after a month, they reduced much of the outer city to ruins. This bloody conflict was eventually brought to a temporary halt in 1392 with the Treaty of Ostrów, by which Władysław handed over the government of Lithuania to his cousin in exchange for peace: Vytautas was to rule Lithuania as the grand duke (magnus dux) until his death, under the overlordship of the Supreme Duke (dux supremus) in the person of the Polish monarch. Skirgaila was moved from the Duchy of Trakai to become prince of Kiev. Vytautas initially accepted his status but soon began to pursue Lithuania's independence from Poland.

The protracted period of war between the Lithuanians and the Teutonic Knights was ended on 12 October 1398 by the Treaty of Salynas, named after the islet in the Neman River where it was signed. Lithuania agreed to cede Samogitia and assist the Teutonic Order in a campaign to seize Pskov, while the Order agreed to assist Lithuania in a campaign to seize Novgorod. Shortly afterwards, Vytautas was crowned as a king by local nobles; but the following year his forces and those of his ally, Khan Tokhtamysh of the White Horde, were crushed by the Timurids at the Battle of the Vorskla River, ending his imperial ambitions in the east and obliging him to submit to Władysław's protection once more.

=== Sole king ===
==== Early actions ====
On 22 June 1399, Jadwiga gave birth to a daughter, baptised Elizabeth Bonifacia, but within a month the mother and daughter died, leaving Władysław II sole ruler of the Kingdom of Poland, with no heir or much legitimacy to rule the kingdom. Jadwiga's death undermined Władysław II's right to the throne, and as a result, old conflicts between the nobility of Lesser Poland, generally sympathetic to Władysław II, and the gentry of Greater Poland began to surface. In 1402, Władysław II answered the rumblings against his rule by marrying Anna of Cilli, a granddaughter of Casimir III of Poland, a political match that re-legitimised his reign, said to be suggested by the late Queen Jadwiga herself.

The Union of Vilnius and Radom of 1401 officially declared Vytautas the Grand Duke as co-ruler under Władysław II's overlordship while assuring the succession of the Lithuanian throne to the heirs of Władysław II rather than those of Vytautas: should Władysław II die without heirs, the Lithuanian boyars were to elect a new monarch. Since no heir had yet been produced by either monarch, the implications of the union were unforeseeable, but it forged bonds between the Polish and Lithuanian nobility and a permanent defensive alliance between the two states, strengthening Lithuania's hand for a new war against the Teutonic Order in which Poland officially took no part. While the document left the liberties of the Polish nobles untouched, it granted increased power to the boyars of Lithuania, whose grand dukes had till then been unencumbered by checks and balances of the sort attached to the Polish monarchy. The Union of Vilnius and Radom, therefore, earned Władysław II a measure of support in Lithuania.

In late 1401, the new war against the Order overstretched the resources of the Lithuanians, who found themselves fighting on two fronts after uprisings in the eastern provinces. Another of Władysław II's brothers, the malcontent Švitrigaila, chose this moment to stir up revolts behind the lines and declare himself grand duke. On 31 January 1402, he presented himself in Marienburg, where he won the backing of the Knights with concessions similar to those made by Władysław II and Vytautas during earlier leadership contests in the Grand Duchy.

==== Against the Teutonic Order ====
The war ended in the Treaty of Raciąż on 22 May 1404. Władysław II acceded to the formal cession of Samogitia and agreed to support the Order's designs on Pskov; in return, Konrad von Jungingen undertook to sell Poland the disputed Dobrzyń Land and the town of Złotoryja, once pawned to the Order by Władysław Opolski, and to support Vytautas in a revived attempt on Novgorod.

Also in 1404, Władysław II held talks at Vratislav with Wenceslaus IV of Bohemia, who offered to return Silesia to Poland if Władysław II supported him in his power struggle within the Holy Roman Empire. Władysław turned the deal down with the agreement of both Polish and Silesian nobles, unwilling to burden himself with new military commitments in the west.

==== Polish–Lithuanian–Teutonic war ====
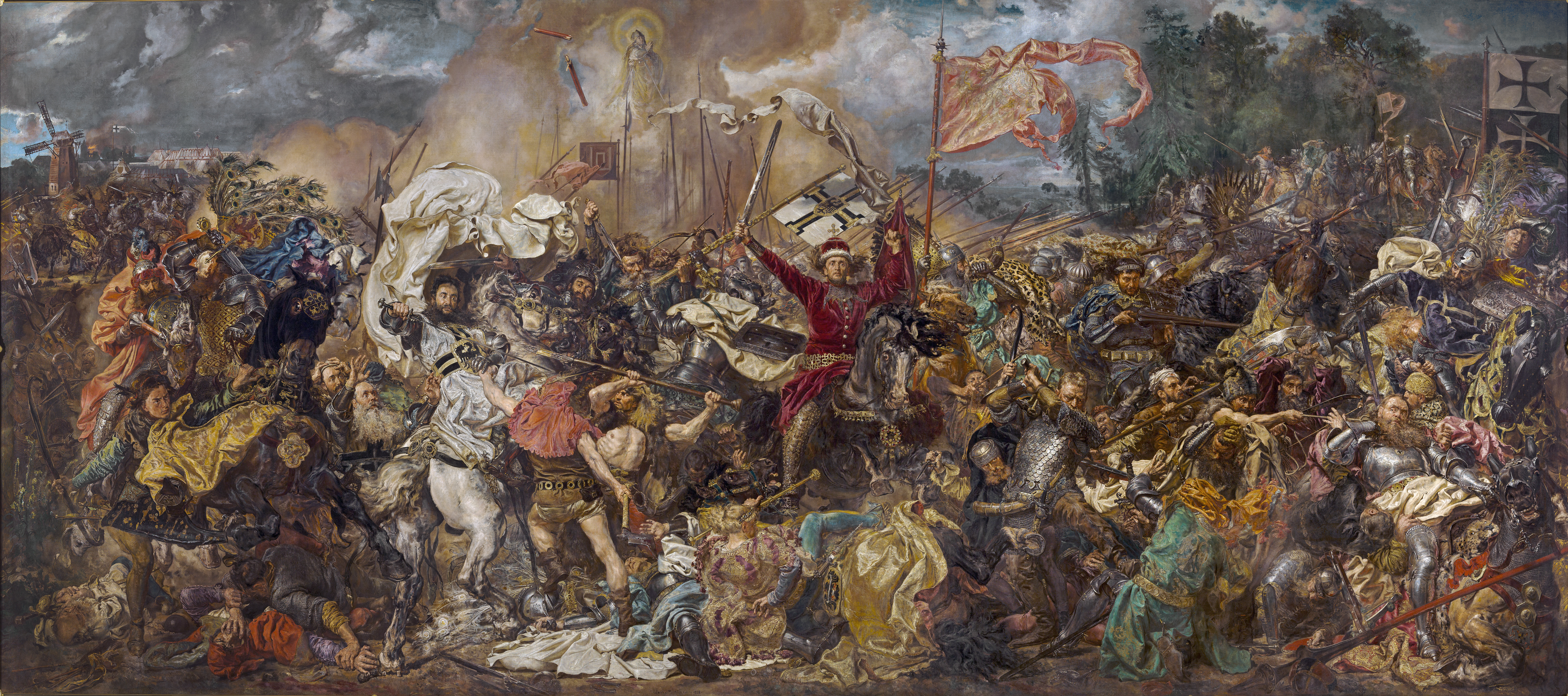
Battle of Grunwald, 1410, painting by Jan Matejko

In December 1408, Władysław II and Vytautas held strategic talks in Navahrudak Castle, where they decided to foment a Samogitian uprising against Teutonic rule to draw German forces away from Pomerelia. Władysław II promised to repay Vytautas for his support by restoring Samogitia to Lithuania in any future peace treaty. The uprising, which began in May 1409, at first provoked little reaction from the Knights, who had not yet consolidated their rule in Samogitia by building castles; but by June their diplomats were busy lobbying Władysław's court at Oborniki, warning his nobles against Polish involvement in a war between Lithuania and the Order. Władysław II, however, bypassed his nobles and informed the new Grand Master Ulrich von Jungingen that if the Knights acted to suppress Samogitia, Poland would intervene. This stung the Order into issuing a declaration of war against Poland on 6 August, which Władysław II received on 14 August in Nowy Korczyn.

The castles guarding the northern border were in such bad condition that the Knights easily captured those at Złotoryja, Dobrzyń and Bobrowniki, the capital of Dobrzyń Land, while German burghers invited them into Bydgoszcz (German: Bromberg). Władysław II arrived on the scene in late September, retook Bydgoszcz within a week, and came to terms with the Order on 8 October. During the winter, the two armies prepared for a major confrontation. Władysław installed a strategic supply depot at Płock in Masovia and had a pontoon bridge constructed and transported north down the Vistula.

Meanwhile, both sides unleashed diplomatic offensives. The Knights dispatched letters to the monarchs of Europe, preaching their usual crusade against the heathens; Władysław II countered with his letters to the monarchs, accusing the Order of planning to conquer the whole world. Such appeals successfully recruited many foreign knights to each side. Wenceslaus IV of Bohemia signed a defensive treaty with the Poles against the Teutonic Order; his brother, Sigismund of Luxembourg, allied himself with the Order and declared war against Poland on 12 July, though his Hungarian vassals refused his call to arms.

==== Battle of Grunwald ====
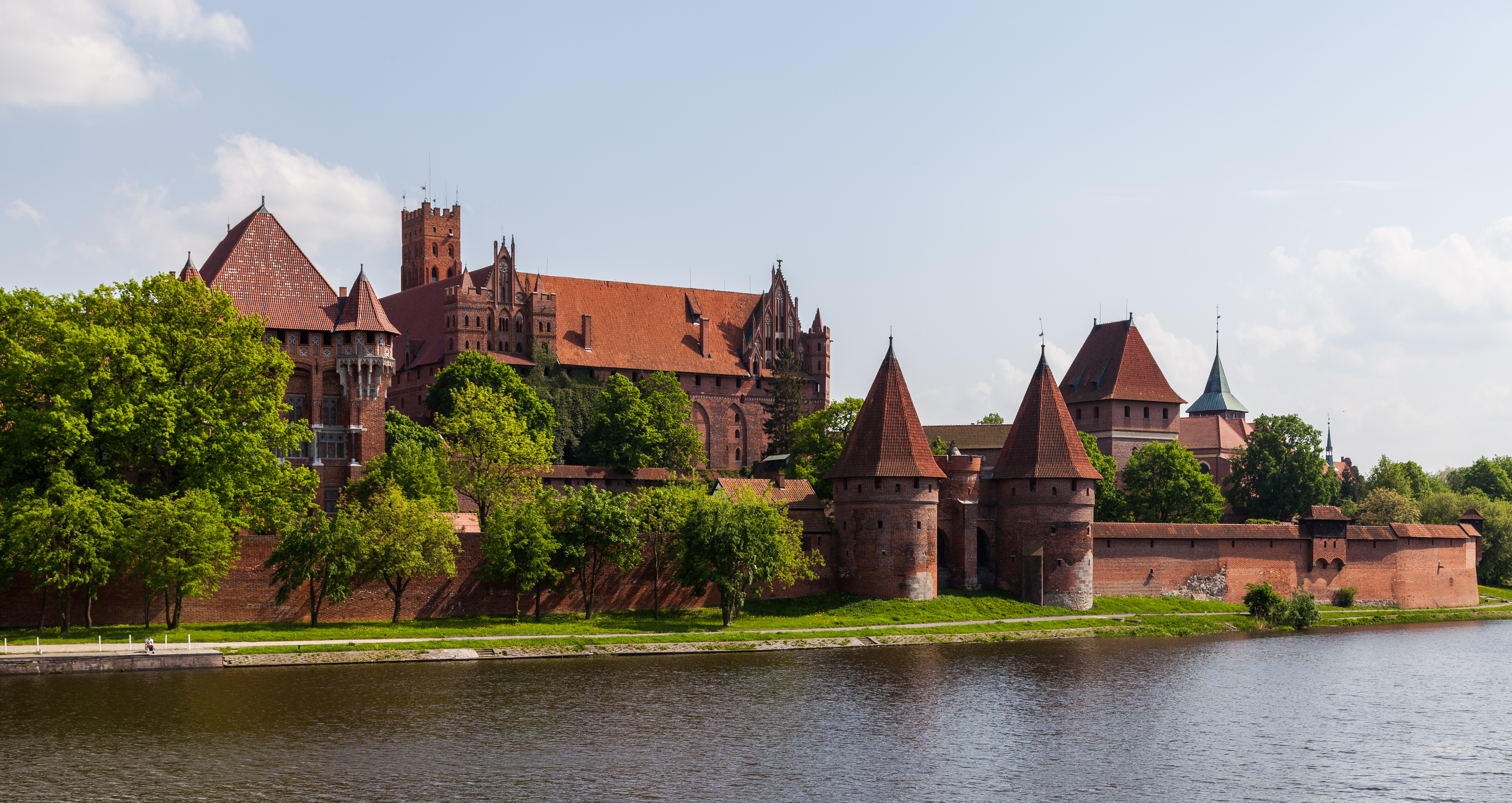
The Teutonic Order's castle at Marienburg, now Malbork

When the war resumed in June 1410, Władysław II advanced into the Teutonic heartland at the head of an army of about 20,000 mounted nobles, 15,000 armed commoners, and 2,000 professional cavalry mainly hired from Bohemia. After crossing the Vistula over the pontoon bridge at Czerwińsk, his troops met up with those of Vytautas, whose 11,000 light cavalry included Lithuanians, Ruthenians, and Tatars. The Teutonic Order's army had about 18,000 cavalry, mostly Germans, and 5,000 infantry. On 15 July, at the Battle of Grunwald after one of the largest and most ferocious battles of the Middle Ages, the allies won a victory so overwhelming that the Teutonic Order's army was virtually annihilated, with most of its key commanders killed in combat, including Grand Master Ulrich von Jungingen and Grand Marshal Friedrich von Wallenrode. Thousands of troops were reportedly slaughtered on either side.

The road to the Teutonic capital Marienburg now lay open, the city undefended; but for reasons the sources do not explain, Władysław II hesitated to pursue his advantage. On 17 July, his army began a laboured advance, arriving at Marienburg only on 25 July, by which time the new Grand Master, Heinrich von Plauen, had organised a defence of the fortress. The apparent half-heartedness of the ensuing siege, called off by Władysław II on 19 September, has been variously ascribed to the impregnability of the fortifications, high Lithuanian casualties, to Władysław's unwillingness to risk further casualties, or to his desire to keep the Order weakened but undefeated so as to not upset the balance of power between Poland (which would most likely acquire most of the Order possessions if it was totally defeated) and Lithuania; but a lack of sources precludes a definitive explanation.

==== Dissent ====
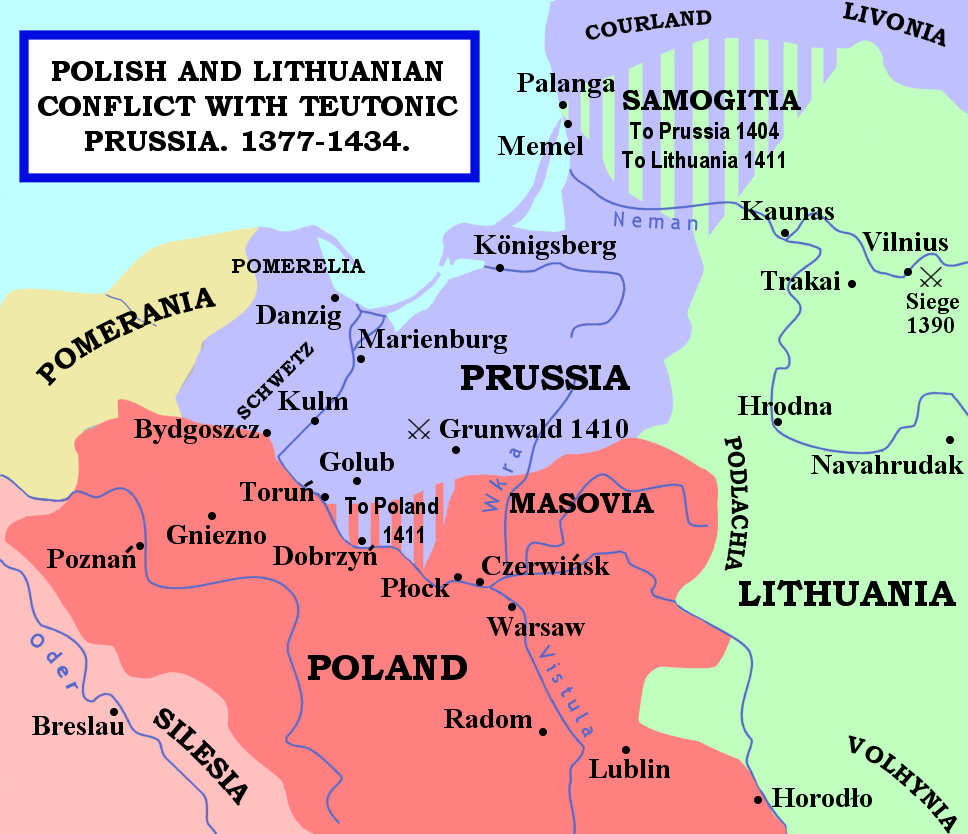
Polish and Lithuanian conflict with Teutonic Prussia, 1377–1434.

The war ended in 1411 with the Peace of Thorn, in which neither Poland nor Lithuania drove home negotiating advantages home to the full, much to the discontent of the Polish nobility. Poland regained Dobrzyń Land, Lithuania regained Samogitia, and Masovia regained a small territory beyond the Wkra river. Most of the Teutonic Order's territory, however, including towns that had surrendered, remained intact. Władysław II then released many high-ranking Teutonic Knights and officials for apparently modest ransoms. The cumulative expense of the ransoms, however, proved a drain on the Order's resources. This failure to exploit the victory to his nobles' satisfaction provoked growing opposition to Władysław's regime after 1411, further fueled by the granting of Podolia, disputed between Poland and Lithuania, to Vytautas, and by the king's two-year absence in Lithuania.

In an effort to outflank his critics, Władysław promoted the leader of the opposing faction, bishop Mikołaj Trąba, to the archbishopric of Gniezno in autumn 1411 and replaced him in Kraków with Vytautas's supporter Wojciech Jastrzębiec.

During rally at Jedlnia in 1413, Polish nobility recognized the King's only living daughter, Hedwig, as his heir on the throne of Poland. Władysław also sought to create more allies in Lithuania. The Union of Horodło on 2 October 1413 decreed that the Grand Duchy of Lithuania was "tied to our Kingdom of Poland permanently and irreversibly", and granted the Catholic nobles of Lithuania privileges equal to those of Polish szlachta. The act included a clause prohibiting the Polish nobility from electing a monarch without the consent of the Lithuanian nobility, and the Lithuanian nobility from electing a grand duke without the consent of the Polish monarch.

==== Last conflicts ====
In 1414, a sporadic new war broke out, known as the "Hunger War" from the Knights' scorched-earth tactics of burning fields and mills; but both the Knights and the Lithuanians were too exhausted from the previous war to risk a major battle, and the fighting petered out in the autumn. Hostilities did not flare up again until 1419, during the Council of Constance, when they were called off at the papal legate's insistence.

The Council of Constance proved a turning point in the Teutonic crusades, as it did for several European conflicts. Vytautas sent a delegation in 1415, including the metropolitan of Kiev and Samogitian witnesses; they arrived at Constance at the end of that year to express their preference for being "baptised with water and not with blood". The Polish envoys, among them Mikołaj Trąba, Zawisza Czarny, and Paweł Włodkowic, lobbied for an end to the forced conversion of heathens and to the Order's aggression against Lithuania and Poland. As a result of the Polish–Lithuanian diplomacy, the council, though scandalised by Włodkowic's questioning of the legitimacy of the monastic state, denied the Order's request for a further crusade and instead entrusted the conversion of the Samogitians to Poland–Lithuania.

The diplomatic context at Constance included the revolt of the Bohemian Hussites, who looked upon Poland as an ally in their wars against Sigismund, the emperor elect and new king of Bohemia. In 1421, the Bohemian Diet declared Sigismund deposed and formally offered the crown to Władysław II on condition that he accept the religious principles of the Four Articles of Prague, which he was not prepared to do. After Władysław II's refusal, Vytautas was postulated (elected in absentia) as Bohemian king, but he assured the pope that he opposed the heretics. Between 1422 and 1428, Władysław II's nephew, Sigismund Korybut, attempted a regency in war-torn Bohemia, with little success. Vytautas accepted Sigismund's offer of a royal crown in 1429 — apparently with Władysław's blessing — but Polish forces intercepted the crown in transit and the coronation was cancelled.

After Queen Anne's death in 1416, Jagiełło married out of love a Polish noblewoman, Elizabeth of Pilica, in 1417. It caused great unrest among Polish nobility, as marriage was elevating new queen's family above other nobles. Additionally, Elizabeth's relatively advanced age — as she was between 36 and 47 years-old at the time of the wedding — in opinion of szlachta was giving little hope for new potential heirs that would secure dynasty. Opposition to the royal marriage backed down, however, after the King threatened to abdicate.

Elizabeth died in 1420 and Władysław then took as his fourth wife Sophia of Halshany, in 1422.

In 1422, Władysław II fought another war, known as the Gollub War, against the Teutonic Order, defeating them in under two months before the Order's imperial reinforcements had time to arrive. The resulting Treaty of Melno ended the Knights' claims to Samogitia once and for all and defined a permanent border between Prussia and Lithuania. Lithuania was given the province of Samogitia, with the port of Palanga, but the city of Klaipėda was left to the Order. This border remained largely unchanged for roughly 500 years, until 1920. The terms of this treaty have, however, been seen as turning a Polish victory into defeat, as a result of Władysław II's renunciation of Polish claims to Pomerania, Pomerelia, and Chełmno Land, for which he received only the town of Nieszawa in return. The Treaty of Melno closed a chapter in the Knights' wars with Lithuania but did little to settle their long-term issues with Poland. Further sporadic warfare broke out between Poland and the Knights between 1431 and 1435.

Cracks in the cooperation between Poland and Lithuania after the death of Vytautas in 1430 had offered the Knights a revived opportunity for interference in Poland. Władysław II supported his brother Švitrigaila as grand duke of Lithuania, but when Švitrigaila, with the support of the Teutonic Order and dissatisfied Rus' nobles, rebelled against Polish overlordship in Lithuania, the Poles, under the leadership of Bishop Zbigniew Oleśnicki of Kraków, occupied Podolia, which Władysław II had awarded to Lithuania in 1411, and Volhynia. In 1432, a pro-Polish party in Lithuania elected Vytautas's brother Žygimantas as grand duke, leading to an armed struggle over the Lithuanian succession which stuttered on for years after Władysław's death.

==== Succession and death ====
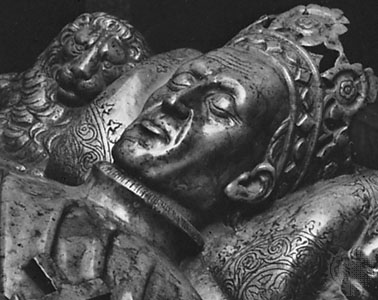
The effigy of Władysław II Jagiełło's sarcophagus at Wawel Cathedral

The death in 1431 of Jagiełło's daughter Hedwig (Jadwiga), the last known descendant of Casimir the Great, allowed the King to make his sons by Sophia of Halshany his heirs, though he had to placate the Polish nobility with concessions to ensure their agreement, since the monarchy was elective.

During an excursion into Przemyśl Land in the 48th year of his reign, Władysław II caught a cold from which he was unable to recover. He died in Grodek in 1434. His son Władysław was subsequently recognized in Lithuania as the Supreme Duke, and elected as the King of Poland on 25 July of the same year.

== Marriages and issue ==
Władysław married Polish queen regnant Jadwiga Anjou on 18 February 1386. They had one child, before Jadwiga's death on 17 July 1399:

- Elizabeth Bonifacia (22 June 1399 – 13 July 1399). Unlike Władysław's younger children, whose succession rights in Poland needed to be asserted given he was an elected ruler, Elizabeth – whose mother was a hereditary monarch – was viewed as the heir to the Polish throne by virtue of birth alone.

On 29 January 1402 Władysław took as his wife Anna of Cilli. They had one daughter:

- Jadwiga (8 April 1408 – 8 December 1431)

Anna died on 21 March 1416 and Jagiełło remarried on 2 May of the next year to Elizabeth of Pilica, who died on 12 May 1420. They were childless.

On 24 February 1422, Władysław wedded Sophia of Halshany, his probable grand-half-niece, by whom he had three children:

- Władysław III (31 October 1424 – disappeared 10 November 1444), King of Poland and Supreme Duke of Lithuania (1434 – 1444), as well as King of Hungary (1440 – 1444).
- Casimir (16 May 1426 – 2 March 1427)
- Casimir Andrew (30 November 1427 – 7 June 1492), Grand Duke of Lithuania (1440 – 1492) and King of Poland (1447 – 1492)

== Legacy ==
Władysław is depicted on the obverse of the modernized 100 Polish złoty banknote.

The Jagiełło Oak, an ancient tree in Białowieża Forest, is named in honour of the fact that he initiated the tradition of royal hunting in the area.

In 2021, asteroid (202093) 2004 TP_{17} was officially named as Jogaila (the Lithuanian language variant of his name).

== Ruthenian cultural ties ==
The Byzantine-Ruthenian fresco of Christ in Majesty in the Holy Trinity Chapel, Lublin, commissioned by Władysław II Jagiełło (1418). The image includes a Patriarchal cross (associated with the Jagiellonian dynasty) in the lower medallion.

Jogaila maintained close cultural ties with the Ruthenian tradition. Jogaila's mother, Uliana of Tver, was a devout Eastern Orthodox princess who raised him in a Ruthenian cultural environment and pushed him toward the Orthodox Church. During his reign, he brought Ruthenian masters to Poland to paint frescoes, including in the king's bedroom in Wawel Castle (1393–1394) and the Holy Trinity Chapel in Lublin Castle (around 1418). Jogaila also conducted diplomatic correspondence with his cousin Vytautas in the Ruthenian language. Ruthenian was also used in letters addressed to Jogaila by Sigismund Kęstutaitis in 1433.

== Gallery ==
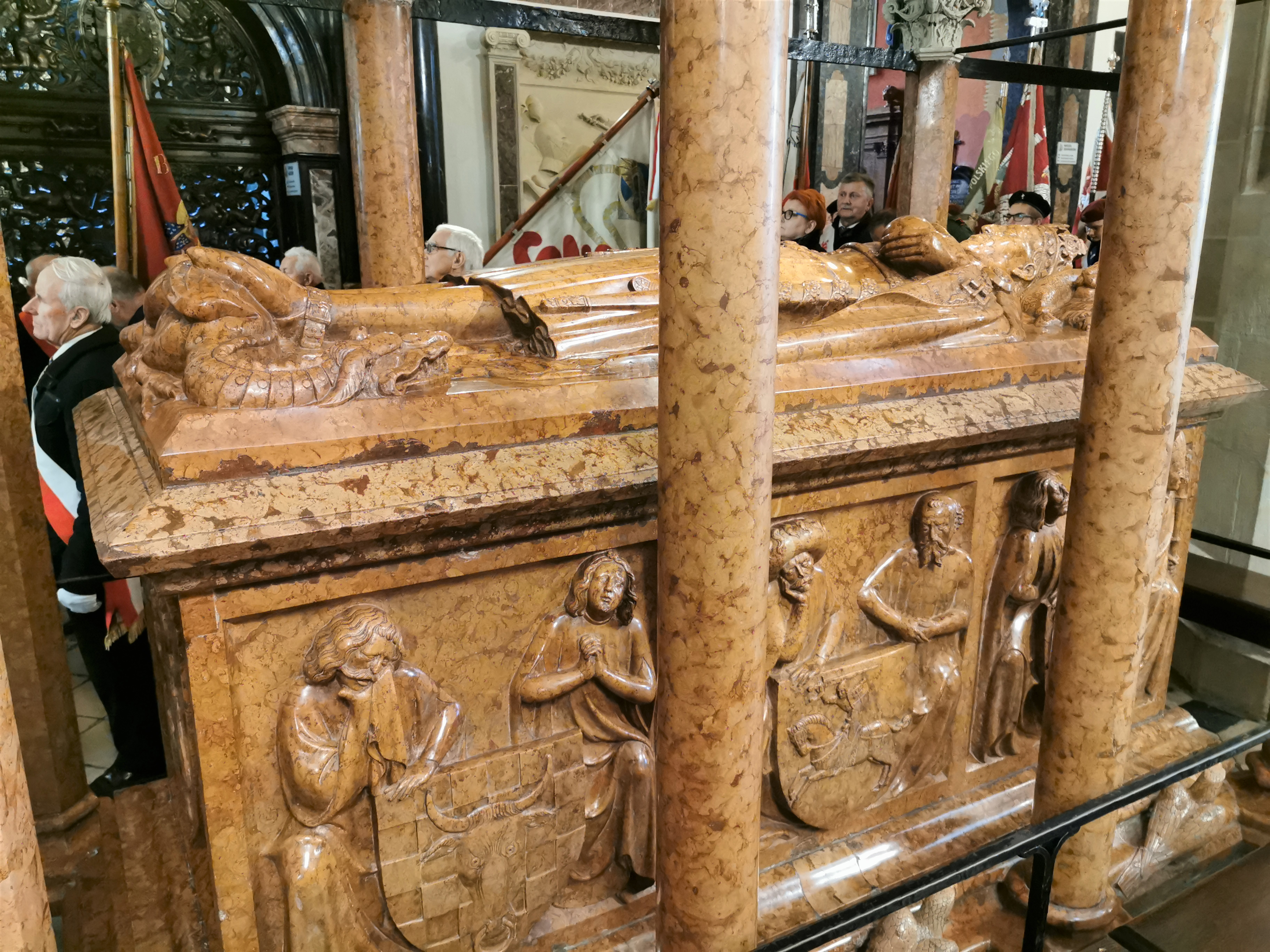
Effigy of Władysław II Jagiełło at Wawel Cathedral in Kraków

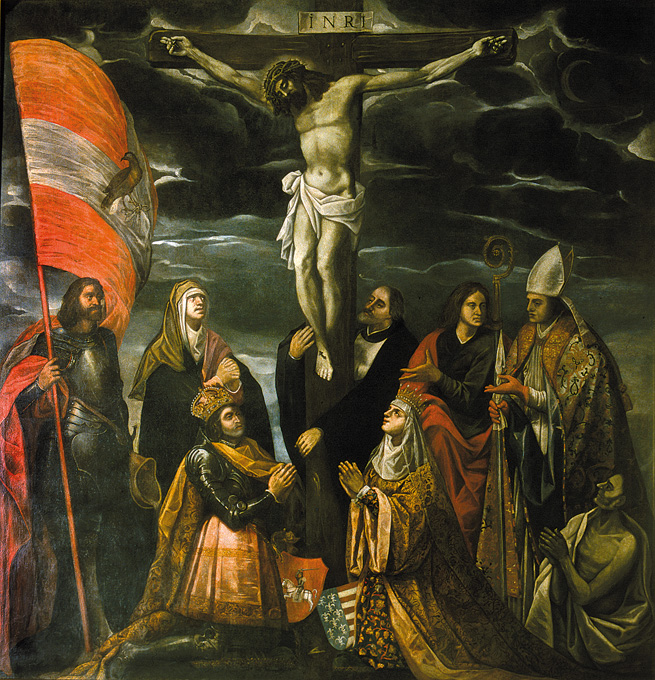
A 17th century depiction of Władysław II Jagiełło and Jadwiga of Poland by the cross by Tommaso Dolabella

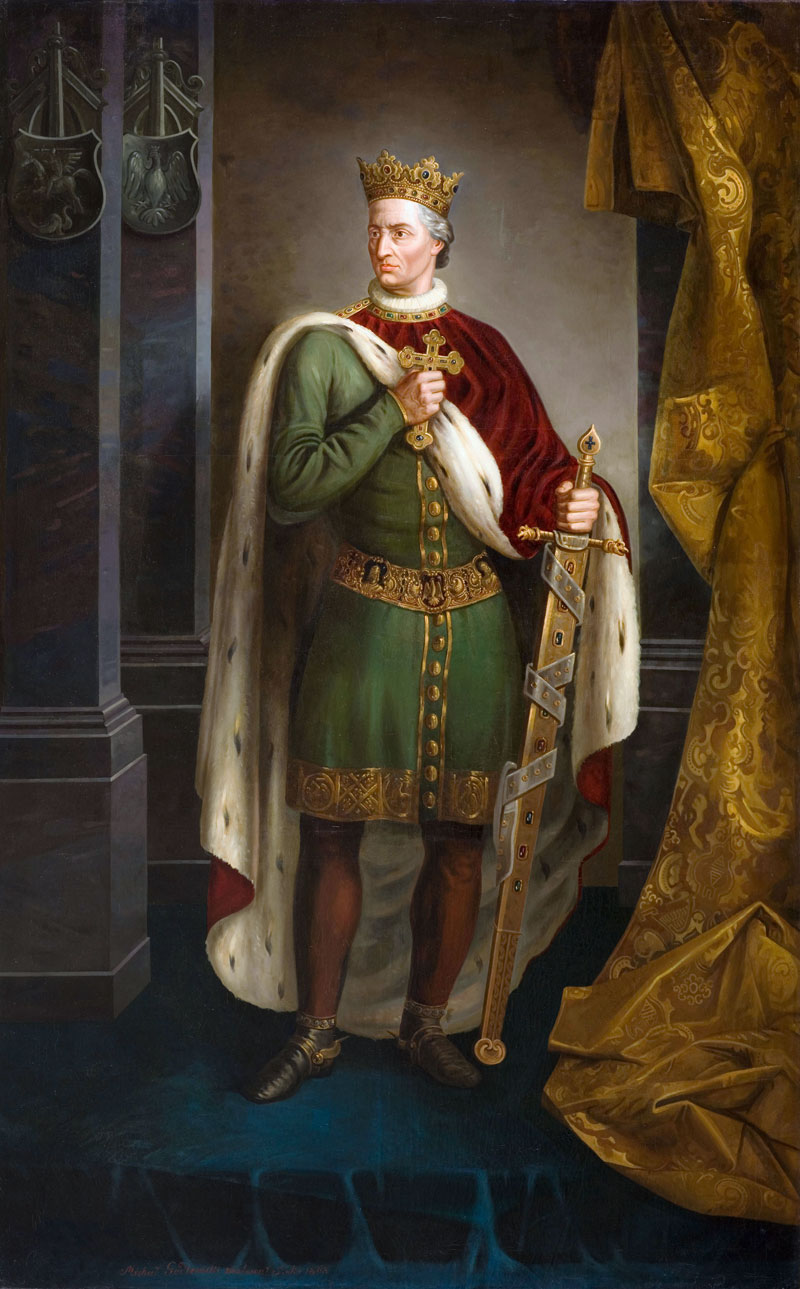
Portrait of Władysław II Jagiełło holding a cross and sword, by Michał Godlewski, 1863

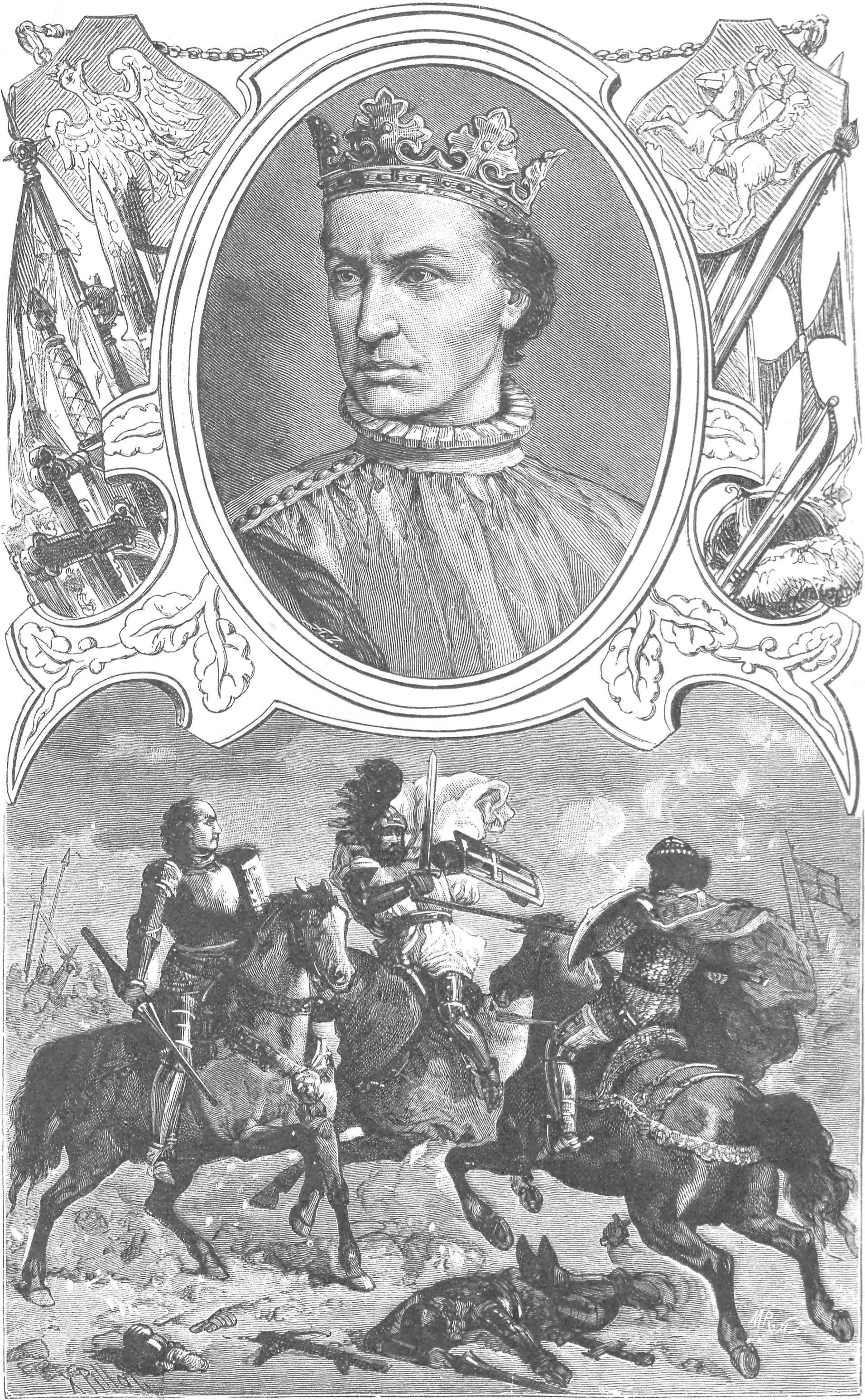
Władysław II Jagiełło as depicted in Ksawery Pillati's Portraits of Polish Princes and Kings, 1888

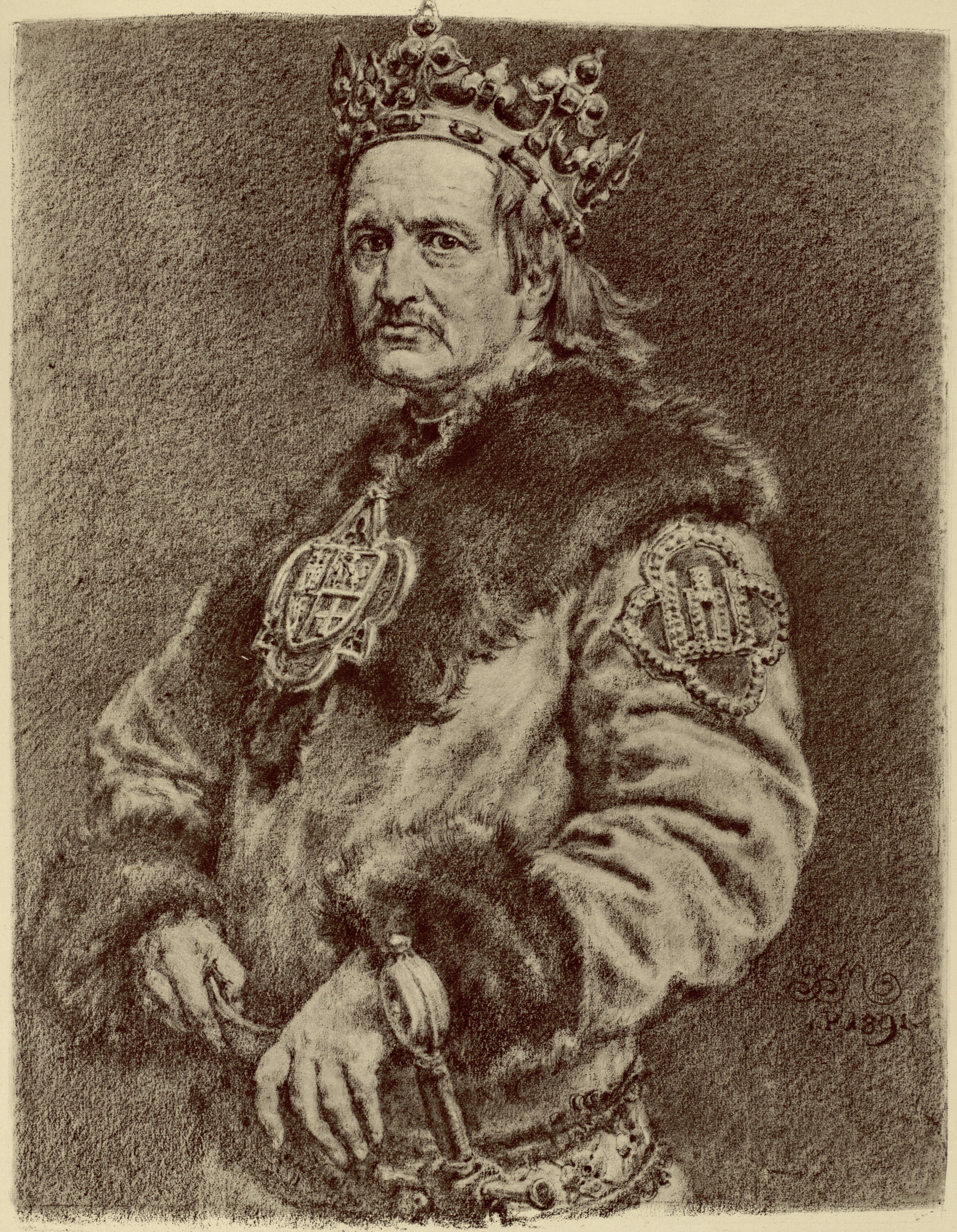
Władysław II Jagiełło by Jan Matejko, early 1890s

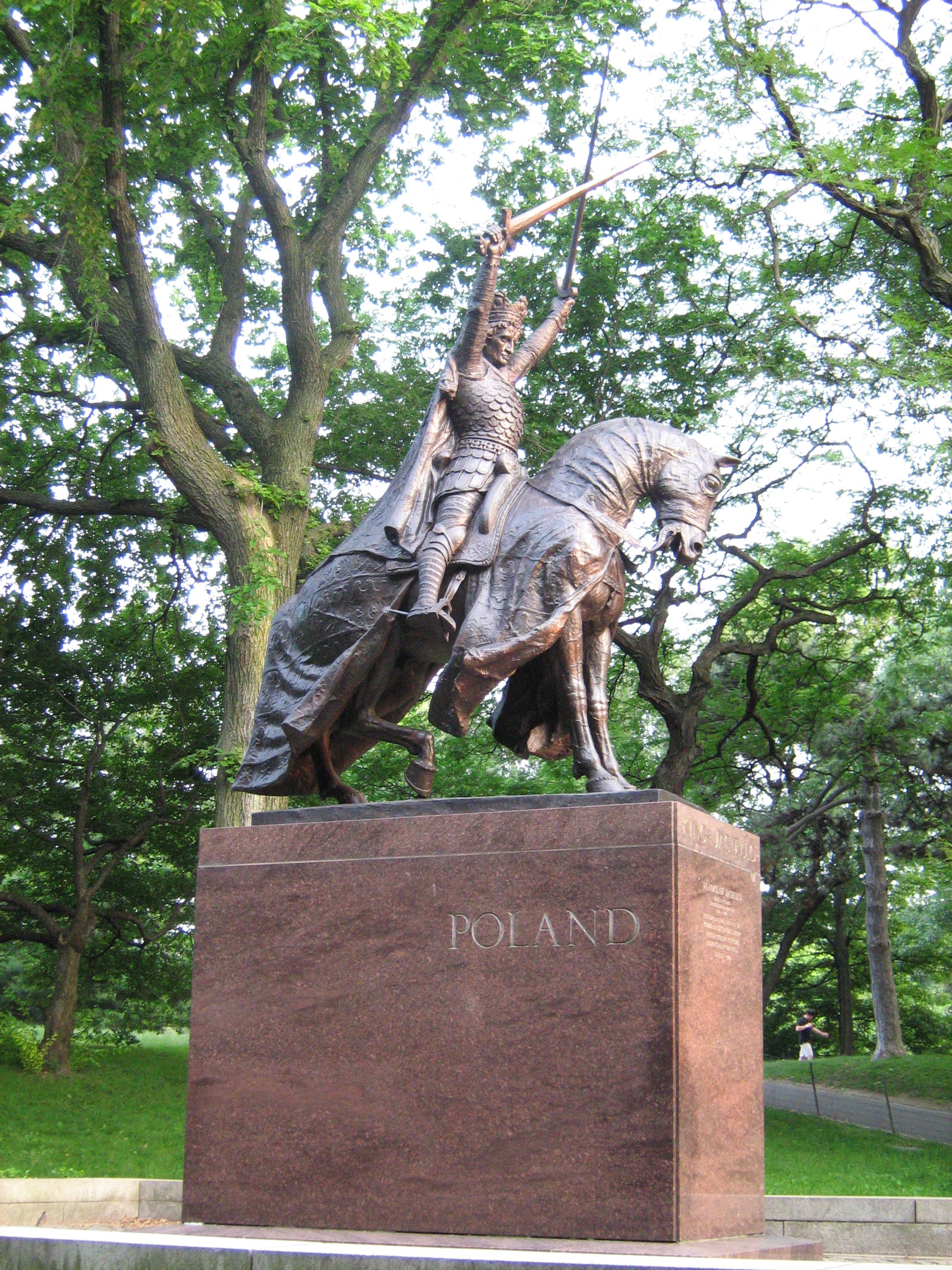
King Jagiello Monument, Central Park, New York

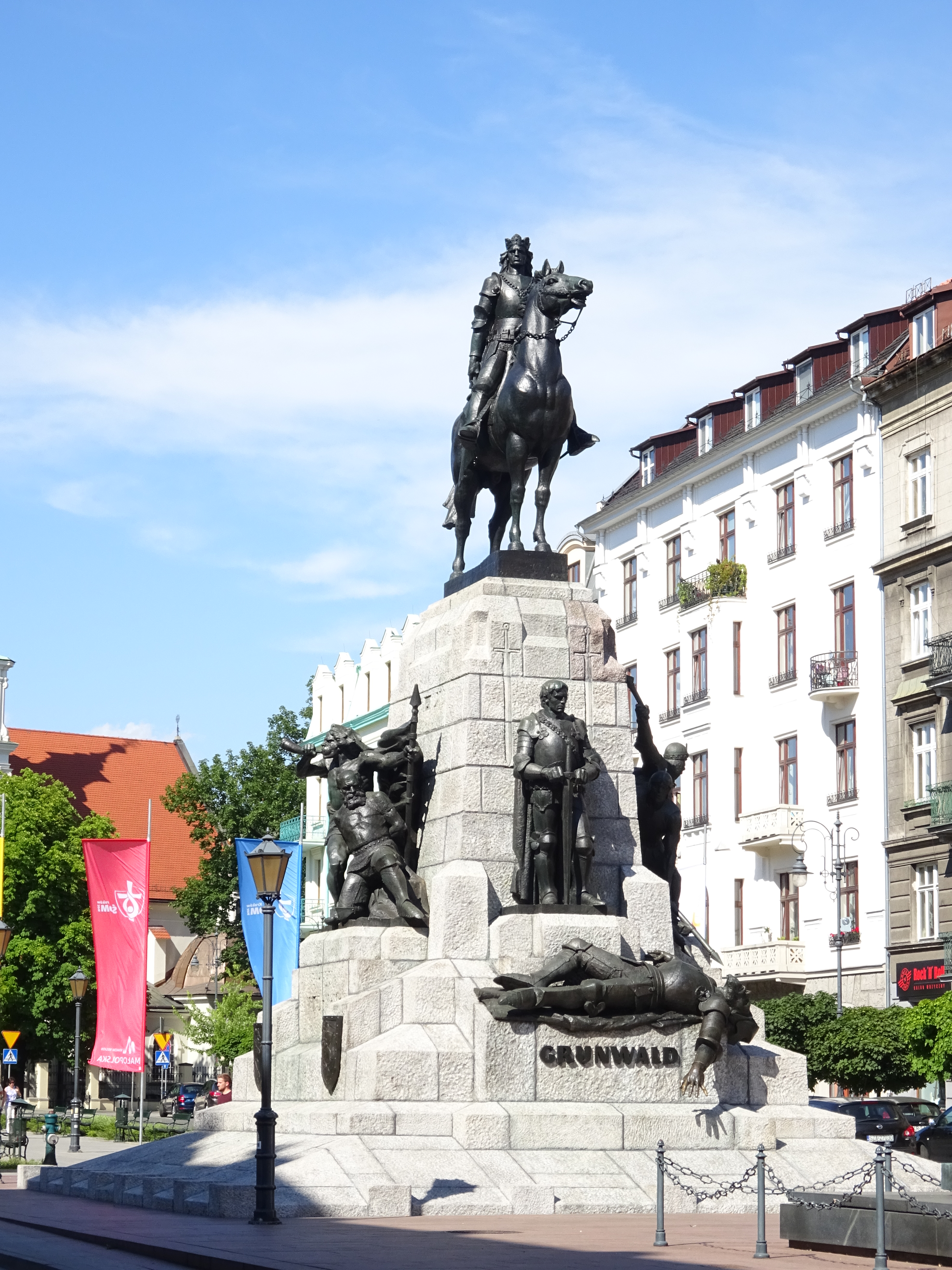
Grunwald Monument, Kraków

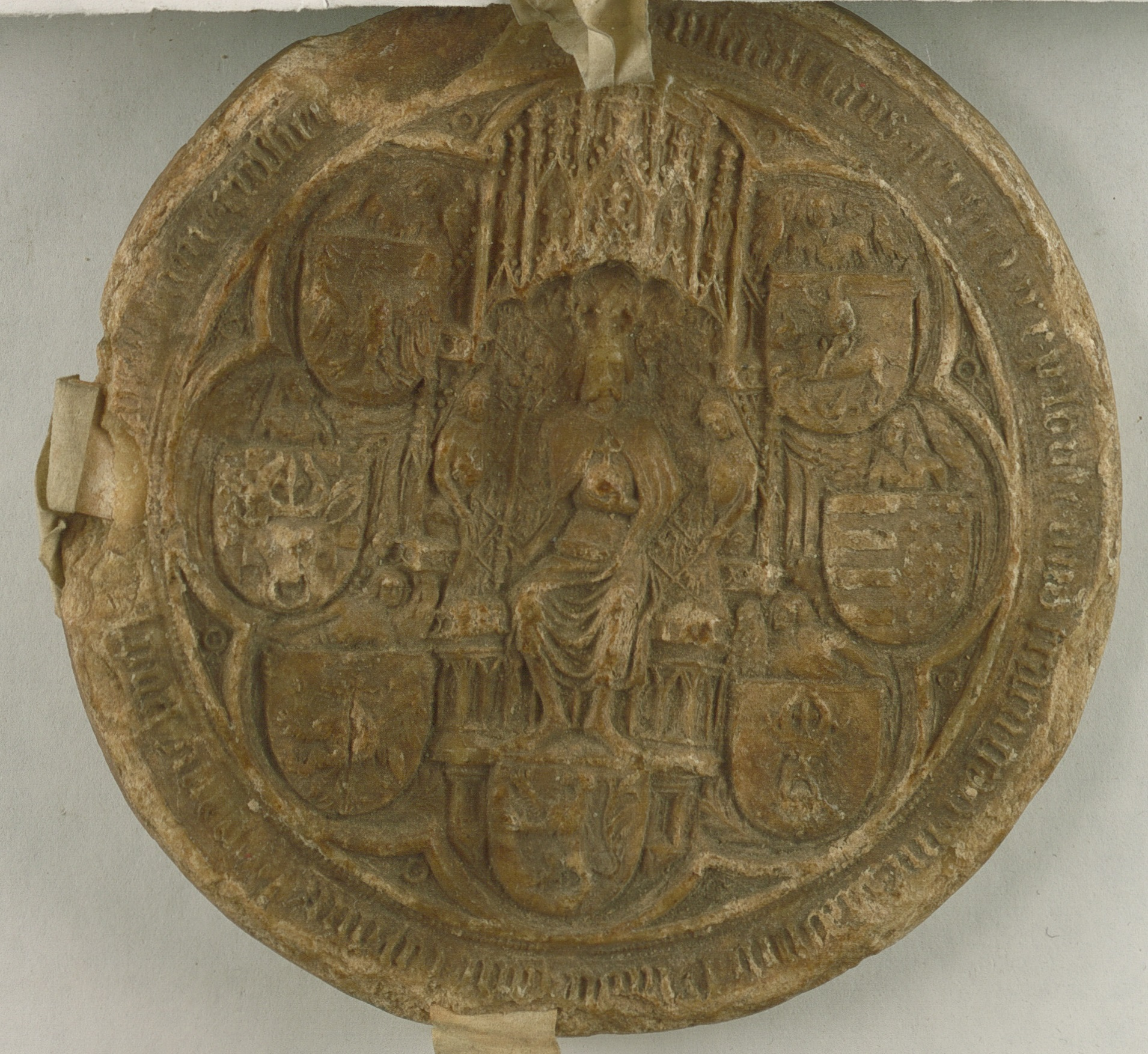
Royal seal of Władysław II Jagiełło, 1411

== Family tree ==
Family tree of Jogaila/Władysław II Jagiello

Gediminas b. c. 1275 d. 1341		Jewna b. c. 1280 d. 1344	Alexander I of Tver b. 1301 d. 22 October 1339		Anastasia of Halych
	Algirdas b. c. 1296 d. May 1377			Uliana Alexandrovna of Tver b. c. 1330 d. 1392

1 Jadwiga I of Poland b. 1374 d. 17 July 1399; OO 18 February 1386	2 Anne of Cilli b. 1380/1381 d. 21 May 1416; OO 29 January 1402	Jogaila/Władysław II Jagiełło b. c. 1351/1363 d. 1 June 1434	3 Elisabeth of Pilica b. 1372 d. 12 May 1420; OO 2 May 1417	4 Sophia of Halshany b. c. 1405 d. 21 September 1461; OO 7 February 1422
1	2	4	4	4
Elizabeth Bonifacia b. 22 June 1399 d. 13 July 1399	Hedwig b. 8 April 1408 d. 8 December 1431	Władysław III b. 31 October 1424 d. 10 November 1444	Casimir b. 16 May 1426 d. 2 March 1427	Casimir IV b. 30 November 1427 d. 7 June 1492

== See also ==
- History of Lithuania
- History of Poland (1385–1569)
- Names and titles of Władysław II Jagiełło
- Naming citation for Jovian asteroid 202093 Jogaila
- List of Lithuanian rulers
- King Jagiello Monument
- List of Poles
- Monument to Jadwiga and Jagiełło in Kraków

== Bibliography ==
- Baczkowski, Krzysztof (1999), Wielka historia Polski. Tom 3: Dzieje Polski późnośredniowiecznej (1370–1506) (in Polish), Fogra Oficyna Wydawnicza, ISBN 83-7311-075-5
- Besala, Jerzy (2006). Małżeństwa królewskie. Jagiellonowie (in Polish). Bellona Muza. ISBN 8311105553.
- Bideleux, Robert (1998), A History of Eastern Europe: Crisis and Change, Routledge, ISBN 978-0-415-16111-4
- Bojtár, Endre (1999), Foreword to the Past: A Cultural History of the Baltic People, translated by Walter J. Renfroe, Budapest: Central European University Press, ISBN 978-963-9116-42-9
- Borkowska, Urszula (2012). Dynastia Jagiellonów w Polsce (in Polish). PWN. ISBN 9788301205331.
- Delbrück, Hans (1990), The Barbarian Invasions: History of the Art of War, University of Nebraska Press, ISBN 978-0-8032-6447-2
- Deveike, Jone (1950), "The Lithuanian Diarchies", The Slavonic and East European Review, 28 (71): 392–405
- Dvornik, Francis (1992), The Slavs in European History and Civilization, Rutgers University Press, ISBN 978-0-8135-0799-6
- Housley, Norman (1992), The Later Crusades 1274–1580: From Lyons to Alcazar, Oxford University Press, ISBN 978-0-19-822136-4
- Jasienica, Paweł (1988), Polska Jagiellonów (in Polish), Warsaw: Państwowy Instytut Wydawniczy, ISBN 978-83-06-01796-0
- Jurzak, Ryszard (2006), "Władysław II Jagiełło", Dynastic Genealogy
- Karwasińska, Jadwiga & Zakrzewski, Ignacy (1892), Lites ac res gestae inter Polonos Ordinemque Cruciferorum, Warsaw: Bibliotheca Cornicensis (in Polish and Latin)
- Kienzler, Iwona (2012), Władysław Jagiełło, Wierny mąż niewiernych żon, Bellona, ISBN 978-83-11-12209-3
- Kłoczowski, Jerzy (2000), A History of Polish Christianity, Cambridge University Press, ISBN 978-0-521-36429-4
- Lukowski, Jerzy & Zawadzki, Hubert (2001), A Concise History of Poland, Cambridge University Press, ISBN 978-0-521-55917-1
- Magocsi, Paul Robert (1996), A History of Ukraine, University of Toronto Press, ISBN 978-0-8020-7820-9
- Meyendorff, John (1989), Byzantium and the Rise of Russia (Reprint ed.), Crestwood, NY: Vladimir's Seminary Press, ISBN 978-0-88141-079-2
- Mickūnaitė, Giedrė (1999), "From Pamphlet to Origin Theory", in Kooper, Erik Simon (ed.), The Medieval Chronicle: Proceedings of the 2nd International Conference on the Medieval Chronicle, Amsterdam: Rodopi, ISBN 978-90-420-0834-2
- Morys-Twarowski, Michael (2026). Jagiełło Rex. Początek dynastii (in Polish). Znak Horyzont. ISBN 978-83-8427-537-5.
- Nowakowska, Natalia, ed. (2019). Remembering the Jagiellonians. Routledge. ISBN 978-1-138-56239-4.
- Plokhy, Serhii (2006), The Origins of the Slavic Nations: Premodern Identities in Russia, Ukraine, and Belarus, Cambridge University Press, ISBN 978-0-521-86403-9
- Potašenko, Grigorijus (2008), Multinational Lithuania: history of ethnic minorities, Šviesa, ISBN 9785430052508
- Prazmowska, Anita J. (2011), A History of Poland: Second Edition, Palgrave Macmillan, ISBN 978-0230345379
- Rowell, S. C. (2000), "Baltic Europe", in Jones, Michael (ed.), The New Cambridge Medieval History VI, Cambridge University Press, ISBN 978-0-521-36290-0
- Rowell, S. C. (1994), Lithuania Ascending: A Pagan Empire Within East-central Europe, 1295–1345, Cambridge University Press, ISBN 978-0-521-45011-9
- Sedlar, Jean W. (1994), East Central Europe in the Middle Ages, 1000–1500, Seattle: University of Washington Press, ISBN 978-0-295-97290-9
- Śląsk w polityce Piastów ("Silesia within the policies of the Piasts") (in Polish), Polska Piastów, 2005, archived from the original on 18 October 2006
- Sruogienė-Sruoga, Vanda (1987), "Jogaila (1350–1434)", Lituanus, 33 (4), archived from the original on 20 September 2020
- Stone, Daniel Z. (2001), The Polish-Lithuanian State, 1386–1795, Seattle: University of Washington Press, ISBN 978-0-295-98093-5
- Tęgowski, Jan (1999), Pierwsze pokolenia Giedyminowiczow (in Polish), Poznań-Wrocław: Wydawn. Historyczne, ISBN 978-83-913563-1-9
- Turnbull, Stephen (2003), Tannenberg 1410: Disaster for the Teutonic Knights, Osprey Publishing, ISBN 978-1-84176-561-7
- Turnbull, Stephen (2004), Crusader Castles of the Teutonic Knights (2): Baltic Stone Castles 1184–1560, Osprey Publishing, ISBN 978-1-84176-712-3
- Turnbull, Stephen & McBride, Angus (2004), The Hussite Wars: 1419–1436, Osprey Publishing, ISBN 978-1-84176-665-2
- Wasilewski (1991). "Daty urodzin Jagiełły i Witolda". Przegląd Wschodni. 1 (1).

Władysław II Jagiełło Jagiellon dynasty Cadet branch of the Gediminid dynasty Born: c. 1351/1362 Died: 1 June 1434
Regnal titles
Preceded by Algirdas	Grand Duke of Lithuania; 1377 – 1381	Succeeded by Kęstutis
Preceded by Kęstutis	Grand Duke of Lithuania; 1382 – 1434 with Vytautas (1401 – 1430), Švitrigaila (1430 – 1432) and Sigismund Kęstutaitis (1432 – 1434)	Succeeded by Władysław and Sigismund Kęstutaitis
Preceded by Jadwiga as sole monarch	King of Poland; 1386 – 1434 with Jadwiga (1386 – 1399)	Succeeded by Władysław III
