= Velyki Birky settlement hromada =

Hromada in Ternopil Oblast, Ukraine

Velyki Birky settlement hromada Великобірківська селищна громада
- hromada
- Seal

- Location within Ternopil Oblast Location within Ukraine
- Coordinates: 49°31′15″N 25°45′13″E
- Country: Ukraine
- Oblast: Ternopil Oblast
- Raion: Ternopil Raion
- Administrative center: Velyki Birky

Government
  - Hromada head: Liubomyr Kovch

Area
  - Total: 65.8 km^{2} (25.4 sq mi)

Population (2022)
  - Total: 5,944
- Urban-type settlement: 1
- Villages: 3
- Website: v-birky-gromada.gov.ua

Velyki Birky settlement hromada (Ukrainian: Великобірківська селищна територіальна громада, romanized: Velykobirkivska selyshchna terytorialna hromada is a hromada in Ukraine, in Ternopil Raion of Ternopil Oblast. The administrative center is the urban-type settlement of Velyki Birky. Its population is 5,944 (2022 estimate)

It was formed on 29 August 2019 by amalgamation of Velyki Birky settlement council and Malyi Khodachkiv rural council of Ternopil Raion.

== Settlements ==
The community consists of 1 urban-type settlement (Velyki Birky) and 3 villages:

- Kostiantynivka
- Malyi Khodachkiv
- Smykivtsi
