= Smykivtsi =

Rural locality in Ternopil Oblast, Ukraine

Smykivtsi Смиківці
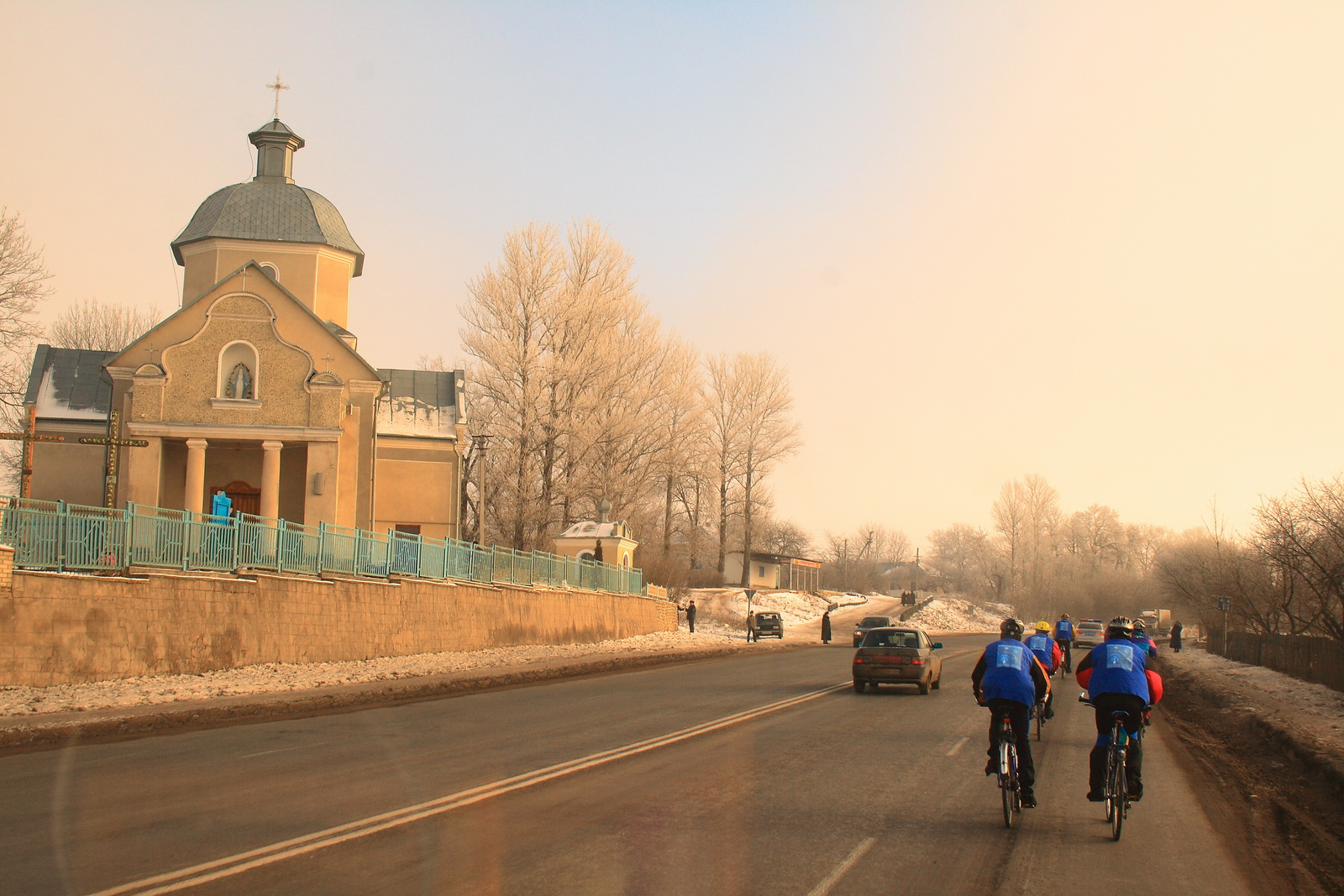

- Location in Ternopil Oblast
- Coordinates: 49°31′49″N 25°42′30″E
- Country: Ukraine
- Oblast: Ternopil Oblast
- Raion: Ternopil Raion
- Hromada: Velyki Birky settlement hromada
- Time zone: UTC+2 (EET)
  - Summer (DST): UTC+3 (EEST)
- Postal code: 47717

Smykivtsi (Ukrainian: Смиківці) is a village in Velyki Birky settlement hromada, Ternopil Raion, Ternopil Oblast, Ukraine.

== History ==
The first written mention of the village was in 1545.

== Religion ==
- Church of the Nativity of the Blessed Virgin Mary (1894, brick; completed in 1915).

== Sources ==
- "Smykowce". Geographical Dictionary of the Kingdom of Poland (in Polish). 10. Warszawa: Kasa im. Józefa Mianowskiego. 1889. p. 926.
- (in Ukrainian) Крищук М., Уніят В.]], Смиківці // Ternopil Encyclopedic Dictionary: in 4 v. / editorial board: H. Yavorskyi and other, Ternopil: "Zbruch", 2008, V. 3: П—Я, S. 300. — ISBN 978-966-528-279-2.
