= Kostiantynivka, Ternopil Oblast =

Rural locality in Ternopil Oblast, Ukraine

Kostiantynivka Костянтинівка
- Location in Ternopil Oblast
- Coordinates: 49°28′9″N 25°48′31″E
- Country: Ukraine
- Oblast: Ternopil Oblast
- Raion: Ternopil Raion
- Hromada: Velyki Birky settlement hromada
- Time zone: UTC+2 (EET)
  - Summer (DST): UTC+3 (EEST)
- Postal code: 47741

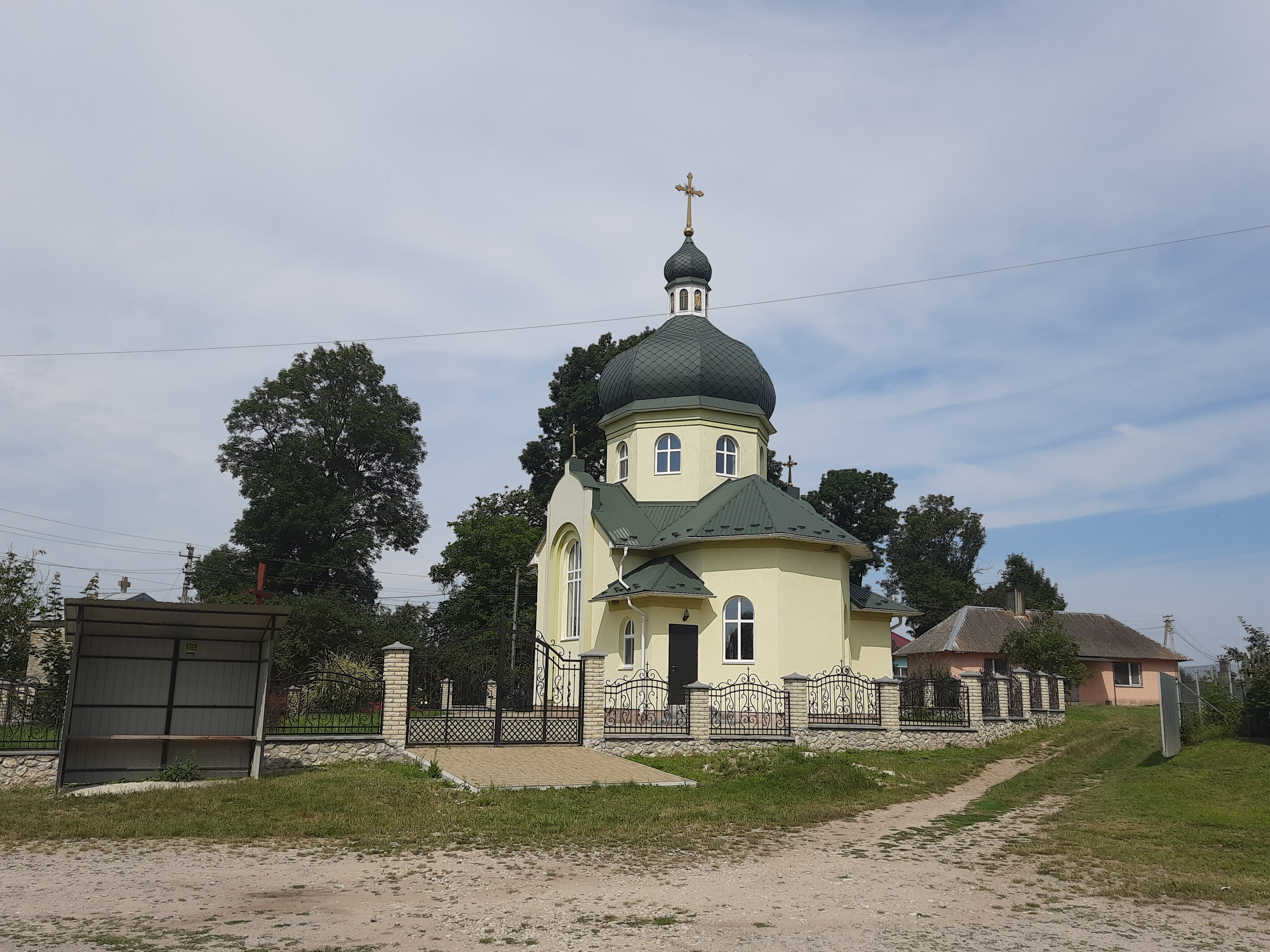
Church of the Holy Trinity (Kostiantynivka) Ternopil district, Ternopil region

Kostiantynivka (Ukrainian: Костянтинівка) is a village in Velyki Birky settlement hromada, Ternopil Raion, Ternopil Oblast, Ukraine.

== History ==
The first written mention of the village was in 1810.

== Religion ==
- Holy Trinity church (1924; brick).

== Sources ==
- (in Ukrainian) Войцехівський Р., Уніят В., Костянтинівка // Ternopil Encyclopedic Dictionary: in 4 v. / editorial board: H. Yavorskyi and other, Ternopil: "Zbruch", 2005, V. 2: К—О, S. 200. — ISBN 966-528-199-2.
- "Konstantynówka". Geographical Dictionary of the Kingdom of Poland (in Polish). 4. Warszawa: Kasa im. Józefa Mianowskiego. 1883. p. 364.
