= Karol Dejna =

Polish linguist (1911–2004)

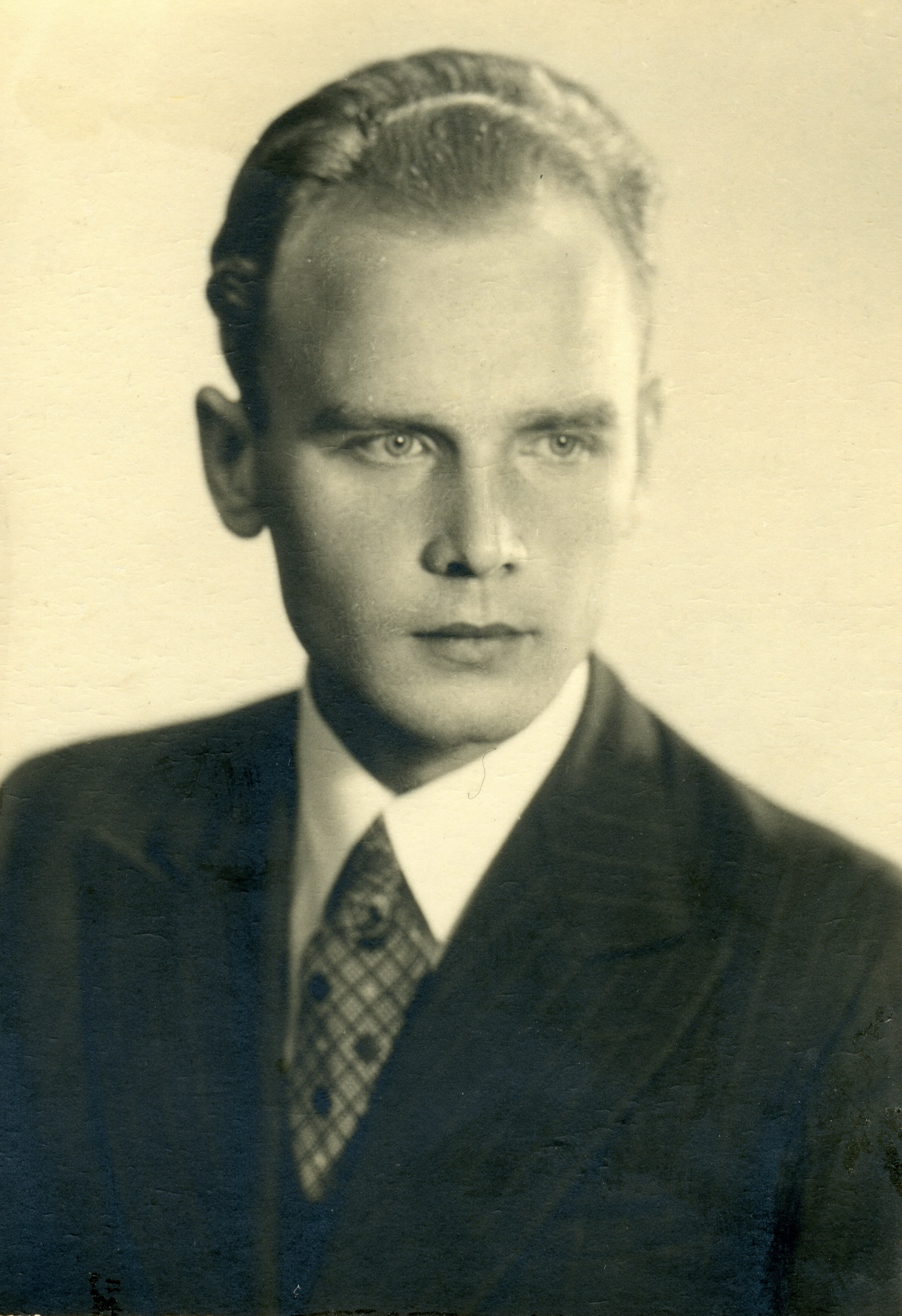
- Born: November 10, 1911; Velyki Birky
- Died: April 15, 2004 (aged 92); Łódź
- Education: University of Lviv
- Scientific career
- Fields: linguistics
- Workplaces: University of Łódź

Karol Dejna (10 November 1911 – 15 April 2004) was a Polish linguist.

In 1930 he graduated from the Juliusz Słowacki State Secondary School in Tarnopol. He studied Polish philology at the Jan Kazimierz University in Lviv, from which he graduated in 1935. Until 1941 he worked as a teacher in Lviv secondary schools. From 1945 associated with the University of Łódź, initially as an assistant, then assistant professor (1947 defended his doctorate, 1952 habilitated), deputy professor (1951–1954) and professor (from 1954). From 1954 he was an associate professor, and from 1962 a full professor. In 1983 he became a correspondent member of the Polish Academy of Sciences, and in 1989 a full member of the Academy. From 1993 a correspondent member of the Polish Academy of Arts and Sciences. At the University of Łódź, he was, inter alia, the position of vice-rector (1956–1959), deputy director of the Institute of Polish Philology (1970–1979), in 1988 he was awarded the title of doctor honoris causa.

From 1956, a member of the Linguistics Committee of the Polish Academy of Sciences, for many years (from 1976) chairman of the Dialectological Committee. In the years 1985–1989 he was the deputy chairman of the Łódź Branch of the Polish Academy of Sciences. Member of the Łódź Scientific Society, chairman of the First Department of this association, vice-president and editor of the "Dissertations of the Language Commission of the Łódź Scientific Society". He was a laureate of departmental awards, the City of Łódź Award (1982), and the scientific award of the Łódź Scientific Society (1985); he was also awarded the Commander's Cross of the Order of Polonia Restituta, the Officer's Cross of the Order of Polonia Restituta, the Knight's Cross of the Order of Polonia Restituta, the Medal of the National Education Commission and the honorary title of Merit Teacher of the Polish People's Republic.

In his scientific work he dealt with Slavic dialectology. He was the author of over 100 scientific works, including:

- Polsko-laskie pogranicze językowe na terenie Polski (1951–1952)
- Gwary ukraińskie Tarnopolszczyzny (1957)
- Atlas gwarowy województwa kieleckiego (1962–1968)
- Dialekty polskie (1973)
- Atlas polskich innowacji dialektalnych (1981)
- Atlas gwar polskich. Kwestionariusz - notatnik (1987)
- Słownik gwary czeskiej mieszkańców Kucowa (1990)
- Z zagadnień ewolucji oraz interferencji językowej (1991)
