= Names and titles of Władysław II Jagiełło =

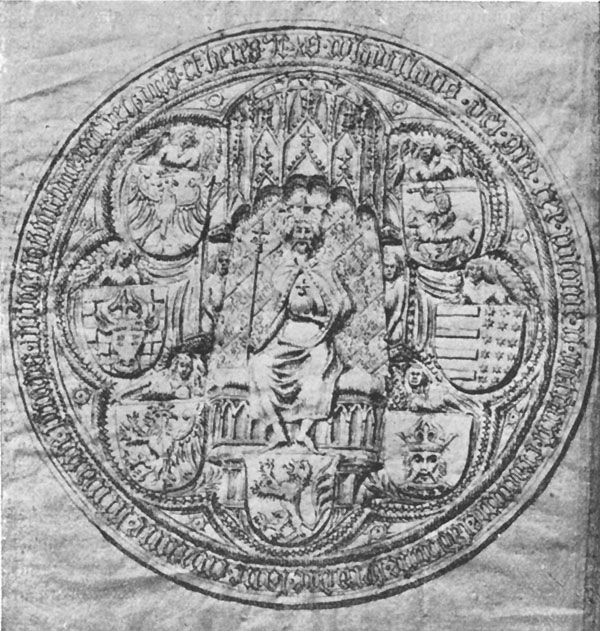
Royal seal of Władysław II Jagiełło

Jogaila, later Władysław II Jagiełło (ca.1351/1363–1434), was a Grand Duke of Lithuania and from 1386 King Jadwiga's husband and jure uxoris King of Poland. In Lithuania, he held the title Didysis Kunigaikštis, translated as Grand Duke or Grand Prince (kunigaikštis is a cognate of König and king, and didysis magnifies it).

He is known under a number of names: Lithuanian: Jogaila Algirdaitis; Polish: Władysław II Jagiełło; Belarusian: Jahajła (Ягайла). As a monarch who ruled two states under different names and who used a number of titles, particularly in Lithuania, Jogaila has been accorded a variety of designations in history books. The study of his names and titles sheds light on the nature of sovereignty in both Lithuania and Poland and on the balance of power between the two states in the early days of the Polish-Lithuanian unions.

== Ruler of Lithuania ==
Jogaila's father Algirdas was supreme ruler of Lithuania and ruled the country with his brother, Kęstutis, the Duke of Trakai; after Algirdas's death in 1377, his son Jogaila ruled in the same way with Kęstutis, but this arrangement between the two relatives soon came under strain.

Jogaila began his reign in the eastern part of Lithuania, the duchy where his father had ruled, which bordered on territories of former Kievan Rus, and he left the government of the western duchy to his uncle Kęstutis, who ruled from his castle at Trakai. Jogaila ruled many more Russian subjects than Lithuanian, and his titles often reflected this. The tradition of coregency among Lithuanian rulers enabled them to simultaneously pursue a western policy towards Poland and the Monastic State of the Teutonic Knights and an eastern one towards the Russian powers, for example the Principality of Moscow, the Novgorod Republic, and the Pskov Republic. The Principality of Moscow, especially after Prince Dmitri's defeat of the Golden Horde at the Battle of Kulikovo in 1380, posed a particular threat to Lithuania and Jogaila's rule. Though Jogaila was much younger than Kęstutis, he inherited the title "Grand Duke", while Kęstutis continued to hold the title "Duke of Trakai". But then, in 1380, Kęstutis overthrew Jogaila and assumed the title of Grand Duke for himself. Kęstutis seized Vilnius, the seat of the grand dukes. A year later, Jogaila raised an army from his father's vassals and won back the title, the aging Kęstutis dying soon afterwards in the Kreva Castle under mysterious circumstances, leaving his son Vytautas to continue the power struggle against Jogaila.

The tradition of dual rule had become established among the Lithuanian dukes, enabling them to contain the Teutonic Knights in the west while pursuing expansionism in the east. There had been previous joint reigns between Dausprungas and Mindaugas, Pukuveras and Butigeidis, Vytenis and Gediminas, Jaunutis and Kęstutis, as well as between Algirdas and Kęstutis. The nature of this Lithuanian dual rule, as also practised between Jogaila and Kęstutis and later between Jogaila and Vytautas, is difficult to define precisely. According to the historian S.C.Rowell, it "reflects political expediency; it certainly does not meet the formal definition of diarchy as 'rule by two independent authorities'...those two leaders were not equal: the grand duke in Vilnius was supreme".

From Algirdas, Jogaila inherited a mixed array of styles, as recorded in different Catholic documents, to indicate his status as supreme ruler: the titles furst, herczog, rex, and dux are preceded by the adjectives gross, obirster, supremus, and magnus. The Lithuanian rulers' various titles are all attempts to convey both supremacy over lower rulers, and independence of any higher ruler. The term kunigas is cognate with German König. Algirdas, who had married Uliana, daughter of Alexander I, grand prince of Tver, had been the first Lithuanian ruler to style himself velikii kniaz, a Rus'ian equivalent of his Lithuanian title, perhaps also signifying his rule in the Rus' lands under his control. He also called himself magnus rex and supremus princeps. Rather than didysis kunigaikštis, many of Jogaila's subjects would have called him hospodar, the title used, for example, by the rulers of Moldavia.

The medieval Lithuanian grand dukes ruled in a similar way to the Russian grand princes (the title didysis kunigaikštis is equivalent to the Russian velikii kniaz, the Slavic kniaz being like the Baltic kunigaikštis a cognate of König). They headed a loose confederation whose constituent parts were ruled by lesser leaders. In effect, the grand duke acted as primus inter pares within a dynasty, with other members of the dynasty ruling constituent parts of the state. Whichever way the lesser Lithuanian princes styled themselves, they always acknowledged the supremacy of the grand-ducal office. Although a special place was reserved in the hierarchy for the two princes who ruled the Lithuanian duchies, other princes would collaborate in state matters such as the negotiation of treaties.

== Supremacy ==
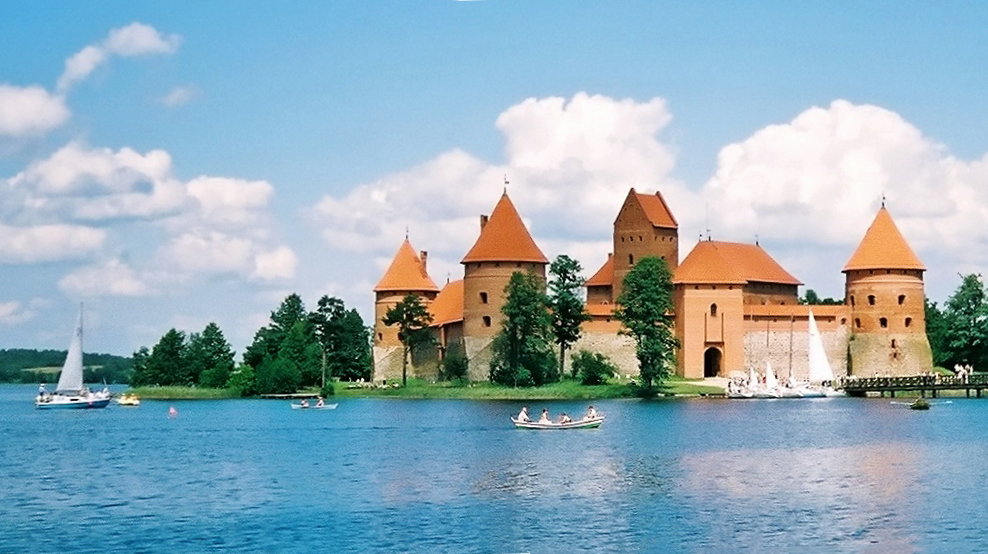
The reconstructed Trakai Island Castle, from where Kęstutis and Skirgaila governed as first dukes under Jogaila.

When Jogaila became the king of Poland in 1386, he reserved his position as the supreme duke of Lithuania. At first he appointed his brother Skirgaila as the duke of Trakai, (dux Trocensis), effectively his regent in Lithuania; but Vytautas, the son of the former duke of Trakai, Kęstutis, challenged Skirgaila with the backing of the Teutonic Order, besieged Vilnius, and reduced the outer city to ruins. In response, Władysław, as Jogaila was called after ascending the Polish throne, was forced to come to terms with Vytautas. Skirgaila stepped down as duke of Trakai and became prince of Kiev, while Vytautas not only replaced him as de facto ruler of Lithuania but was confirmed in the title of magnus dux or grand duke by the terms of the Treaty of Ostrów. However, Władysław reserved overlordship as supreme duke or prince, with the higher title of dux supremus. While conceding control of the active government of Lithuania, the Polish monarchy by this treaty positioned itself as the overlord of the Lithuanian monarchy.

Vytautas himself had other intentions: though he accepted the title, he continued to demand Lithuania's complete separation from Poland. He also pursued an ambitious expansionist policy to the east, hoping to conquer Novgorod and Pskov, and he is known to have styled himself velikii kniaz or grand prince, a term borrowed from Kievan Rus'. But in 1399, his forces and those of his ally, Khan Tokhtamysh of the White Horde, were crushed by the Timurids at the Battle of the Vorskla River. The defeat left him with no choice but to submit to Władysław's overlordship once more.

Vytautas's distrust of Polish sovereignty over Lithuania may have been well founded, since Władysław had in principle signed Lithuania's independence away in 1385 in the formal act of union, by which he agreed to incorporate Lithuania into Poland. The Union of Vilnius and Radom of 1401 reaffirmed Vytautas's tenure as grand duke under Władysław's overlordship, but it assured the title of grand duke to Władysław's heirs rather than to those of Vytautas: if Władysław died without heirs, the Lithuanian boyars were to elect a new monarch. Since neither Władysław nor Vytautas had yet produced an heir, the implications of the act were unforeseeable.

Władysław had to wait until Vytautas finally died without an heir in 1430 to exercise his power over the Lithuanian succession, when he made the mistake of choosing his troublesome brother Švitrigaila as the new grand duke of Lithuania. Within two years Švitrigaila rebelled and, like Vytautas before him, sought to break away from Polish overlordship and reign as an independent grand duke of Lithuania. Władysław was obliged to replace him with Vytautas's brother Žygimantas, whom he ordered to restore the union by force. The struggle over the Lithuanian succession was to continue long after Władysław's death culminating with the Battle of Wiłkomierz.

== King of Poland ==
As King of Poland, Jogaila assumed the Slavic name Władysław, which roughly translates as "glorious ruler" and is often Latinised as either Wladislaus or Ladislaus. The choice evoked both Władysław I Łokietek, the Elbow-high, who unified the kingdom a century before, and Saint Ladislaus I of Hungary, a king who had sided with the pope against the empire and Christianised Transylvania.

Władysław at first ruled as a co-monarch with Queen Jadwiga, who had been crowned not as a queen but as a king (Rex Poloniae) because the Polish political system made no provision for a queen regnant. Jadwiga's death in 1399 jeopardised Władysław's position on the throne, so he married Anna of Celje, a granddaughter of Casimir III of Poland from the Piast dynasty, a political marriage that confirmed his tenure of the Polish crown.

Additionally, with the deaths of Jadwiga and her daughter Elizabeth, the Polish monarchy ceased to be hereditary, though in practice the nobles, who possessed the right to elect the monarch, were happy to observe the principles of heredity in return for concessions and privileges.

== Titles ==
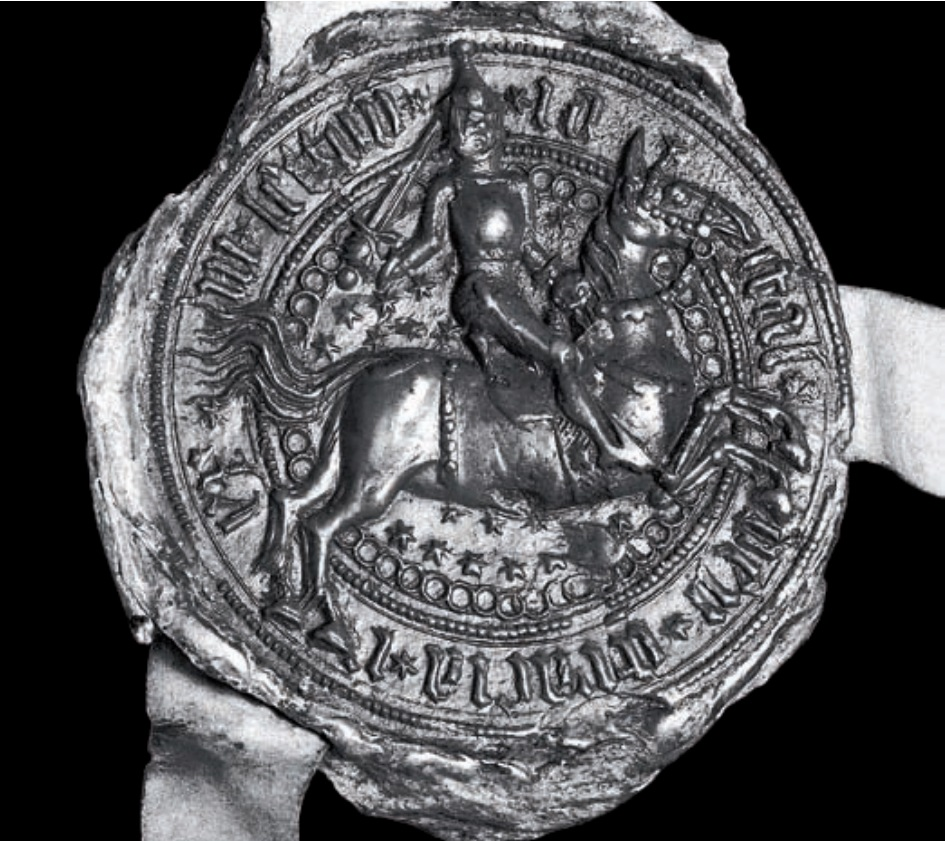
Seal of Jogaila as Rex in Lettow (King in Lithuania)

Versions in various languages:

Lithuanian title in Latin: Breviary excerpts from a Latin document in 1383: Nos Jagalo divina deliberacione magnus Rex vel dux litwanorum, Russieque dominus et here. (His grandfather Gediminas had added rex, princeps et dux Semigallie to his style).

From a German document, 1380: Wir Jagel obirster kung der Littouwen.

From a German document, 1382, with his brother Skirgaila: Wir Jagal von gotis gnaden grosir konig czu lyttauwen und wir Skirgal Hertzog zcu Tracken, gebrudere.

From a Latin seal, 1382: Iagal Dey Gracia Rex in Lettow.

Polish title in Latin: Wladislaus Dei gracia rex Polonie necnon terrarum Cracovie, Sandomirie, Syradia, Lancicie, Cuiavie, Lithuanie princeps supremus, Pomoranie Russieque dominus et heres etc.

- English translation: Vladislaus by God's grace king of Poland, and lands of Kraków, Sandomierz, Sieradz, Łęczyca, Kuyavia, supreme-prince of Lithuania, lord and heir of Pomerania and Ruthenia, etc..
- Polish translation: Władysław, z Bożej łaski król Polski, ziemi krakowskiej, sandomierskiej, sieradzkiej, łęczyckiej, kujawskiej, Wielki Książe Litewski, pan i dziedzic Pomorza i Rusi, etc.
- Lithuanian translation: Vladislovas, Dievo valia karalius Lenkijos ir žemių Krokuvos, Sandomiro, Sieradžo, Lenčycos, Kujavijos, Lietuvos didysis kunigaikštis, Pomeranijos ir Rusios valdovas ir paveldėtojas, etc..
- Belarusian translation: Уладзіслаў, з Божай ласкі кароль польскі, зямлі кракаўскай, сандамерскай, серадзкай, лучыцкай, куяўскай, князь літоўскі, пан і дзедзіч паморскі і рускі, etc.

== See also ==
- Coregency
- Diarchy
- Grand Prince
- Grand Duke
- Hospodar
- Polish monarchs
- Skirgaila
- Vytautas the Great
