= Malyi Khodachkiv =

Rural locality in Ternopil Oblast, Ukraine

Malyi Khodachkiv Малий Ходачків
- Location in Ternopil Oblast
- Coordinates: 49°29′13″N 25°50′9″E
- Country: Ukraine
- Oblast: Ternopil Oblast
- Raion: Ternopil Raion
- Hromada: Velyki Birky Hromada
- Time zone: UTC+2 (EET)
  - Summer (DST): UTC+3 (EEST)
- Postal code: 47741

Malyi Khodachkiv (Ukrainian: Малий Ходачків) is a village in Velyki Birky settlement hromada, Ternopil Raion, Ternopil Oblast, Ukraine.

== History ==
The first written mention is from 1464.

== Religion ==
- Saint Michael church (1811, brick; built on the site of an old wooden church)
