= Union of Horodło =

1413 series of pacts between Poland and Lithuania

Poland and Lithuania 1386–1434

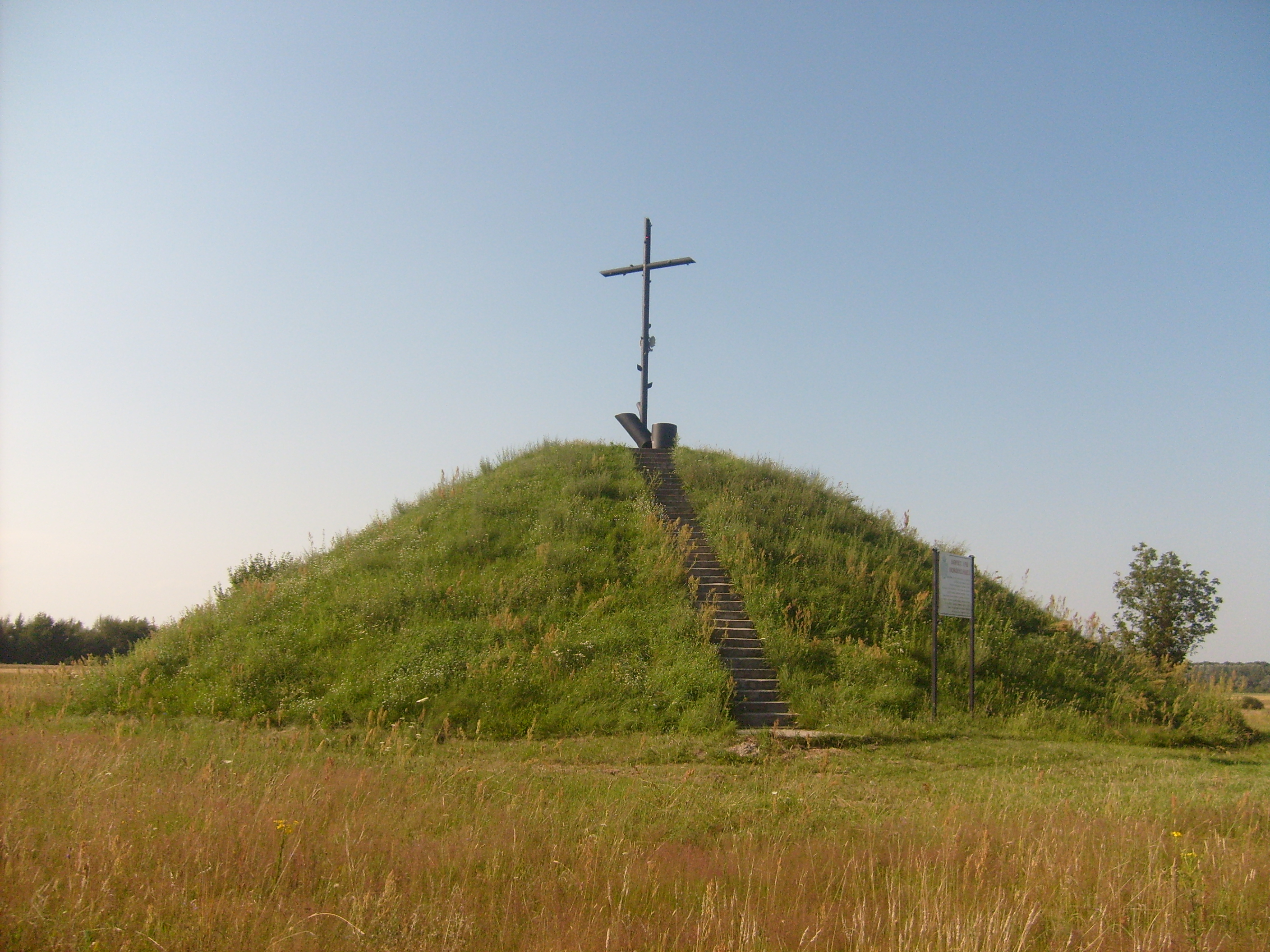
Mound of the Horodło Union; the monument was built in 1861 in Horodło to celebrate the 448th anniversary of the union.

The Union of Horodło or Pact of Horodło was a set of three acts signed in the town of Horodło on 2 October 1413. The first act was signed by Władysław II Jagiełło, King of Poland, and Vytautas, Grand Duke of Lithuania. The second and third acts were composed by the Polish nobility (szlachta) and Lithuanian boyars, respectively. The union amended the earlier Polish–Lithuanian unions of Krewo and Vilnius–Radom. Politically, Lithuania received more autonomy as, after the death of Vytautas, the Lithuanian nobles could choose another Grand Duke instead of passing the title to Władysław II Jagiełło or his heir. However, culturally, Lithuania and Poland grew closer. Lithuania adopted Polish institutions of castellans and voivodes. Catholic Lithuanian nobles and church officials were granted equal rights with the Polish nobles and clergy. Forty-seven selected Lithuanian nobles were adopted by Polish families and granted Polish coats of arms. Thus the union signified the beginnings of the Polonization of Lithuanian culture and the rise of the Lithuanian nobility. It was one of the major steps towards the modernization and Europeanization of Lithuania.

== Historical background ==
Poland and Lithuania had been joined in a personal union since the Union of Krewo of 1385. Both countries were ruled by Władysław II Jagiełło. However, after the Lithuanian Civil War (1389–1392) and the Ostrów Agreement, Vytautas gained the supreme power in Lithuania. The legal basis for Polish–Lithuanian relations was revisited by the Union of Vilnius and Radom of 1401, which reiterated de facto Lithuanian independence and de jure Polish supremacy. Vytautas was to be known by the title of Grand Duke (magnus dux) and enjoyed vast power in Lithuania, while technically he was subordinate to Władysław II Jagiełło, 'Supreme Duke' (supremus dux) and King of Poland. The union was signed after Vytautas' army was soundly defeated in the Battle of the Vorskla River and weakened Lithuania was looking for Polish support. Taking advantage of the Lithuanian defeat, the Principality of Smolensk, Veliky Novgorod, and Pskov rebelled against Lithuanian rule, drawing Vytautas into a war with the Grand Principality of Moscow. However, within a few years peace was re-established in the east.

In 1409, the second Samogitian uprising against the Teutonic Knights escalated into the Polish–Lithuanian–Teutonic War. Joint Polish–Lithuanian forces defeated the Knights in the decisive Battle of Grunwald in 1410. However, the war did not resolve all the disputes and by 1413 Poland–Lithuania was preparing for another war with the Knights (see Hunger War). These developments encouraged Poland and Lithuania to review their relationship.

== Provisions ==
The treaty repeated the indissoluble character of the Polish–Lithuanian union while carefully balancing Polish and Lithuanian interests. The Lithuanians gained more autonomy as they received the right to elect a new Grand Duke after the death of Vytautas. The earlier Union of Vilnius and Radom stipulated that Lithuania would pass to Władysław II Jagiełło or his heir. However, the Lithuanian nobles promised to consult the Polish nobles when choosing a successor to Vytautas. The reverse was also true: the Polish nobles promised to consult with the Lithuanians when electing the next Polish King. The pact contained one of the first mentions of the Seimas of the Grand Duchy of Lithuania. The Polish and Lithuanian nobles agreed to hold a joint general sejm to discuss all major matters, but such a sejm did not take place until 1564. Nevertheless, it was a recognition of the political powers of the Lithuanian nobles.

The Lithuanian nobles and clergy were granted equal rights with the Polish nobility and clergy. However, this extended only to Catholics; many Ruthenian nobles, who were Eastern Orthodox, were excluded, however, in 1434, Grand Duke Sigismund Kęstutaitis repealed some of the provisions in the Horodło acts that limited the political rights of Orthodox believers. It would take until 1563 till there was full equality between the two confessions. Selected Lithuanian nobles, 47 in total, were adopted into Polish heraldic families and granted Polish coats of arm. This symbolic gesture signified their desire to adopt Western customs and integrate into Western society. Equal rights encouraged cooperation and kinship between Polish and Lithuanian nobles. The influence of Polish culture continued to increase, culminating in the Union of Lublin of 1569.

Another significant resolution was the adoption of Polish administrative divisions and offices like voivode and castellan by Lithuania. The union created the Voivodeship of Trakai and Vilnius, governed by two Lithuanian nobles. Former Slavic principalities and duchies largely preserved their old political, social, and administrative features for another century. Kiev Voivodeship was established in 1471, and another five voivodeships were established between 1504 and 1514. This administrative change signified the modernization of the Grand Duchy and a decline of traditional dynastic politics. Previously major regions of the Grand Duchy were ruled by members of the ruling dynasty (siblings, children, cousins, etc. of the Grand Duke). Such principalities remained semi-independent and their rulers could become powerful rivals of the Grand Duke with their own claims to the throne. The new voivodeships were governed by trustworthy nobles, unrelated to the royal clan, who could be easily replaced. Soon the nobility replaced members of the ruling dynasty as the driving force behind Lithuanian politics.

== Adopted Polish coat of arms ==
Arms	Clan	Polish representative	Lithuanian representative
	Abdank	Piotr of Widawa (Judge of Sieradz), Jakub of Rogoźno	Jonas Goštautas
	Bogorya	Marek of Nakola	Stanislovas Visgintas (Stanisław Wyssygin)
	Ciołek	Stanisław of Brzeża (?)	Jonas Eivildas (Jan Ewild)
	Dębno	Dobiesław of Oleśnica (Castellan of Wojnicz)	Kareiva (Wojciech Korejwa) of Sowgotsko
	Doliwa	Maciej Kot (Castellan of Nakielsk), Janusz Furman (Castellan of Międzyrzec), Piotr of Falkowa	Načkus Ginvilaitis
	Dołęga	Unknown	Mantvilas (Monstwild)
	Drya	Janusz of Tuliszków (Castellan of Kalisz)	Mikalojus Tautgirdas (Mikołaj Tawtygierd)
	Działosza	Unknown	Rokutis (Piotr Wołczko Rokutowicz)
	Gierałt	Mikołaj of Gorzków (Bishop of Vilnius)	Surgintas (Surgut z Reszkim)
	Godziemba	Andrzej of Lubraniec (Judge of Kujawy), Andrzej (Pastor of Włocławek)	Stanislovas Butautaitis (Stanisław Butowtowicz)
	Gryf	Unknown	Butautas Mantigaila (Butowt Montygajłowicz)
	Grzymała	Domarat of Kobylan (Castellan of Biecz)	Jonas Rimvydaitis (Jan Rymwidowicz)
	Janina	Maciej (Bishop of Przemyśl), Mikołaj of Suchodół (Judge of Lublin), Piotr of Tura (Judge of Łęczyca)	Voisimas Daneikaitis (Woysym Daneykowicz)
	Jastrzębiec	Wojciech (Bishop of Kraków), Marcin of Lubnica	Nirmedas (Jan Niemira) (Starost of Polotsk)
	Jelita	Klemens of Mokrsko (Castellan of Radom), Florian of Korytnicy (Castellan of Wiślica)	Girdutis (Gerdut)
	Kopacz	Unknown	Getautas (Getowt)
	Korczak	Unknown	Čupa (Czuppa)
	Kot Morski	Unknown	Vaišnoras Vilgailaitis (Wojsznar)
	Leliwa	Jan of Tarnów (Voivode of Kraków), Jadwiga of Leżenic	Albertas Manvydas (Voivode of Vilnius)
	Lis	Krystyn of Kozichgłówy (Castellan of Sącz)	Jonas Sungaila (Sunigajło) (Castellan of Trakai)
	Łodzia	Mościc of Stęszew (Castellan of Poznań)	Micius Vilčkaitis (Miczus Wilczcowicz)
	Łabędź	Dziersław of Skrzynna ?	Gelgantas (Andrzej Goligunt)
	Nałęcz	Sędziwoj of Ostroroga (Voivode of Poznań), Mikołaj of Czarnków (Judge of Poznan)	Kočanas (Koczan)
	Nowina	Mikołaj of Sepna	Mykolas Beinoras (Mikołaj Bejnar)
	Odrowąż	Jan of Szczekociny (Castellan of Lublin)	Vizgirdas (Wyszegerd)
	Ogończyk	Wojciech of Kościola (Castellan of Brzeg), Mikołaj of Taczów	Jurgis Sungaila (Jerzy Sangaw)
	Oksza	Mikołaj of Strzelc (Judge of Sandomierz), Klemens Wątróbka of Strzelc	Minmantas (Jan Minimund Sesnikowicz)
	Ossorya	Mikołaj of Korabiowic	Tverbutas (Twerbud)
	Paprzyca	Unknown	Mažtautas (Mosztołd)
	Pierzchała	Piotr of Włoszczowa (Castellan of Dobrzyn)	Daukša (Dauksza)
	Pobóg	Jakub Koniecpolski (Voivode of Sieradz), Piotr of Popowo	Ralys (Rało)
	Pomian	Jan Pella (Bishop of Włocławek)	Stanislovas Sakas (Stanisław Sak)
	Poraj	Micał of Michałow (Voivode of Sandomierz), Jaka (Judge of Kalisz)	Mykolas Bilminas (Mikołaj Bylimin)
	Półkozic	Jan of Rzeszów (Bishop of Lviv), Jan Ligęza of Bobrku (Voivode of Łęczyca), Micha of Bogumiłowice (Castellan of Sandomierz), Jan of Bogumiłowice (Castellan of Czchów), Paweł of Bogumiłowice (Judge of Kraków), Marcin of Wrocimowice (Chorąży of Kraków)	Valčkus Kulva (Wołczko Kulwa)
	Rawicz	Krystyn of Ostrów (Castellan of Kraków), Grot of Jankowice (Castellan of Małogojszcz)	Mykolas Mingaila (Castellan of Vilnius)
	Rola	Jan of Łąkoszyn (Castellan of Łęczyca), Mikołaj of ...	Dangelis (Daugel)
	Sulima	Stanisław Gamrat of Klimuntowic (Castellan of Połaniec)	Radivilas (Rodywił)
	Syrokomla	Jakub of Kurdwanowa (Bishop of Płock)	Jokūbas Mingaila (Jakub Minigajło)
	Szreniawa	Jan of Łańcuchów and Grodziny (Castellan of Zawichost)	Jadautas (Jadat)
	Świnka	Unknown	Andrius Daukantas (Andrzej Dewknotowicz)
	Topór	Maciej of Wąsosz (Voivode of Kalisz)	Jonas Butrimas from Žirmūnai
	Trąby	Mikołaj Trąba (Archbishop of Gniezno)	Kristinas Astikas
	Trzaska	Unknown	Vaidila Kušulaitis (Wojdyło Kuszulowicz)
	Wadwicz	Jan Mężyk of Dąbrowy	Petras Mantigirdaitis
	Wąż	Unknown	Kočanas Sukaitis (Konczan Sukowicz)
	Zadora	Zbigniew of Brzezia (Crown Marshall)	Jaunius Valimantaitis, Voivode of Trakai (the Kęsgaila family is descended from his younger brother Mykolas Kęsgaila)
	Zaremba	Jan of Królików (Castellan of Gniezno), Marcin of Kalinów (Castellan of Sieradz)	Gineitis Koncaitis
