= House of Kęsgaila =

Lithuanian noble family

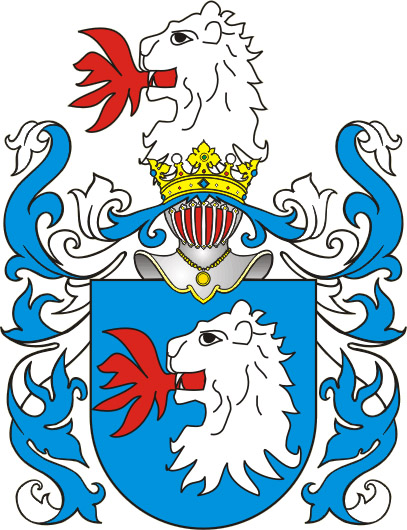
Zadora coat of arms, the coat of arms of the family

The Kęsgaila family (pl. Kęsgailos) was a Lithuanian noble family, one of the largest landowners in the Grand Duchy of Lithuania. The family descended from the land of Deltuva and its roots trace to the 14th century (a semi-legendary Buseika (Lithuanian sources: Buška, Polish sources: Buszka) is considered the ancestor of the family). Their seat was in the Samogitia and Trakai regions. Kęsgailos family members had been the Elders of Samogitia from 1412 until 1532.

According to the 1528 census of the Grand Duchy of Lithuania, the family had to provide the most troops in the Grand Duchy of Lithuania. The family died out in the 16th century, the last member of the family was Stanislovas, a close friend of Grand Duke Sigismund II Augustus and supporter of his marriage with Barbara Radziwiłł.

== Name ==
The name Kęsgaila comes from the native first name of Mykolas Kęsgaila (son of Valimantas, son of Bushka) whose elder brother Jaunutis son of Valimantas was granted the Zadora coat of arms in the Union of Horodło of 1413. In line with the common practice for nobles' names after the Christianization of Lithuania, after his baptism, the Christian name *Mīkālas (Michael) was added to a pagan Lithuanian name, which can be reconstructed as *Kensgaĭla (from kęsti ("be patient") and gailas ("strong")). His son Jonas Kęsgailaitis, mentioned in written sources in Latin as Johannes Kyensgalowicz, was a bearer of the name as a patronymic, which subsequently evolved into a family name. Its Polonized form Kieżgajło is most common in Polish historiography over other variants, such as Kezigal, Kieżgajłła, Gezgajło, Kiezgajło, Kieżgajłło, Kierżgajłło, Kieżgałło and Kieżgało. Kęsgaila (plural Kęsgailos) is a modern Lithuanian spelling of the original family name.

== Family tree ==
Family is presented based on Rimvydas Petrauskas.

Family of House of Kęsgaila

Buškys or Buseika
Valimantas
Rumbaudas; Died in 1432; Grand Marshal of Lithuania	Kęsgaila; Died c. 1449; Elder of Samogitia	Jaunius; Died in 1432; Voivode of Trakai	Gudiginas	Šedbaras; Died in 1432? Starosta of Kaunas	Sudovijus; Died in 1459; Starosta of Kaunas
Mykolas	Konradas Gudigirdaitis (had issue)	Zaviša Gudigirdaitis (had issue)	Stankus; Died before 1481; Starosta of Hrodna	NN daughter Wife of Jonas Vėževičius
Mykolas Kęsgaila; Died in 1476; Grand Chancellor of Lithuania	Jonas Kęsgaila; Died in 1485; Elder of Samogitia	Petras Kęsgaila	Dobka Kęsgaila; Died c. 1460	Butrimas Kęsgaila; Died before 1445	Dorota; Wife of Jonas Goštautas	Milochna; Wife of Petras Gedgaudas	NN daughter Wife of Ivan Ilinicz
Mykolas Kęsgaila; Died in 1512; Grand Marshal of Lithuania	Stanislovas Kęsgaila; Died in 1527; Elder of Samogitia	Helena; Wife of Jurgis Mantautaitis	NN daughter Wife of Ivan Jurscha	Anna?
Mykolas Kęsgaila; Died in 1523	Jonas Kęsgaila	Stanislovas Kęsgaila; Died in 1532; Elder of Samogitia	Barbora; Wife of Jan Janowicz Zabrzeziński
Stanislovas Kęsgaila; Died in 1554; Last male heir
