= Rumbaudas Valimantaitis =

Lithuanian noble (died 1432)

Rumbaudas Valimantaitis (Polish: Rumbold [Lambert] Wolimuntowicz; died in 1432) was an influential Lithuanian noble of Zadora coat of arms. He was a son of Valimantas and brother of Mykolas Kęsgaila. He became Elder of Samogitia (1409–1411) and grand marshal (1412–1432).

He first appears in written sources as a witness to the Pact of Vilnius of January 1401. His patrimony was in Deltuva, but he also had possessions in Samogitia and volost of Svislach. In 1409, he became Elder of Samogitia and instigated the Second Samogitian Uprising on orders of Vytautas, Grand Duke of Lithuania. The uprising grew into the Polish–Lithuanian–Teutonic War and it is believed that Rumbaudas commanded Samogitian troops in the Battle of Grunwald (1410). After the war, he became Grand Marshal of Lithuania while his brother Mykolas Kęsgaila became Elder of Samogitia. In 1413, he was among Lithuanian nobles negotiating the status of Samogitia with Benedict Makrai, a mediator appointed by Sigismund of Luxemburg. In 1422, he witnessed the Treaty of Melno. In 1422/1423 he is mentioned as Elder of Vitebsk. In 1429–1430, he was sent to Poland to negotiate coronation of Vytautas as King of Lithuania.

After the death of Vytautas and during the Lithuanian Civil War (1431–1435), Rumbaudas was taken captive by the Poles, but was released. He first supported Sigismund Kęstutaitis. After the coup against Švitrigaila in August 1432, Sigismund even appointed Jaunius, brother of Rumbaudas, as Voivode of Vilnius. However, already at the end of 1432, Rumbaudas participated in a failed plot against Sigismund. For that he and Jaunius were executed.

Only one son of Rumbaudas is known, Michael, who was mentioned in written sources only once and did not participate in politics.
