= Lithuania proper =

Region of Lithuania

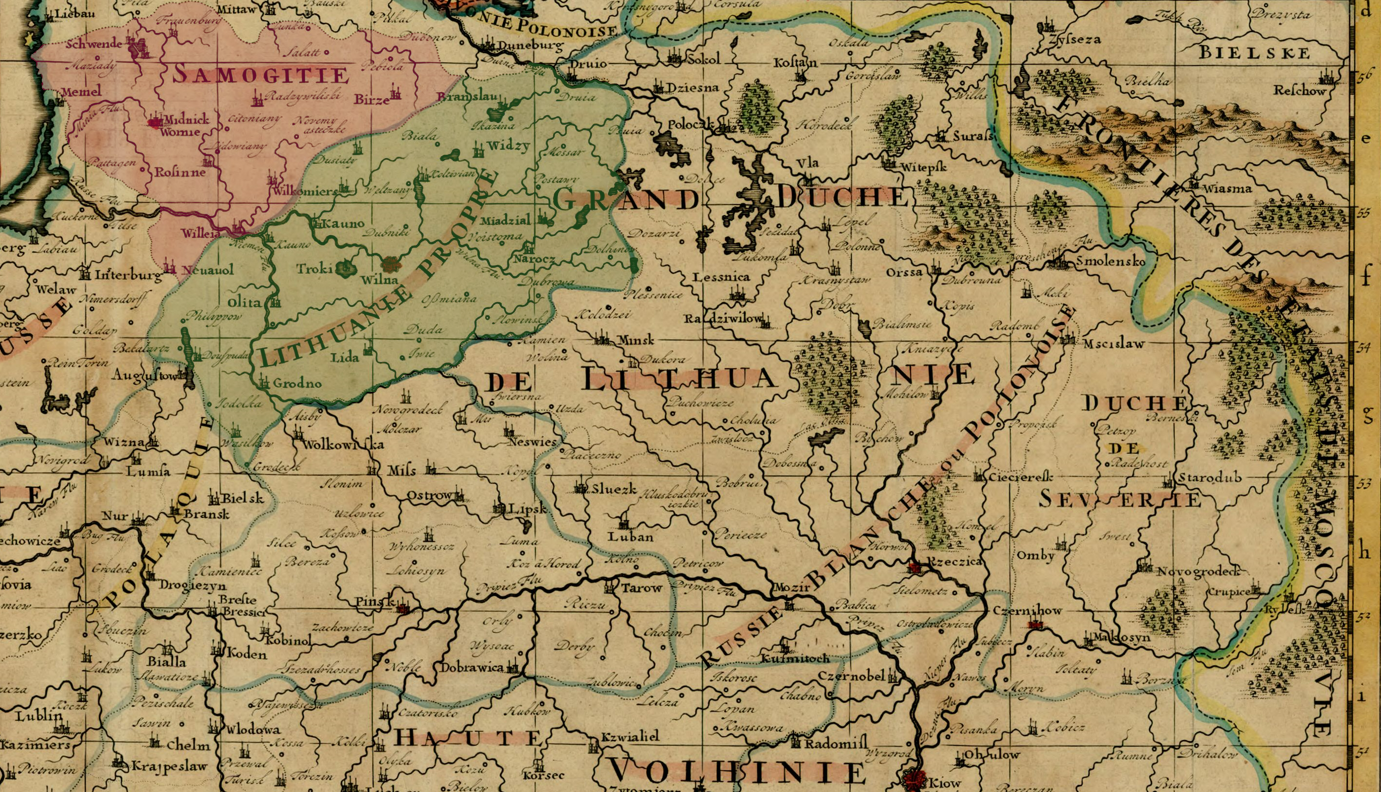
Lithuania proper (in green) and Samogitia (in red) within the Grand Duchy of Lithuania in a map from 1712

Lithuania proper (Note: Latin: Lithuania propria; Lithuanian: Tikroji Lietuva, Didžioji Lietuva; Polish: Litwa ścisła, Litwa Właściwa or Litwa Rdzenna; Russian: собственная Литовская земля, lit. 'sobstvennaja Litovskaja zemlja' or Коренная Литва; Belarusian: Літоўская зямля, romanized: Litowskaja ziamla; Yiddish: ליטע, romanized: Lite; Danish: egentlig Litauen; German: Eigentliches Litauen; French: Lituanie propre) refers to a region that existed within the Grand Duchy of Lithuania where the Lithuanian language was spoken. The primary meaning is identical to the Duchy of Lithuania, a land around which the Grand Duchy of Lithuania evolved. The territory can be traced by Catholic Christian parishes established in pagan Baltic lands of the Grand Duchy of Lithuania subsequent to the Christianization of Lithuania in 1387. Lithuania proper (Lithuania Propria) was always distinguished from the Ruthenian lands since the Lithuanians differed from the Ruthenians in their language and faith (Paganism in the beginning and Catholicism since 1387). The term in Latin was widely used during the Middle Ages and can be found in numerous historical maps until World War I.

Lithuania proper is sometimes also called Lithuania Major, particularly in contrast with Lithuania Minor.

The Lithuanian geographer Kazys Pakštas wrote that Lithuania proper was known since the administrative division of the Grand Duchy of Lithuania in 1566, when the name was assigned to the palatinates of Vilnius and Trakai. The name was used in documents and maps. Lithuania proper also included the Duchy of Samogitia.

== Evolution of the term ==
=== Before the Grand Duchy of Lithuania ===
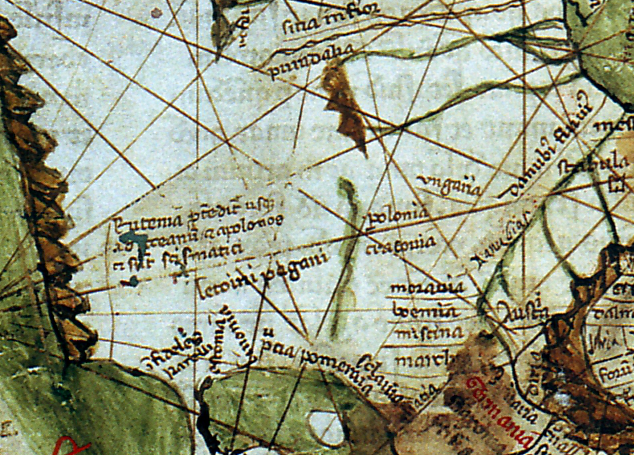
Lithuania in the Mappa mundi of Pietro Vesconte, 1321. The inscription reads: Letvini pagani - pagan Lithuanians.

A few Baltic confederations from the second half of the 12th century and the 13th century are known.

Historians designate Lithuania proper (or the Land of Lithuania in a narrow sense) as a Lithuanian land that existed prior to Grand Duchy of Lithuania, near other lands: Land of Nalšia, Land of Deltuva, Land of Upytė. According to Henryk Łowmiański, Lithuania proper was in the nucleus of future Trakai Voivodeship between rivers: Nemunas, Neris and Merkys. Tomas Baranauskas suggests that Lithuania proper was around Ašmena area, ethnic Lithuanian lands in modern Belarus. According to Belarusian writer Mikola Yermalovich (although his reliability is questioned by scholars) Lithuania (Belarusian: Летапiсная Лiтва, literary: Lithuania of chronicles) was in the upper Nemunas region, now in modern Belarus.

=== In the Grand Duchy of Lithuania ===
Scholars often use the term Lithuania proper to refer to lands inhabited by ethnic Lithuanians as opposed to lands controlled by the Grand Duchy of Lithuania inhabited by Ruthenians (ancestors of modern Belarusians and Ukrainians), Poles, Lithuanian Jews or many other nationalities. Already during the Grand Duchy times, Lithuania proper was a term designated to land where Lithuanians live. Administratively, it consisted of Vilnius Voivodeship, Trakai Voivodeship and the Duchy of Samogitia. This division continued even after the Polish–Lithuanian Commonwealth was partitioned. Thus, the Grand Duchy of Lithuania was divided into the historical regions Samogitia (literally Lower Lithuania), Lithuania proper and Ruthenia.

=== Eastern part of Lithuania Propria ===
For centuries, eastern and southern lands of this territory, that had direct contacts with Ruthenia and Poland, initially inhabited by ethnic Lithuanians were slowly Ruthenised, Polonised and Russified, and the Lithuanian-speaking territory shrunk. Eastern parts of Lithuania Propria suffered heavy population losses during the Deluge, and further on during the Great Northern War and following plague epidemic in 1710–1711. Subsequent immigration of Ruthenians and Poles into these territories accelerated the process. A significant push to the de-Lithuanisation ensued when Lithuania became a part of the Russian Empire, and especially, after Lithuanian language books were forbidden to print in Latin letters in 1864. The process continued at the time of Polish rule, as Lithuanian language schools and libraries were closed, and later under Soviet rule, as no Lithuanian schools were in these territories at all. Nowadays significant "islands" of Lithuanian-speaking people remain in eastern and southern parts of Lithuania proper (modern Belarus (see Gervėčiai and Pelesa in Grodno Region) and Poland (see Punskas in Podlaskie Voivodeship). Many people of these territories now speaking Belarusian still refer to themselves as Lithuanians.

Lithuania proper in maps

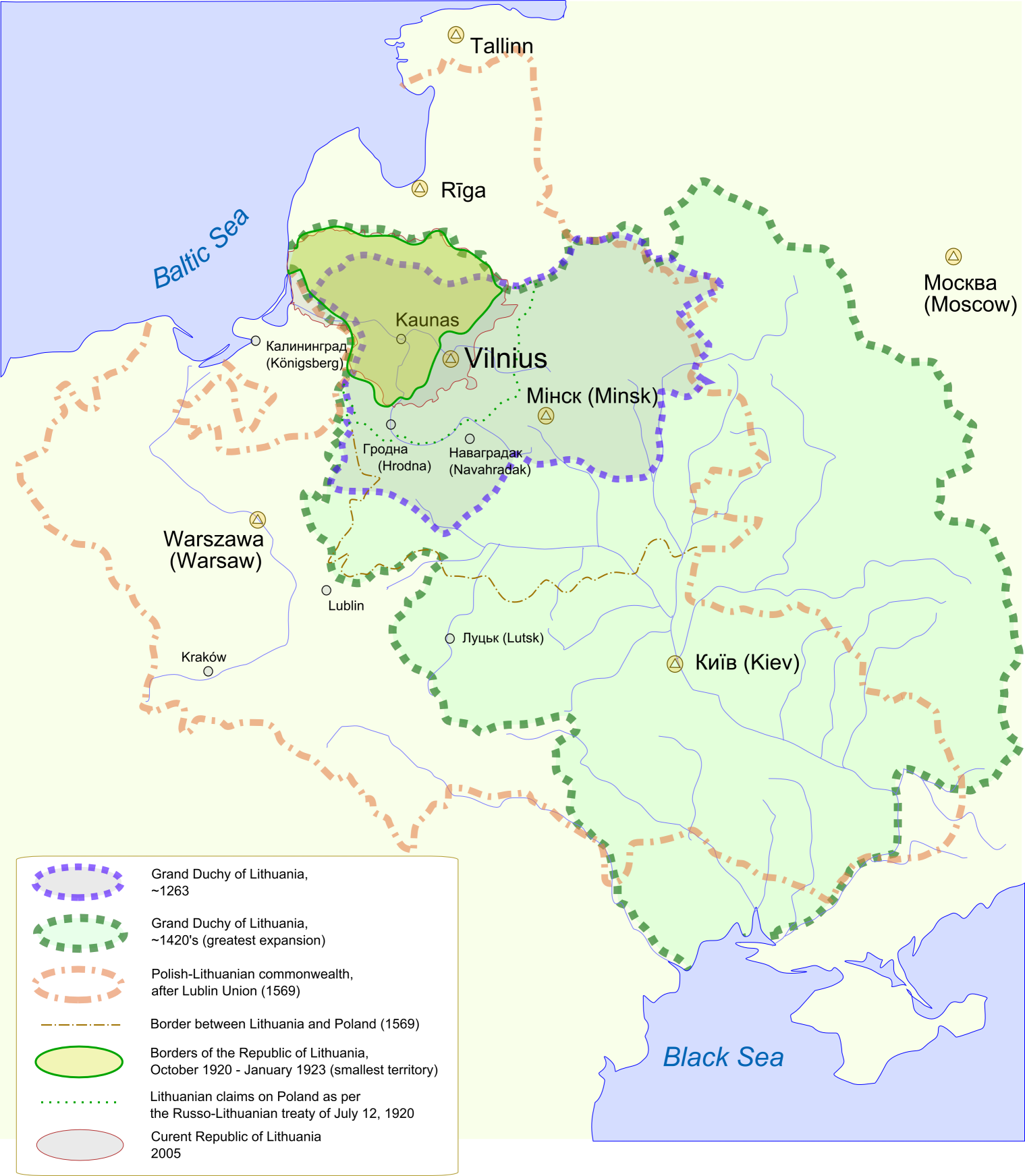
Map showing territorial changes of Lithuania from the 13th century to the present day

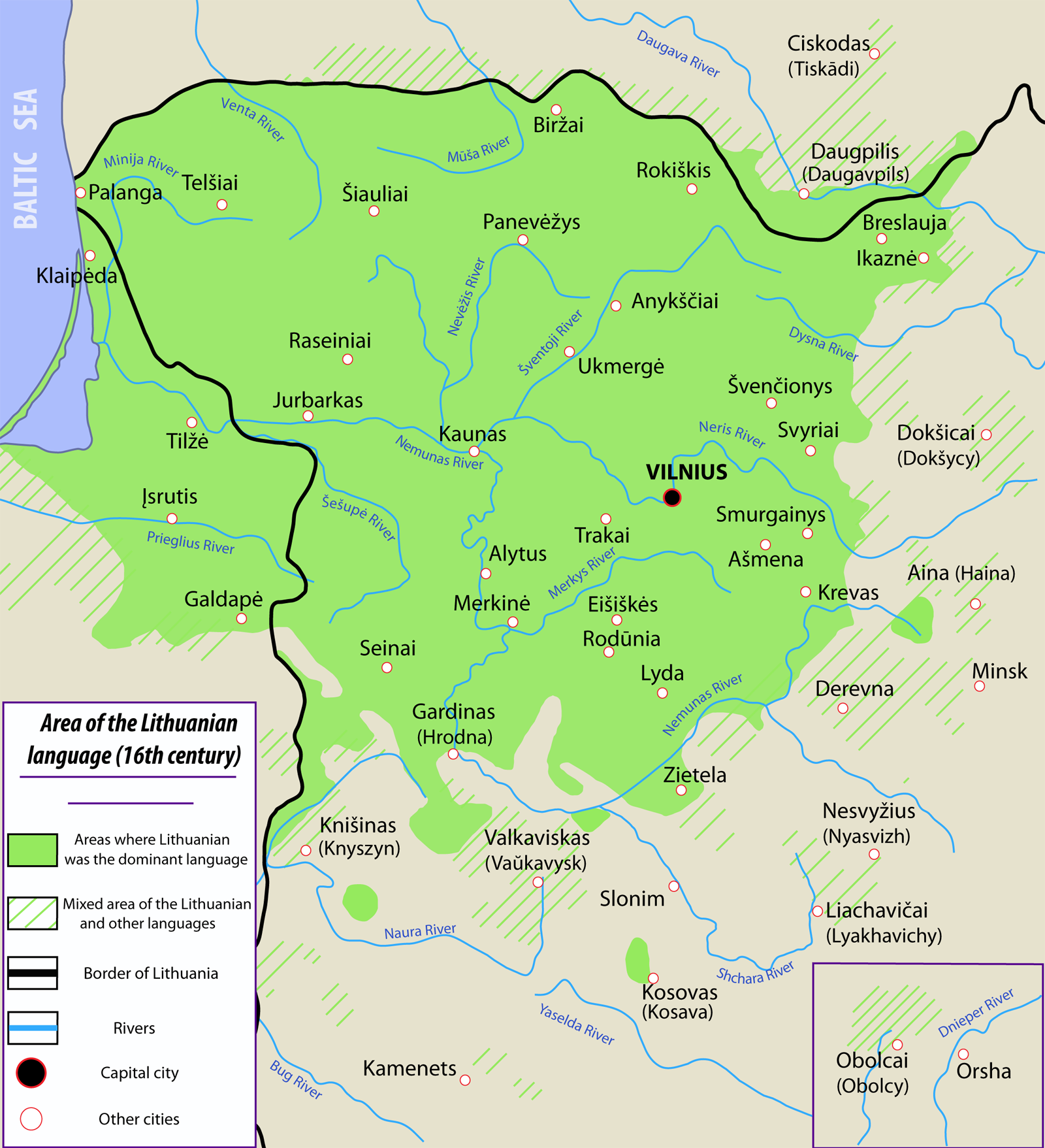
Area of the Lithuanian language in the 16th century

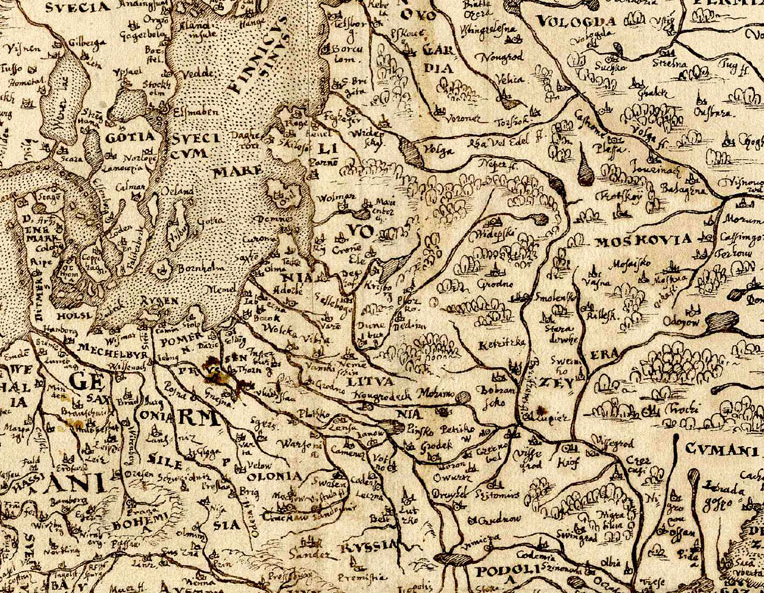
Lithuania on a 1570 map

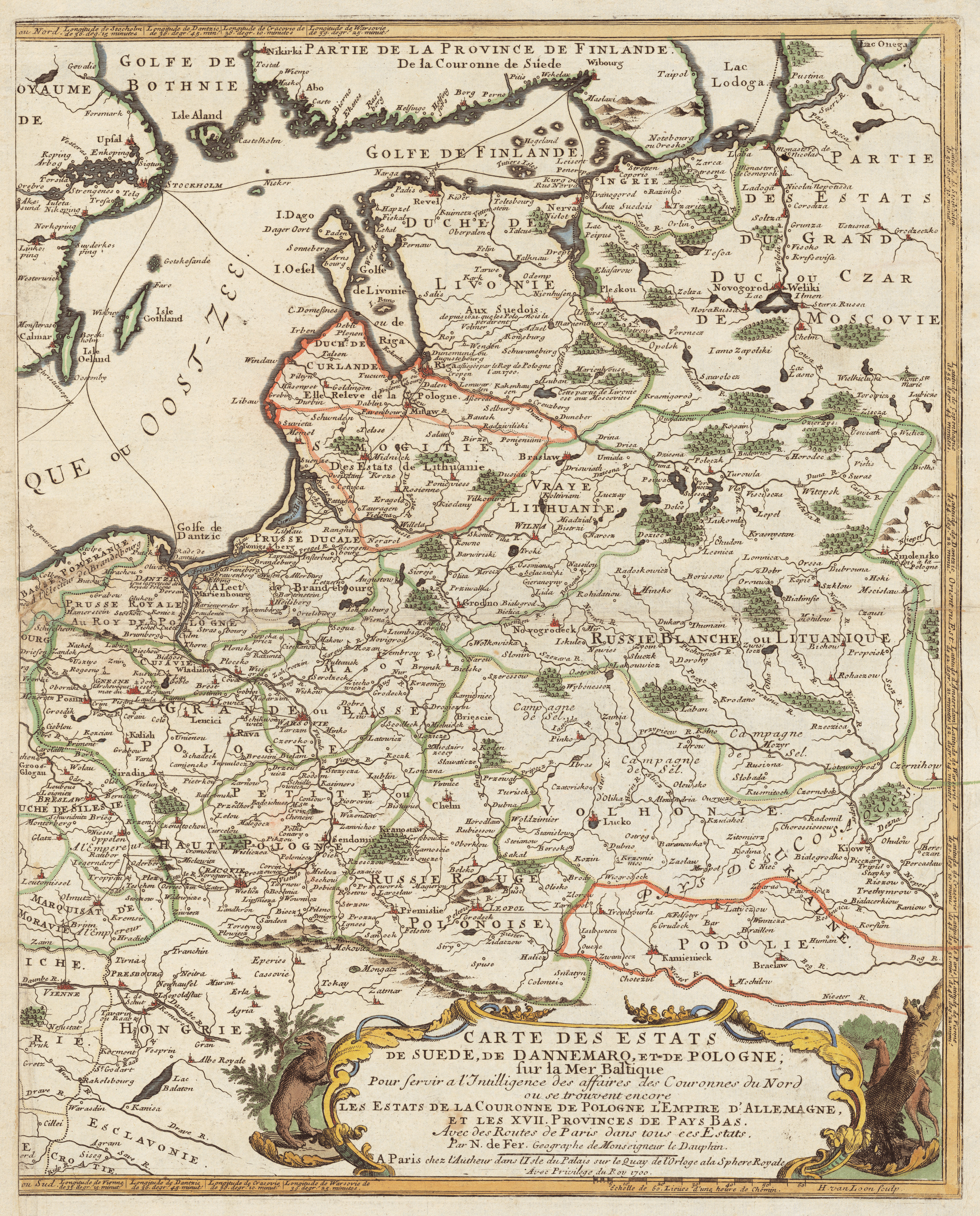
Polish–Lithuanian Commonwealth in 1700 with Samogitia (Samogitie), Lithuania proper (Vraye Lithuanie) and Lithuanian White Ruthenia (Russie Blanche ou Lituanique)

1716 map of the Polish–Lithuanian Commonwealth with Lithuania proper (Vraye Lithuanie)

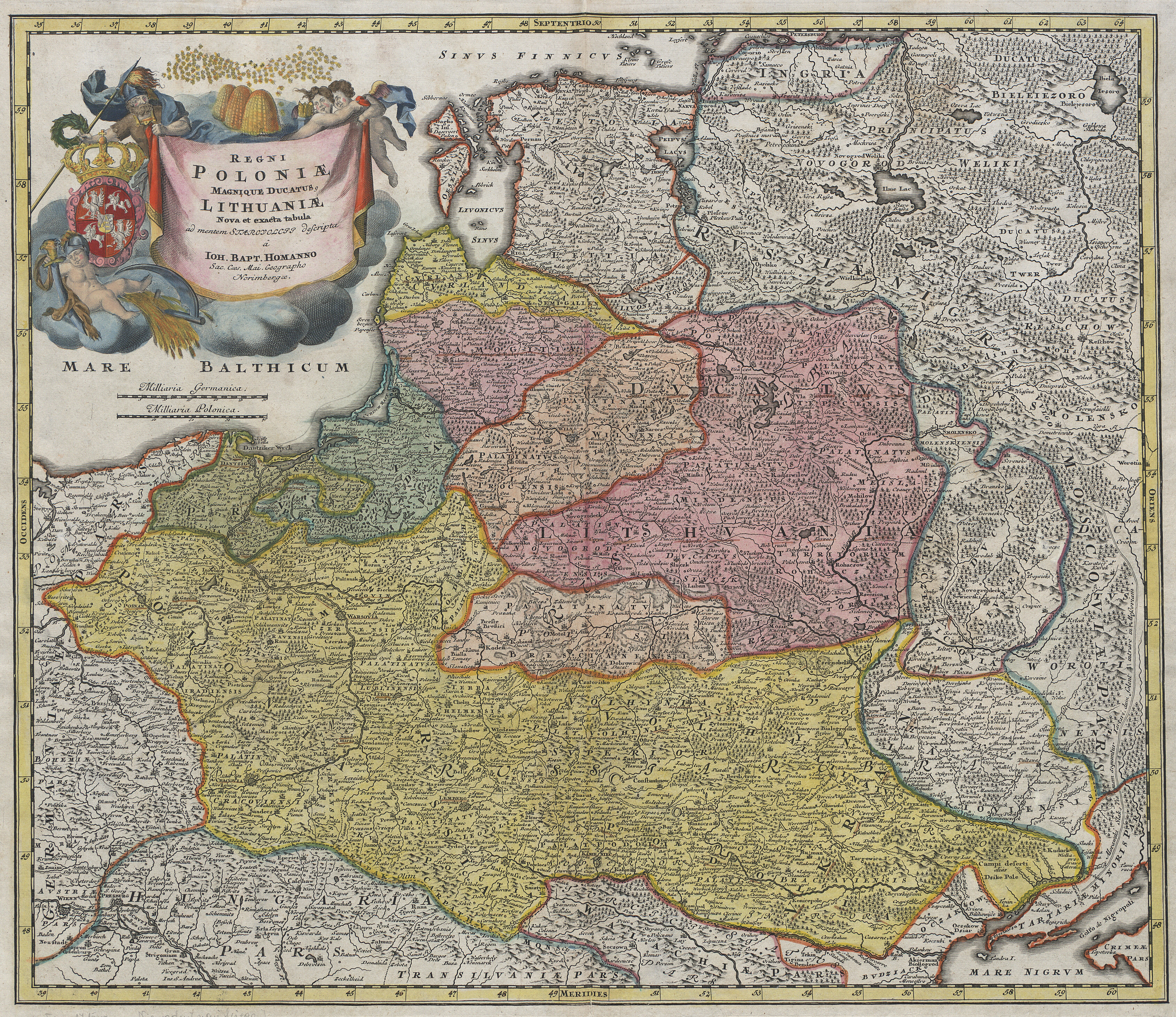
Map of Kingdom of Poland and Grand Duchy of Lithuania in 1720 with Lithuania proper

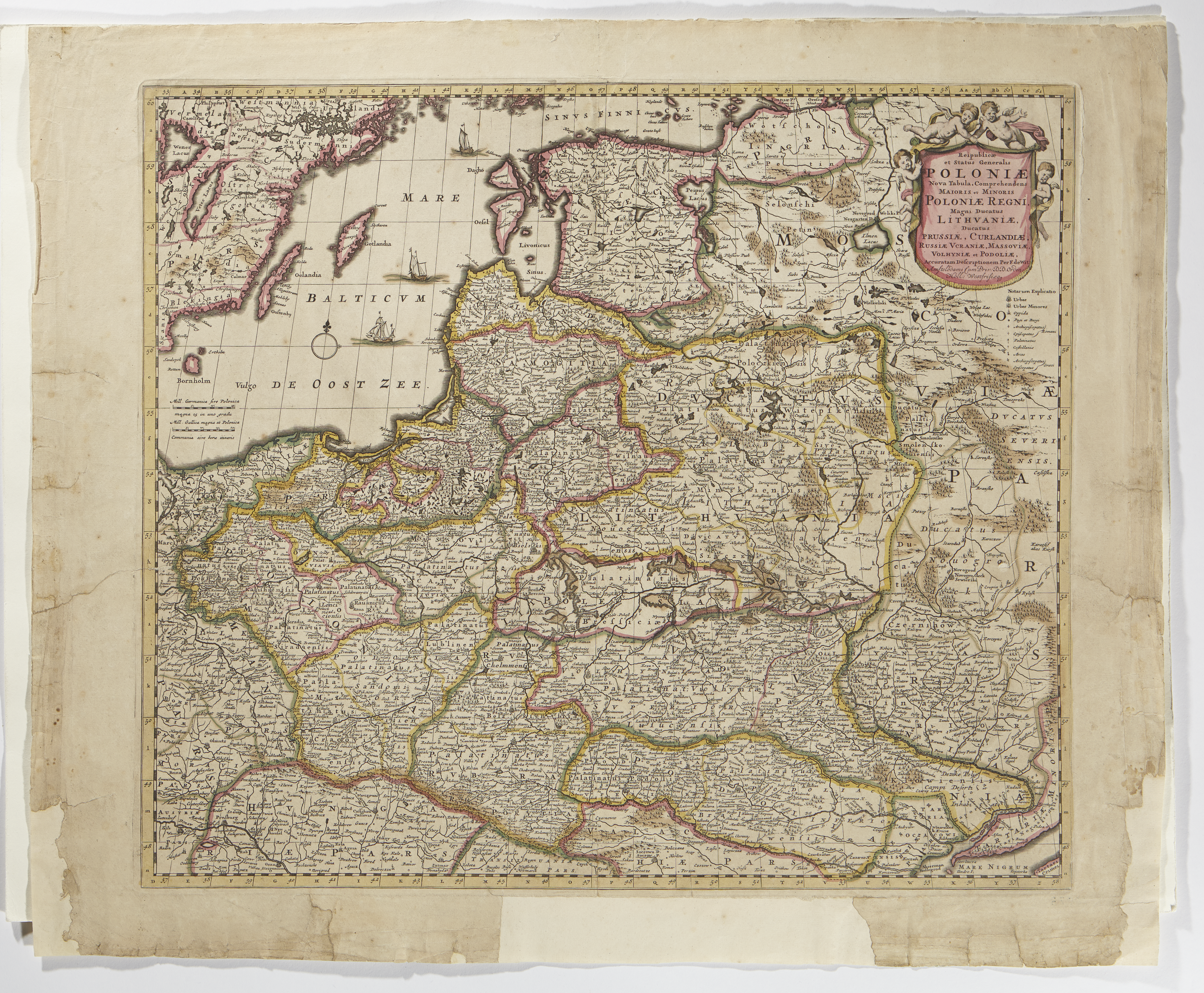
18th century map of Poland–Lithuania with Lithuania proper

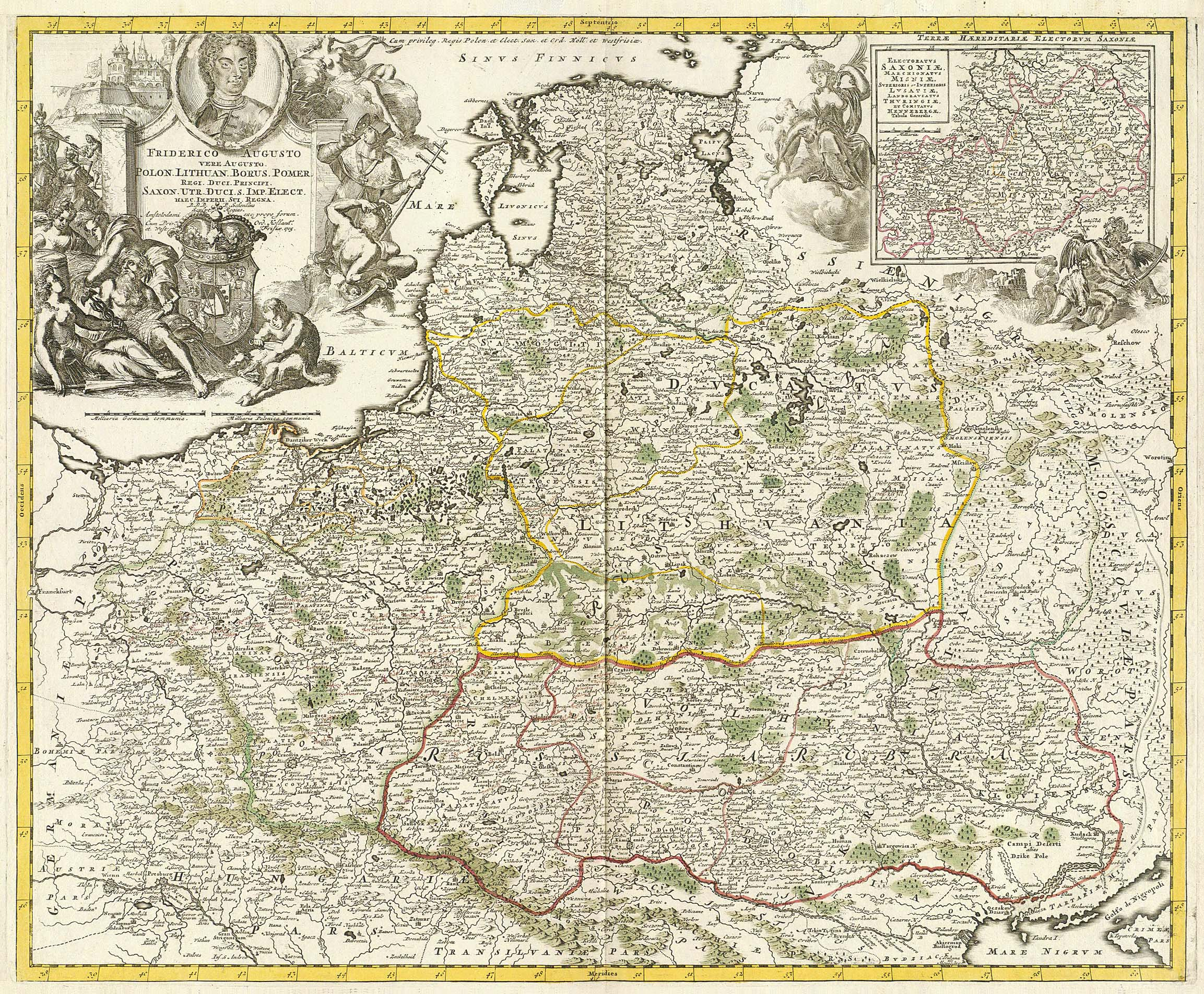
1733 map of the Kingdom of Poland and the Grand Duchy of Lithuania at the time of Augustus II the Strong with Lithuania proper

Map of northern, central and eastern Europe in 1737 with Lithuania proper (Lithuanie Particuliere)

1773 map of the Polish–Lithuanian Commonwealth with Lithuania proper

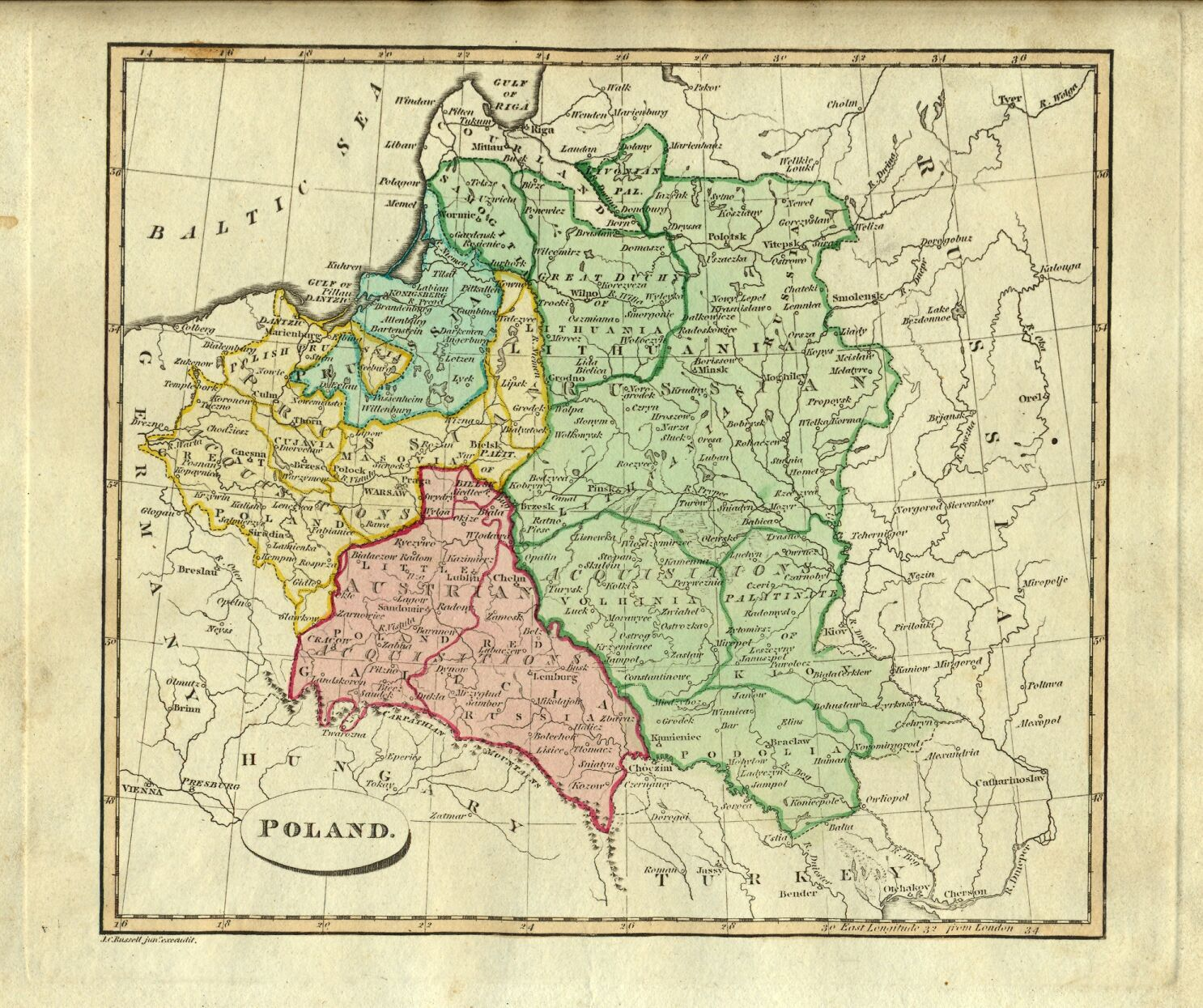
1814 map of the partitioned Commonwealth with Lithuania proper (Duchy of Lithuania)

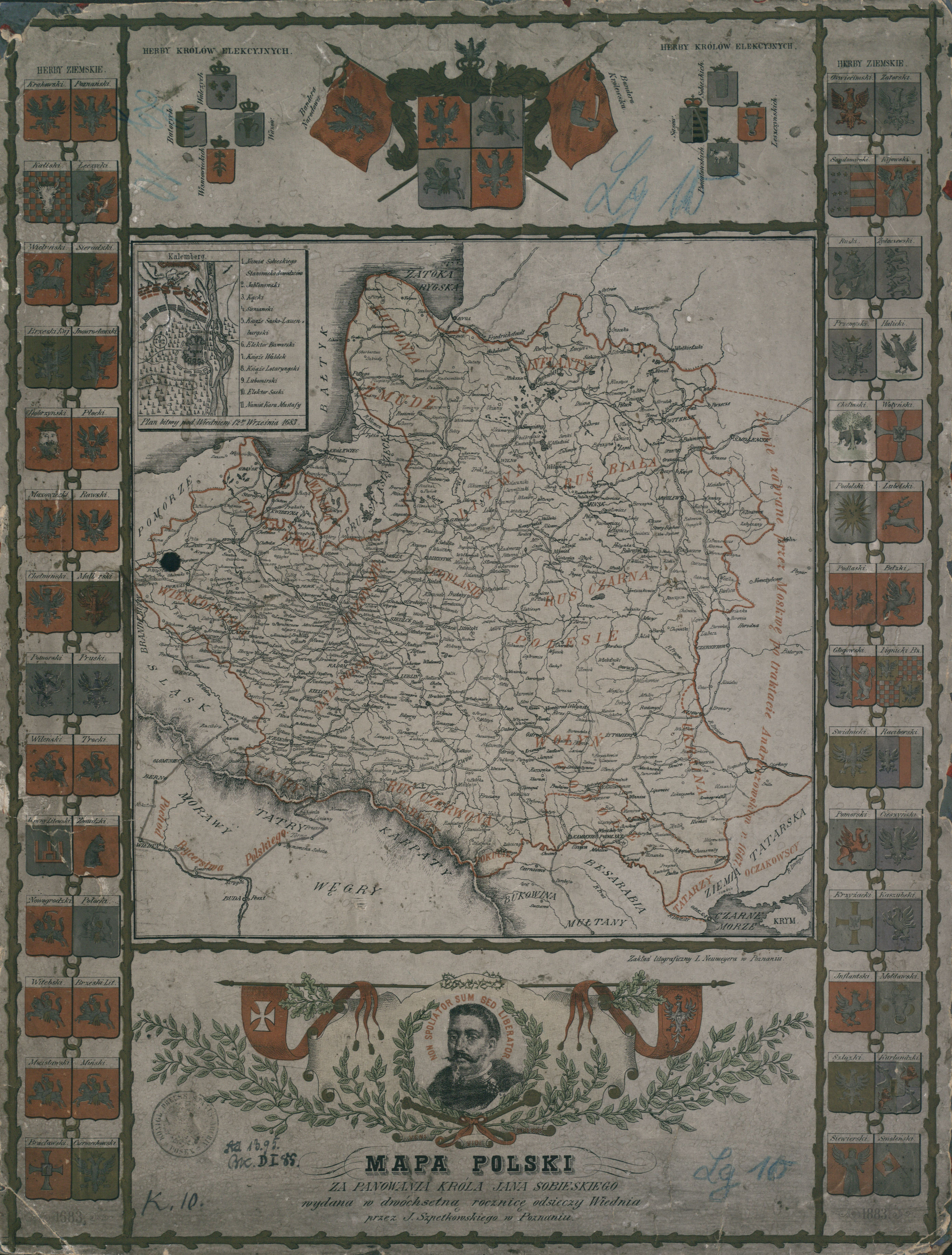
1883 map of the Polish–Lithuanian Commonwealth with Lithuania proper (Litwa)

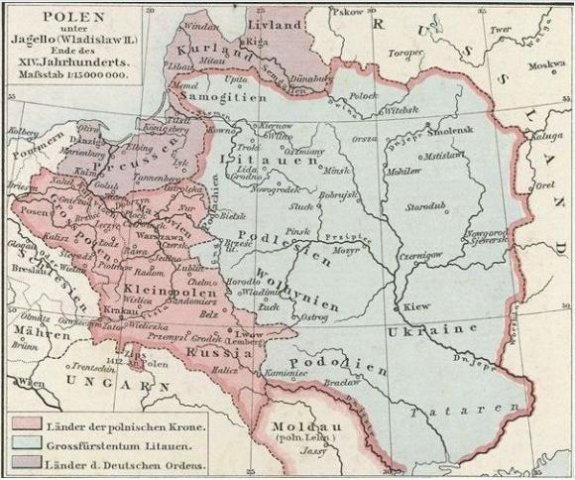
1886 map of Poland and Lithuania during the 14th century with Lithuania proper (Litauen)

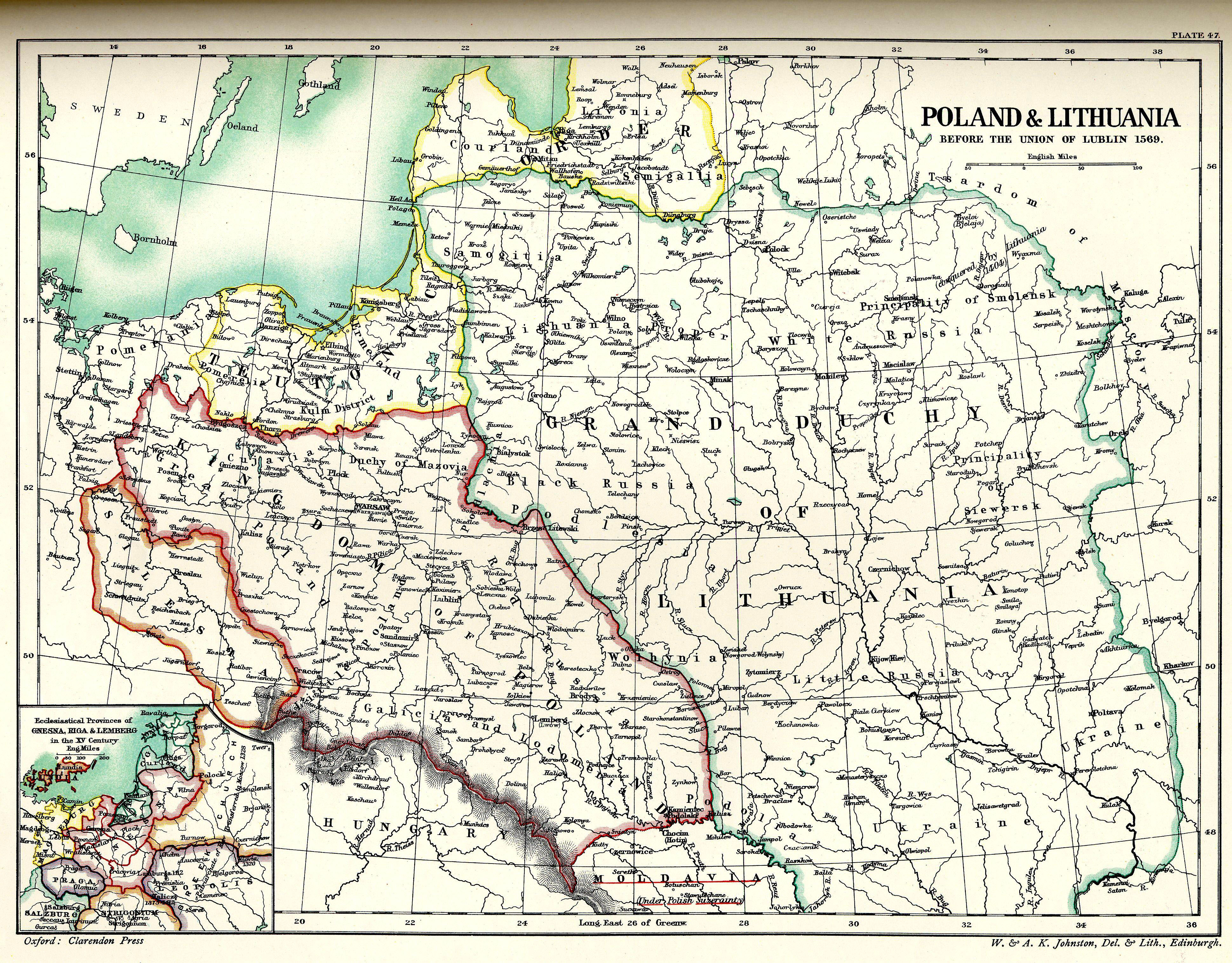
1888 map of Poland and Lithuania circa 1560, before the Union of Lublin (1569) with Lithuania proper

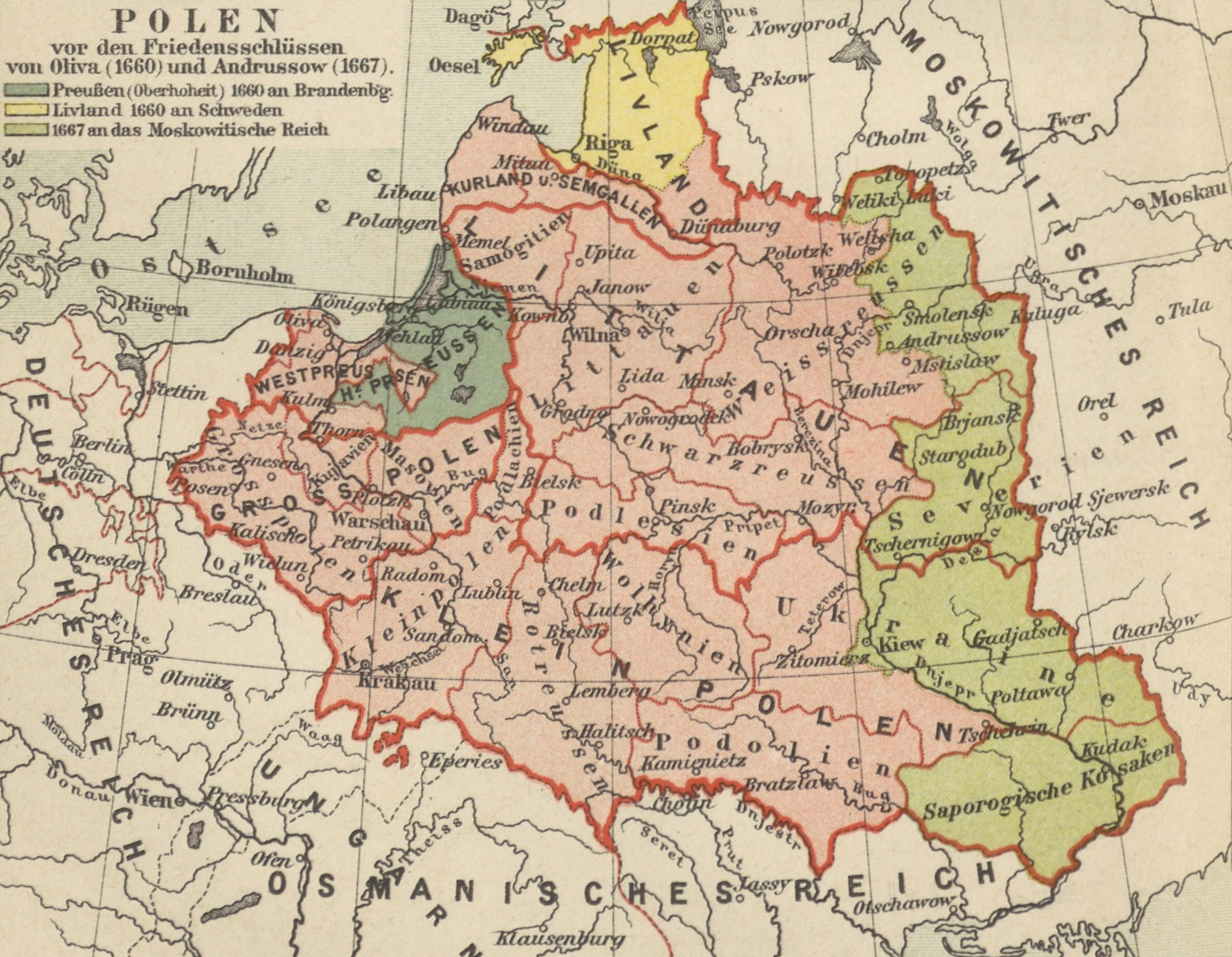
1890 map of the Polish–Lithuanian Commonwealth between 1660 and 1667 with Lithuania proper

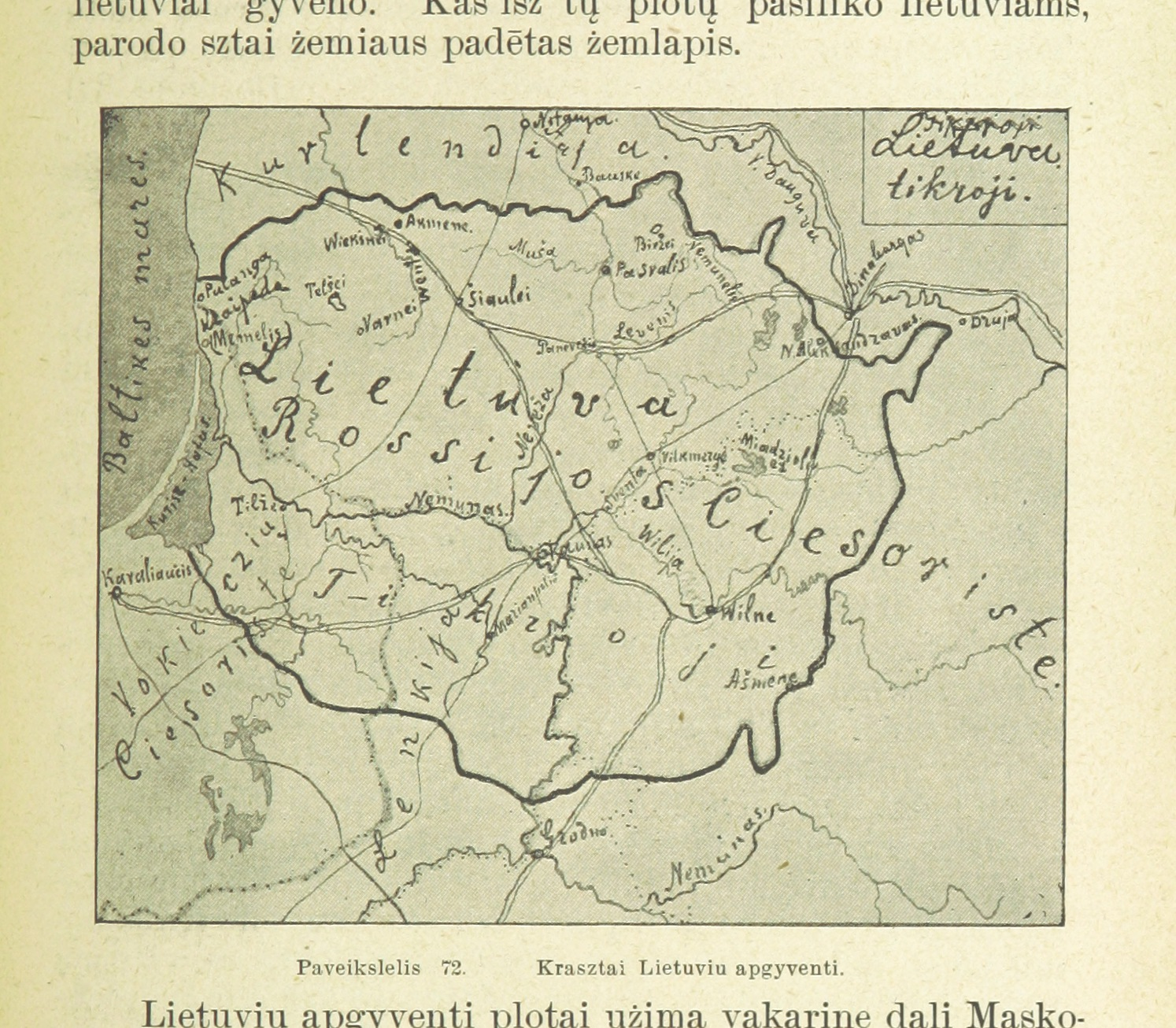
1899 map of Lithuania Proper (Lietuva tikroji) from a Lithuanian language atlas "Geografija arba Żemēs Apraszymas. Pagal Geikie, Nalkowskį ir kitus. Sutaise szernas".

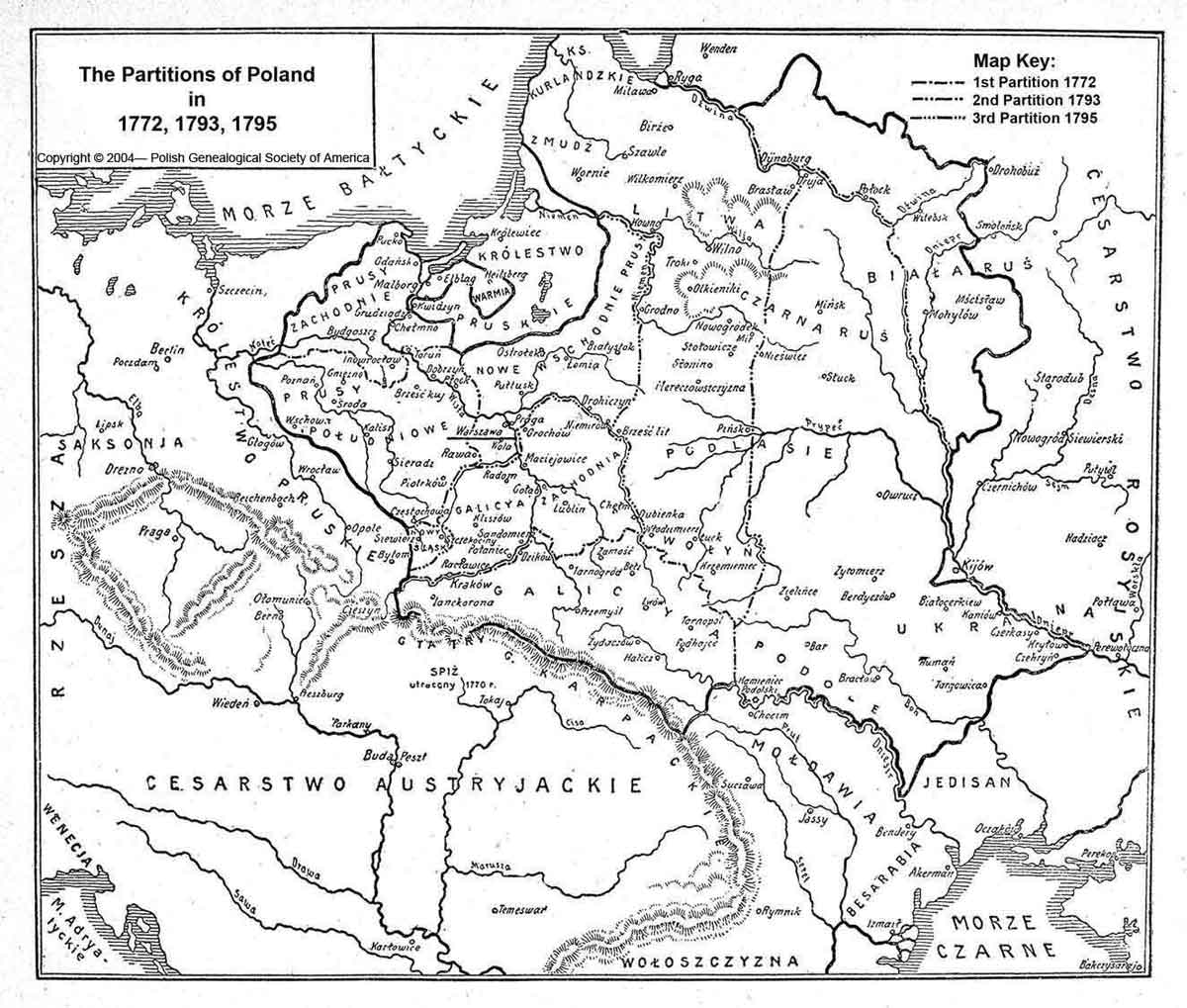
1910 map from the Historical Atlas of Poland with Lithuania proper (Litwa)

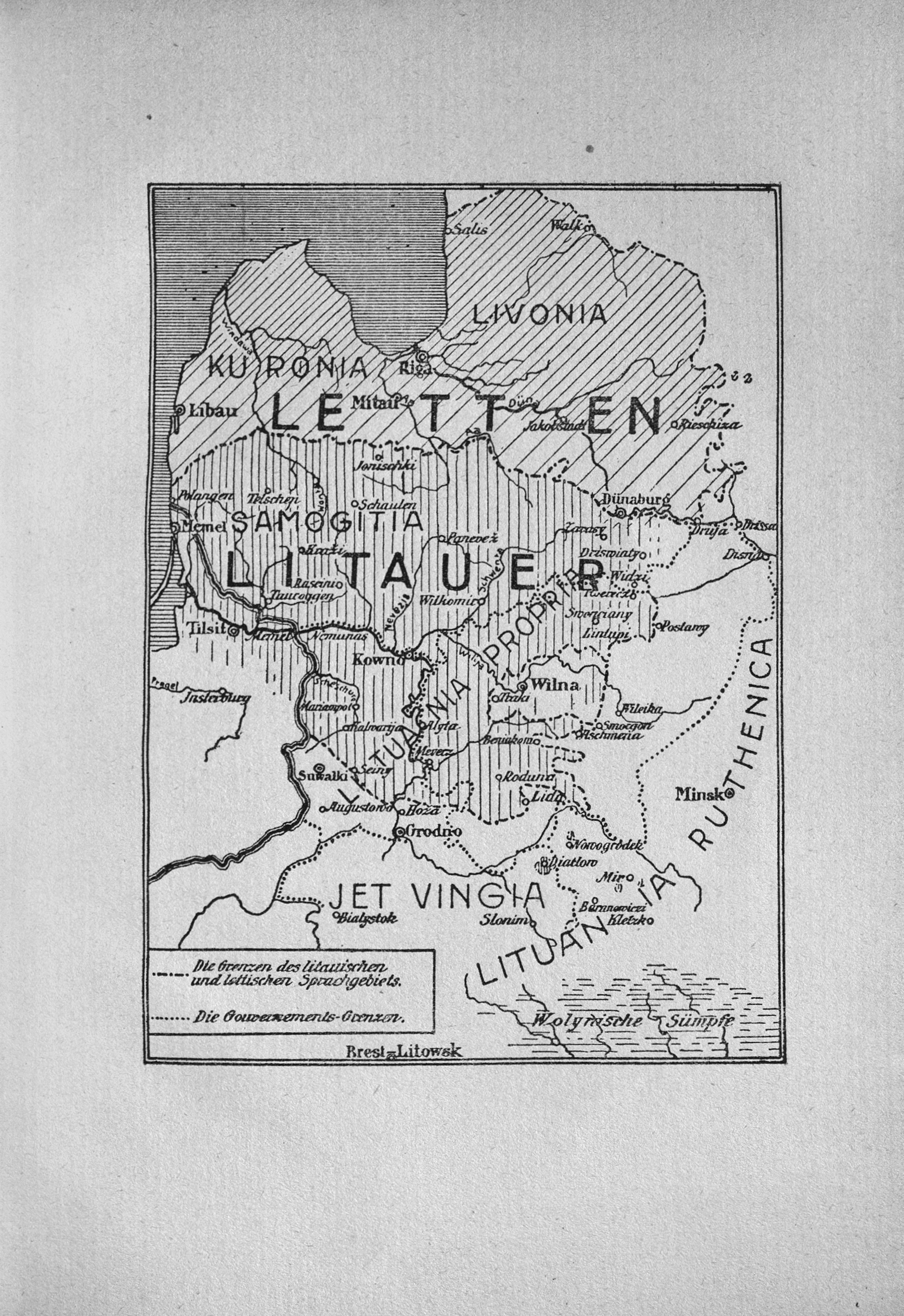
1918 ethnographic map of Balts by the Leibniz Institute for East and Southeast European Studies with Lithuania proper and Lithuanian Ruthenia

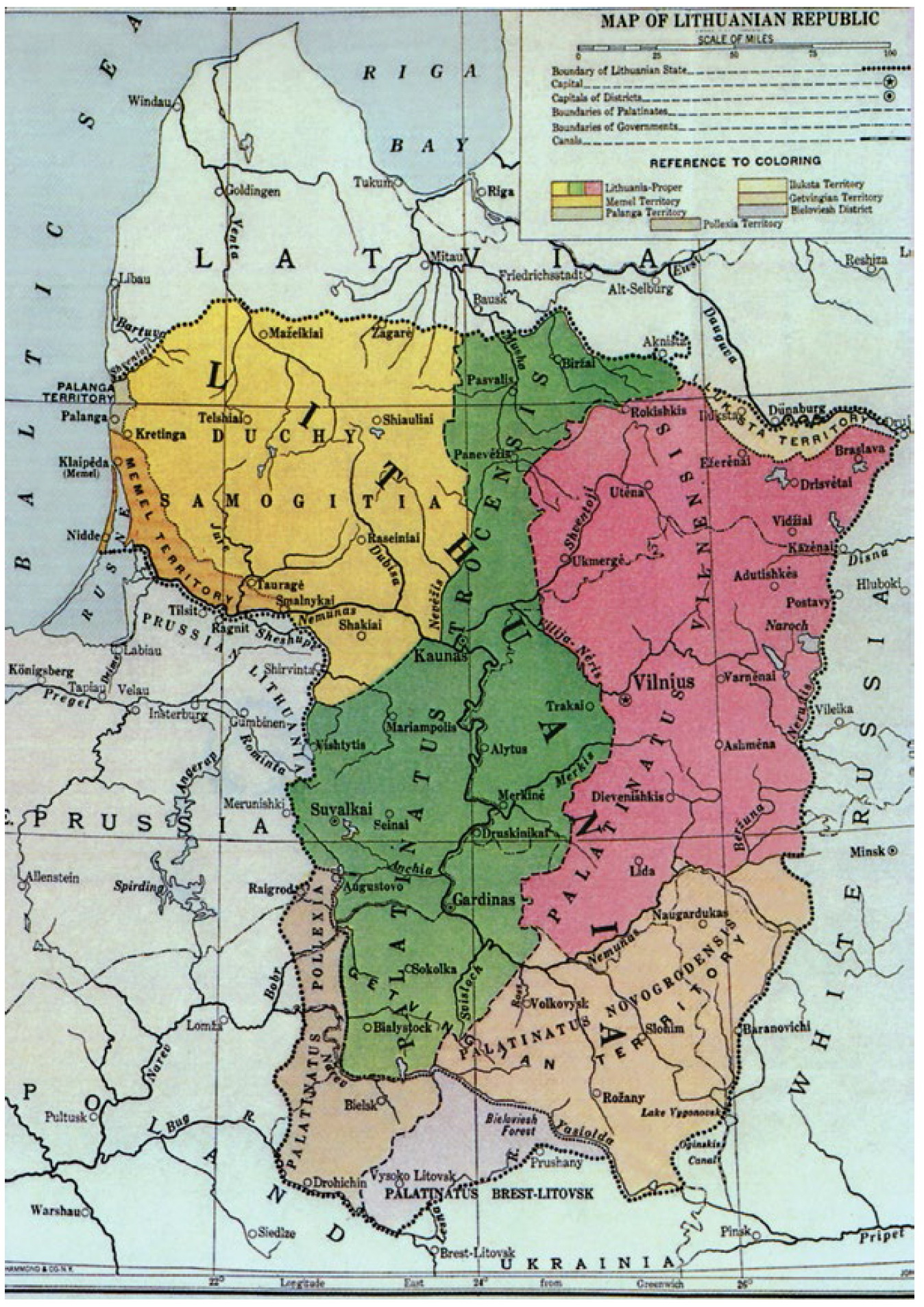
A territorial project of Lithuania in 1920 with Vilnius Voivodeship, Trakai Voivodeship and Samogitian Eldership listed under Lithuania Proper

=== Modern developments ===
At the end of World War I, the Council of Lithuania declared an independent Lithuanian state re-established in the ethnic Lithuanian lands.

After negotiations with Bolshevik Russia, a large part of Lithuania proper was acknowledged by Soviets as part of the Lithuanian Republic by signing the Soviet-Lithuanian Treaty of 1920. Some of these territories were also claimed by the Second Republic of Poland. This led to series of military conflicts and eventually to war.

In 1943, Antanas Smetona (in exile at the time) began working on a study "Lithuania Propria". The book was dedicated to the history of Lithuanian lands before Polonisation, Russification, and Germanisation, hoping that it would help to substantiate a claim to unreturned territories in a peace conference after World War II. His work was left unfinished, and for a long time was available only as a manuscript and was virtually unknown.

Currently the Republic of Lithuania has no territorial claims.

== See also ==
- Duchy of Lithuania
- Bruno of Querfurt
- Ethnographic Lithuania
- Lithuanians in Belarus

== Sources ==
- Gaučas, P. (1986). "К вопросу о восточных и южных границах литовской этнической территории в средневековье" [On the issue of the eastern and southern borders of the Lithuanian ethnic territory in the Middle Ages] (PDF). Балто-славянские исследования (in Russian). Moscow: Nauka: 195–213.
- Gimžauskas, E. (2001). "The Belorussian Factor in the Genesis of the Modern Lithuanian State, 1915-1917". Lithuanian Historical Studies. 6 (1): 107–126. doi:10.30965/25386565-00601006. ISSN 1392-2343. S2CID 251242686.
- Stone, Daniel Z. (2014). The Polish-Lithuanian State, 1386-1795. University of Washington Press. ISBN 9780295803623.
- Frost, Robert (2015). The Oxford History of Poland-Lithuania. Vol. 1: The Making of the Polish-Lithuanian Union, 1385–1569. Oxford University Press. ISBN 978-0-19-820869-3. LCCN 2014948999.
- Safarewicz, J. (1967). Studia językoznawcze. Warszawa.
