= Paprzyca coat of arms =

Polish coat of arms

Paprzyca
- Battle cry: Iwiczna, Kuszaba, Paprzyca, Ruchaba
- Alternative names: Kuczaba, Kuczawa, Kuszaba, Kussaba
- Earliest mention: 14th century
- Towns: none
- Families: 78 names altogether: Baran, Bielicki, Bielicki, Bokum, Bokun, Boksza, Chrebra, Ciechliński, Ciecholewski, Czokołda, Dąbrowski, Dobrowski, Fabirowski, Ganiewski, Ganowski, Garowski, Gowin, Grochowski, Grochowski, Grodziński, Grodziński, Grotowski, Iwicki, Jarzyczewski, Książyk, Kussowski, Kuszaba, Lubowiecki, Lubowiedzki, Łochowski, Miedwiediew, Monstold, Monsztołd, Nieprzecki, Nieprzeski, Niewiński, Niwiński, Ociesalski, Ocosalski, Oczesalski, Oczosalski, Owen, Pabierowski, Pabirowski, Paparzyński, Paprzyc, Paprzyca, Paprzycki, Petrykowski, Pieczewski, Pluta, Potrykowski, Przesmycki, Prześmiński, Rybarski, Sieklucki, Sieprawski, Staszewicz, Strusieński, Swirzawski, Szczeniowski, Śnieżawski, Świcki, Świeżawski, Świżawski, Uchacki, Uhacki, Warszewicki, Warszowicki, Widłowski, Wygonowski, Zberkmuł, Zbierzynek, Zgliczyński, Zgliński, Zrzobek, Zubek, Źróbek, Żupek

Paprzyca is a Polish coat of arms. It was used by several szlachta families in the times of the Polish–Lithuanian Commonwealth.

== History ==
Herb Paprzyca (Bychawa, Kuczawa, Ruchaba, Ruczaba, Paprzyca, Rakwicz) – coat of arms, with the clan's battle cry of Iwiczna and Kuszaba.

=== Origin legend ===
"From the Czech, this coat of arms was to be brought to Poland by Bolesław the Chaste, and this is how it was to be acquired: "A lady was told that a maid had bore three sons, and she not only had her suspected of adultery on this occasion (understanding that with one husband so many children can not be) but also punished her severely. It came about thanks to the Divine cause, who defends the innocent, that the same lady gave birth to nine sons quickly. Whether then, whether ashamed or afraid of some lousy disagreement with her husband, she ordered a serving woman to have eight sons in a near river drowned, one of them only left to raise. At that time, her husband was not at home, but for the preparation of God, he came when the serving woman was carrying the children to their sad fate. He asked her: what are you carrying? She answered - I am carrying pups to drown. The husband looked inside out of curiosity if there was no one fit for game hunting; then he saw the children and learned everything. Secretly he ordered the miller to raise the sons. When they grew up, he guests and neighbours to a feast, and after feeding them he asked them as to what that a mother deserved who would kill her children, All judged her death worthy; Only then the father says: let my puppies stand here: they bring eight boys, all in the same coloring, vividness and complexity, almost all equal height. He explained to all those who have been invited what happened to them and, turning to his wife, he says - for this sin, you worthy of punishment much more significant, only God has kept you from sin through me; for this, thank him for his holy providence. Is it then for the sons in remembrance of this revolution or the miller who raised them as a reward, the shape of the coat of arms was chosen, the authors disagree."

— Niesiecki, Kasper; Bobrowicz, Jan Nepomucew (1839). Herbarz polski. Powikszony dodatkami z poniejszych autorów rkopismów, dowodów, urzdowych i wydany przez Jana Nep. Bobrowicza. Breitkopf i Haertel in Lipsk. Robarts - University of Toronto, pp. 248-249

== Blazon ==
Description of the coat of arms

In the silver field, a black millstone with a middle silver rynd. In the jewel, eight silver puppies heads in two rows; two at the top looking right, two left, one at the bottom looking right, and three turned left. The description of the coat of arms Kuszaba appears already in Jewels of Jan Długosz: as Kuszaba. "Cuius insignia lapis molaris griseus cum ferrea paprzicza in or campo." What in Translation means: Kuszaba. Which sign a millstone grey with iron debris in a white field. According to Niesiecki (...), there should be a millstone upright, grey in color, with a cast iron in the middle, as in the field, in the field with white, on the helmet with eight puppies. Szymański claims that "(...) in a silver field, a millstone (black) with silver papy". By the act of the Harold Union, the coat of arms was transferred to Lithuania (the Lithuanian boyar Manstold adopted the boyar, he adopted Marmicz from Iwiczny Iwicki, the Łęczyca bailiff).

Earliest references

Coat of arms from the Piast dynasty. Year of creation 1249-1296 (XIII century).

== Notable bearers ==
Notable bearers of this coat of arms include:

Dąbrowski, Grodziński, Iwicki, Jarzyczewski, Książyk, Kussowski, Lubowiecki, Niewiński, Niwiński, Śnieżawski, Warszewicki, Zgliński

== See also ==
- Polish heraldry
- Heraldry
- Coat of arms
- Kusza Coat of Arms
