= Mykolas Kęsgaila =

Lithuanian nobleman (died c. 1450)

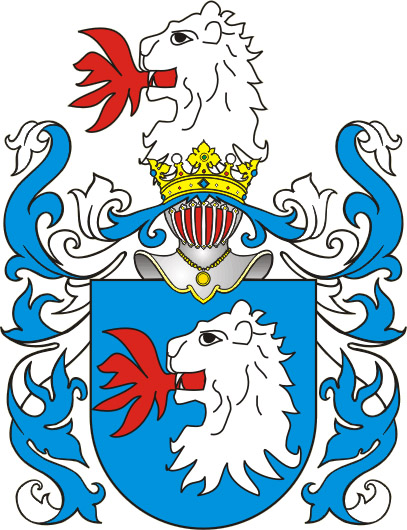
Zadora coat of arms

Mykolas Kęsgaila Valimantaitis (Note: Mykolas (Michael) is his Christian given name, Kęsgaila is his pagan given name, and Valimantaitis is his patronymic used as last name. His sons used Kęsgaila as their last name.) (died c. 1450) was a Lithuanian nobleman from Deltuva. He established the Kęsgaila family in Samogitia, where their power rivalled that of the Grand Duke of Lithuania. Mykolas Kęsgaila was the deputy of Ukmergė (1409–1412), Elder of Samogitia (1412–32, 1440–41, and 1443–50), and castellan of Vilnius (1443–1448). He was a father of Jonas Kęsgaila and Mykolas Kęsgaila the Younger.

Mykolas, son of Valimantas, was first mentioned in the Pact of Vilnius and Radom of 1401. He was a strong supporter of Grand Duke Vytautas the Great, who awarded the loyal ally with the seat of Elder of Samogitia as Mykolas' mother was of Samogitian descent. Mykolas presided over Christianization of Samogitia in 1413, subdued a peasant rebellion in 1418, and foiled a plot by nobles against Vytautas in 1419.

In 1430, after the death of Vytautas, Mykolas Kęsgaila and his brothers Rumbaudas and Jaunius Valimantaitis supported the accession of Švitrigaila to the Lithuanian throne. He signed the Treaty of Skirsnemunė of 1431 – the alliance of Švitrigaila with the Teutonic Order during the Lithuanian Civil War (1432–1438). After Sigismund Kęstutaitis seized power, Mykolas and his brothers were imprisoned. Rumbaudas and Jaunius were executed, while Mykolas managed to restore his power and domains. Possibly, such an outcome was influenced by Mykolas' daughter, the wife of Sigismund's influential ally Jonas Goštautas. Mykolas witnessed the Union of Grodno of 1432 between Sigismund and Jagiełło, King of Poland.

According to the Bychowiec Chronicle, after the murder of Sigismund in 1440, Mykolas was among supporters of Casimir IV Jagiellon for the throne of Grand Duke. For such support, he was reinstated as Elder of Samogitia, but the Samogitians did not want to recognize Casimir's authority. As a compromise, Casimir granted a privilege affirming the semi-autonomic status of the region and granting new freedoms to the nobles. Mykolas was able to return to the office.
