= Mykolas Kęsgaila (died 1476) =

Lithuanian noble, Grand Chancellor of Lithuania, Voivode of Vilnius

Mykolas Kęsgaila (Polish: Michał Kieżgajło z Dziewałtowa; died 1476) was an influential Lithuanian nobleman from the Kęsgailos family. Together with his brother Jonas Kęsgaila, Mykolas dominated the politics of the Grand Duchy of Lithuania for three decades. Mykolas Kęsgaila was Chancellor of Lithuania (1444–1476), regent of Smolensk (1450–1458) and Voivode of Vilnius (1459–1476).
