= Kusza coat of arms =

Polish coat of arms

Kusza
- Battle cry: Ne Cede Arduis
- Alternative name: Niezapominajka
- Families: Bajrasz,, Bystrycki, Bystrzycki, Czyczuda Korejwa, Koreywa, Leszczynowicz, Kosicki, Kuszcz, Kuszczyński, Maszkiewicz, Maślakiewicz, Oławski, Otawski Zubrzycki

Kusza (Polish pronunciation: [ˈku.ʂa]) is a Polish coat of arms.

== Blazon ==
On a red field, a silver crossbow, without the arrow, and pointing downwards.

== Variations ==
There are three variations of this coat of arms:

- Kusza II: On a red field, a silver crossbow, without the arrow, pointing upwards.
- Kusza III: On a red field, a silver crossbow, with a cyphered arrow, pointing upwards, and beneath the charge three silver chevrons (battons).
- Kusza IV: On a red field, a silver crossbow (with an arrow), pointing downwards, sometimes upwards.

== See also ==
- Kuszaba coat of arms
- Polish heraldry
- List of coats of arms of Polish nobility
