= Jonas Kęsgaila =

Lithuanian noble (died 1485)

Jonas Kęsgaila or Kęsgailaitis (Polish: Jan Kieżgajło, Latin: Johannes Kyensgalowicz, died 1485) was a Lithuanian nobleman, son of Mykolas Kęsgaila of the Kęsgaila family He fathered two sons (Stanislovas Kęsgaila and Mykolas Kęsgaila) and two daughters.

Jonas Kęsgaila was Elder of Samogitia (1449–1485), castellan of Trakai (1477) and Vilnius (1478–1485). Jonas was a powerful magnate in Samogitia and even conducted independent foreign policy with the Teutonic Knights. During the Thirteen Years' War (1454–1466), the Samogitians attacked the Knights, including their stronghold in Klaipėda (Memel) in 1455. The Samogitian border was closed, disrupting communication between the Teutonic Knights in Prussia and its branch in Livonia. These actions are usually interpreted as direct support to Casimir IV Jagiellon, King of Poland. However, this might be oversimplification as the attacks were possibly carried out by unruly Samogitians looking for loot, closing of the border was not considered an act of war, and Lithuanian nobles generally did not support the war.

== Sources ==
- Petrauskas, Rimvydas (2003). Lietuvos diduomenė XIV a. pabaigoje – XV a. (in Lithuanian). Aidai. ISBN 9955-445-67-X.
- Petrauskas, Rimvydas; Kiaupienė, Jūratė (2009). Lietuvos istorija. Nauji horizontai: dinastija, visuomenė, valstybė (in Lithuanian). Vol. IV. Baltos lankos. ISBN 978-9955-23-239-1.
