= Zbigniew of Brzezie =

Polish knight of Clan Zadora

Crown Grand Marshal
- In office 1399–1425

starost of Kraków
- In office 1409–1410

Personal details
- Born: ca. 1360
- Died: ca. 1425

Zbigniew of Brzezie (or Zbigniew Lanckoroński) (ca. 1360 – ca. 1425) was a notable Polish knight and nobleman of Clan Zadora.

Zbigniew served as Crown Grand Marshal from 1399 to 1425 and starost of Kraków from 1409 to 1410. He was a diplomat and a close co-worker of King Władysław II Jagiełło. He was several times an envoy to King of Hungary and Germany Sigismund of Luxembourg. During the Battle of Grunwald in 1410 he commanded the banner of the Crown Grand Marshal.
