= Deltuva =

- Town
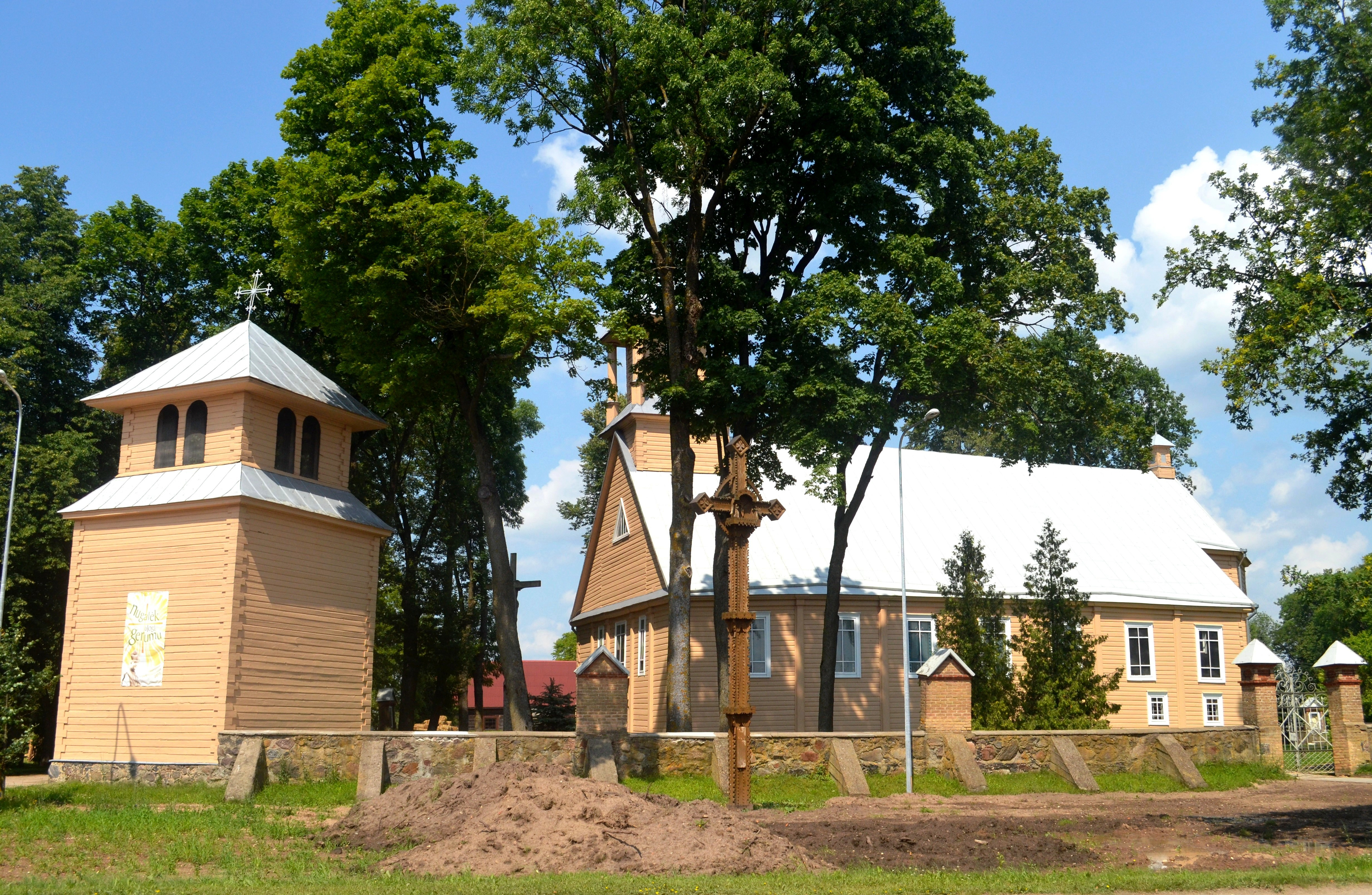
- Church of Deltuva

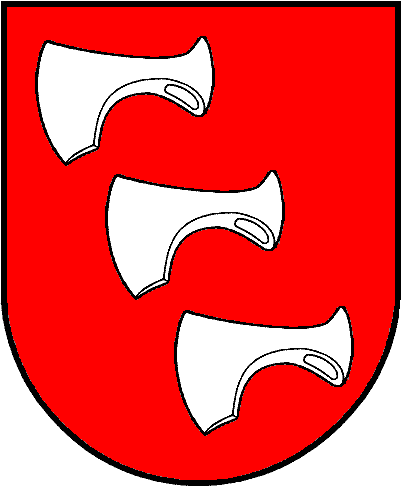
- Coat of arms

- Location of Deltuva
- Coordinates: 55°14′20.4″N 24°40′8.4″E
- Country: Lithuania
- County: Vilnius County

Population (2011)
  - Total: 513
- Time zone: UTC+2 (EET)
  - Summer (DST): UTC+3 (EEST)

Deltuva is a small town in Ukmergė district, Vilnius County, Lithuania. It is located 6 km northwest of Ukmergė, near the road to Kėdainiai. It has about 500 inhabitants.

== Etymology ==
The etymology of the place name Deltuva remains uncertain, making it one of the most enigmatic in the Lithuanian language. Historical sources present conflicting information regarding the naming of the town of Deltuva. While it has been known in its current form since the 16th century, earlier references suggest that the root may have included the obsolete suffix "-velt-" (as seen in one of the spelling variants Dewilto[w]). Some Lithuanian linguists propose that the earliest form of the place name Deltuva was "Dėviltava", which they derive from the reconstructed personal name "Dėviltas". Conversely, there are several known toponymic analogies, as well as the fact that until the early 20th century, a person who lived in Deltuva was referred to as "deltuvis". The name Deltuva is of an ethnonymic origin when compared to the cluster ethnonyms (tribal names) of a similar structure and the regional names Lietuva, Dainava, and Karšuva, which are derived from them. Additionally, the Lithuanian surname Deltuva, Deltuvas, which is common in southern Lithuania (mainly in Sudovia), may also have originated from the ethnonym Deltuva.

Previously in other languages, Deltuva was referred to as: Konstantinovo; Develtov in Yiddish; and Dziewałtów in Polish.

== History ==
Deltuva is first mentioned in historical sources from 1219 in Lithuania's treaty with Halych-Volhynia. Most historians associate the present-day Deltuva with the Land of Deltuva, which is mentioned several times in the Galician–Volhynian Chronicle. In the 12–13th centuries, Deltuva was likely the capital of an ancient Lithuanian land (or Duchy) of Deltuva, which was composed of the modern lands of Deltuva, Ukmergė, Kavarskas, Anykščiai, Kurkliai, Utena, Molėtai, Dubingiai, Giedraičiai, Videniškės, Balninkai and Šešuoliai. The ancient burial ground of Deltuva has been preserved from that time.

In 1264, the Grand Duke of Lithuania Vaišvilkas, taking revenge on the murderers of his father, King of Lithuania Mindaugas, forcibly took the castle of Deltuva, and the Land of Deltuva was incorporated into the Grand Duke's lands. In 1385, the descriptions of the crusaders' war routes to Lithuania mention the Land of Deltuva (Land Dewilto[w]), the capital of which must have been the present-day town of Deltuva. In 1434 the manor of Deltuva is mentioned as belonging to the Grand Duke of Lithuania. In the 15th century, the owners of the town and manor of Deltuva were the Valimantaičiai family, later – to their successors Kęsgailos and from the 16th century – to the Radziwiłł (Radvila) family.

In 1444 Mykolas Kęsgaila Valimantaitis built a Catholic church in the town, and before 1570 the Radvila family built an Evangelical Reformed church with a parish school, mentioned again in 1629 and 1650. Deltuva is marked on the map of the Grand Duchy of Lithuania of 1613. From 1681 Deltuva belonged to Marcjan Aleksander Ogiński. In 1744 Deltuva received the privilege of a market town. In 1752 the Church of Holy Trinity was built.

At the end of the 18th and in the middle of the 19th century there was a Catholic parish school with 11 pupils in 1777 and 29 pupils in 1863. The Battle of Deltuva (also known as the Battle of Ukmergė) occurred on 28 June 1812, at the outset of the French invasion of Russia. It involved the 1st Army Corps of the Imperial Russian Army, which was in retreat, and the Grande Armée, which was advancing towards Moscow.

In the 19th century, the Tyszkiewicz (Tiškevičius) family were the owners of Deltuva. In 1865 a Tsarist primary school was established. In 1867 Deltuva was renamed to "Konstantinovo" after Konstantin Petrovich von Kaufman, tsarist official and Governor of Vilna. The original name "Deltuva" was returned to the town in 1914.

In 1905, the residents of the Deltuva forcibly removed the tsarist administration from the town. At the outset of 1919, the Red Army occupied Deltuva. In response, the infantrymen and horsemen of the Lithuanian Armed Forces, who were engaged in combat with the Russians, brought artillery cannons to bear against them. On 28 March 1919, the first shot was fired from a cannon at the Deltuva clergy house, which was the Red Army's operational base at the time. In 2013, a commemorative plaque was unveiled on the old clergy house building, marking the centenary of the first artillery shell fired by the Lithuanian army in 1919.

During the World War II, Deltuva was subjected to extensive bombing by Soviet Russian and Nazi German forces. Following the end of the war and Soviet re-occupation of Lithuania, the region saw active resistance from Lithuanian partisans of the Vytis military district.

On 2 November 2009, the President of Lithuania adopted the coat of arms of Deltuva by decree.
