= Duchy of Samogitia =

Administrative unit of Lithuania (1219–1795)

Coordinates: 55°45′N 21°50′E

Duchy of Samogitia Žemaitėjės seniūnėjė Žemaičių seniūnija Księstwo żmudzkie
- Duchy of the Grand Duchy of Lithuania
- 1219–1795
- Flag Coat of arms

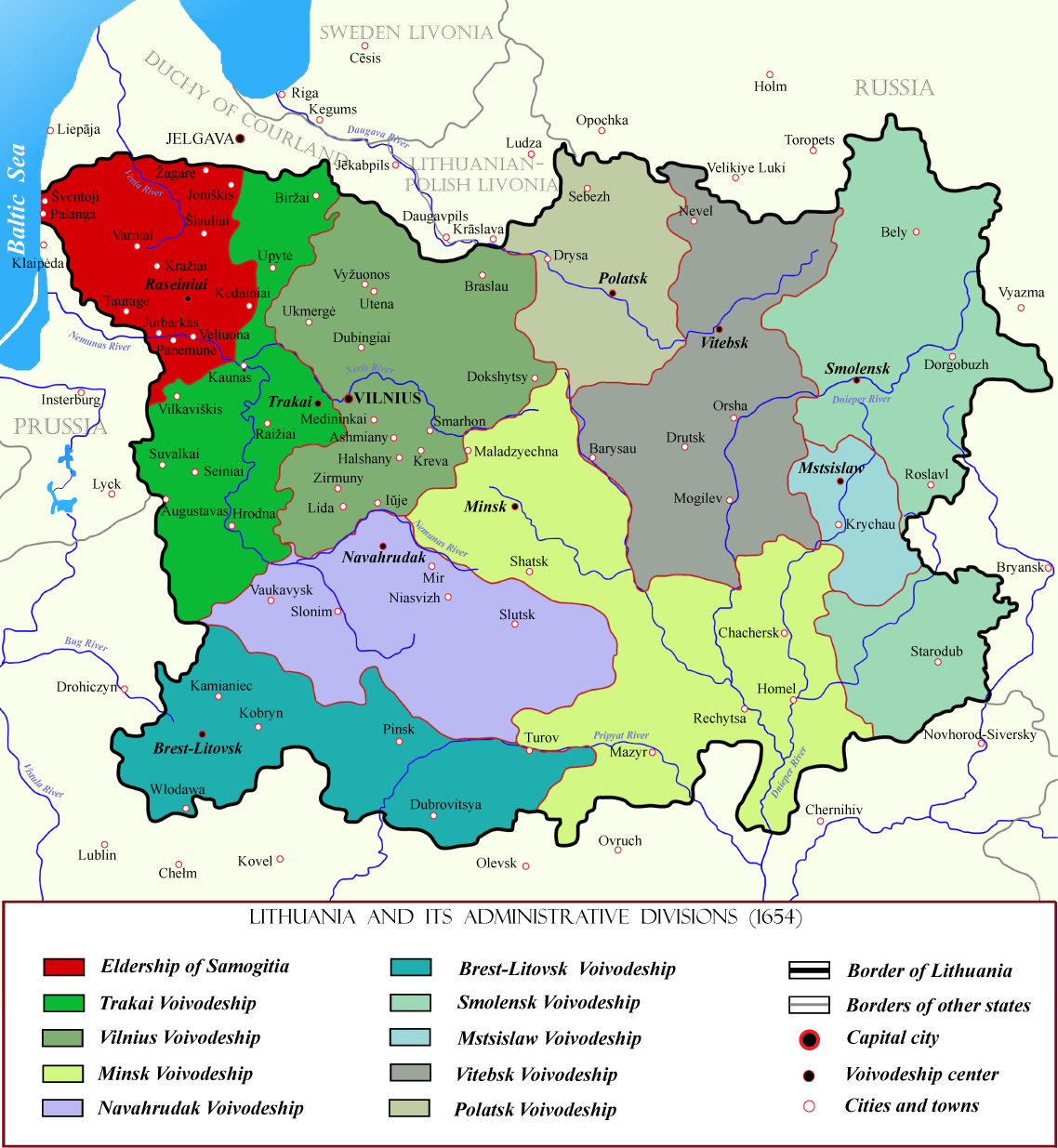
- Duchy of Samogitia in red. Its borders did not change after the Union of Lublin.
- Capital: Raseiniai
- Area
- 23,300 km^{2} (9,000 sq mi)
- History
  - Established: 1219
  - Third partition of the Polish–Lithuanian Commonwealth: 1795
- Political subdivisions: 28 tracts
Preceded by	Succeeded by
Samogitia	Russian Empire

The Duchy of Samogitia (Lithuanian: Žemaičių seniūnija, Samogitian: Žemaitėjės seniūnėjė, Polish: Księstwo żmudzkie) was an administrative unit of the Grand Duchy of Lithuania from 1422 (and from 1569, a member country of the Polish–Lithuanian Commonwealth). Between 1422 and 1441 it was known as the Starostwo of Samogitia. Since the 1540s the Grand Duke of Lithuania also held the title of Duke of Samogitia, although the actual ruler of the province, responsible to the Grand Duke, was known as the General Starosta of Samogitia who was self-elected by the Samogitian nobility.

The Duchy was located in the western part of the present Republic of Lithuania. Historically, in the west it had access to the Baltic Sea; in the north, it bordered the Duchy of Courland and Ducal Prussia in the south. During the Middle Ages and until the last partition in 1795, Samogitia had clearly defined borders as the Duchy of Samogitia. Afterwards the area encompassed the Samogitian Diocese. Today Samogitia is one of several ethnographic regions and is not defined administratively.

== Name ==
Samogitia is a Latinized version of the name Žemaitija, meaning "the Lowlands" as opposed to Aukštaitija for "the Highlands". In the Middle Ages, the names Samaiten, Samaitae, Zamaytae, Samogitia, Samattae, Samethi were used in German and Latin sources. They, together with other variants Schmudien, Schamaiten (German) and Żmudź (Polish), are all derived from the Lithuanian Žemaičiai, dial. Žemaitiai / Žemaitei.

== Geography ==
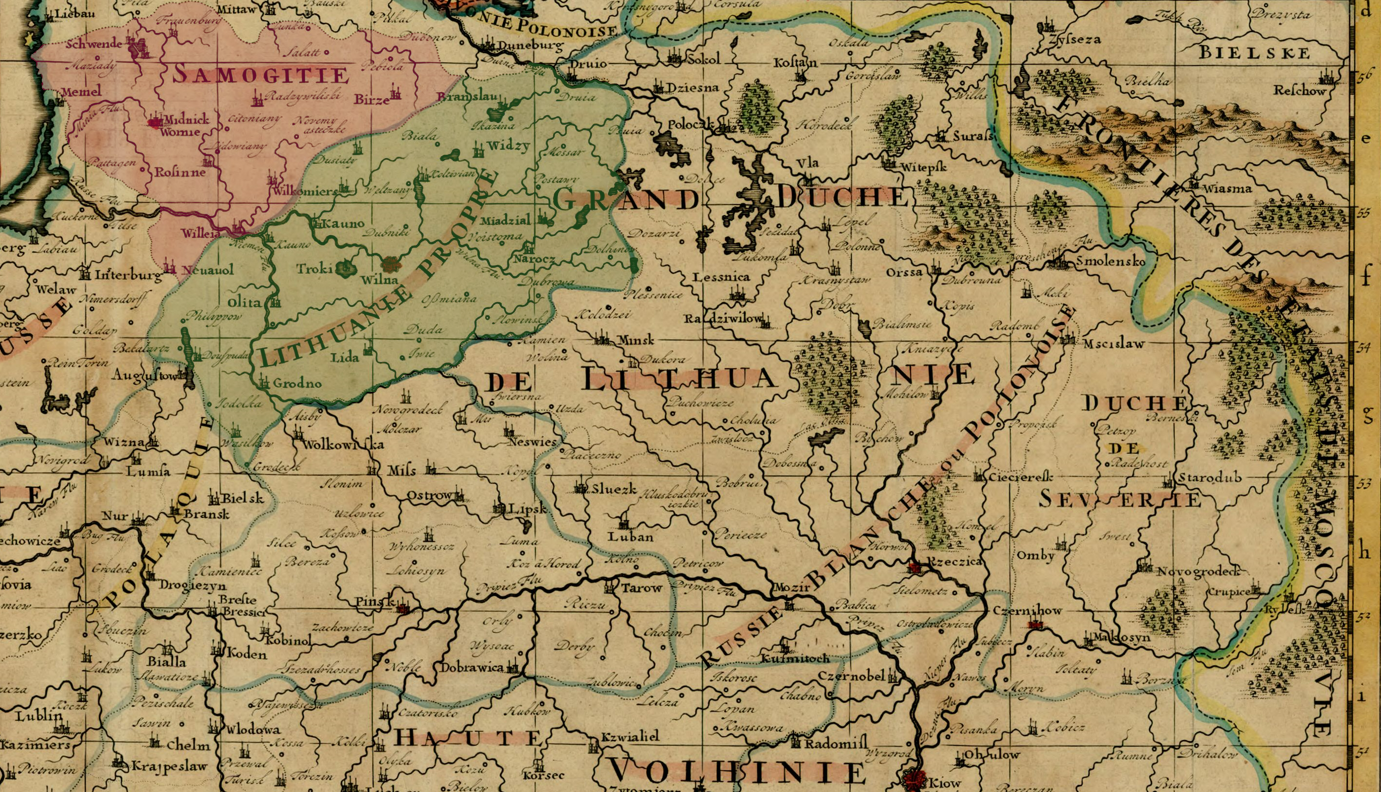
Samogitia and Lithuania proper in a 1712 map by Henri Chatelain

The Duchy was located in what today is several counties (apskritis) in Lithuania: a small part of Kaunas County (Kauno Apskritis), the western part Šiauliai County (Šiaulių Apskritis), Tauragė County (Tauragės Apskritis), Telšiai County (Telšių Apskritis), the northern part of Klaipėda County (Klaipėdos Apskritis) and the northern part of Marijampolė County (Marijampolės Apskritis).

The major part of Samogitia is located on Western Upland. Lowlands which are referred in its name are on the border between Samogitia and Eastern Lithuania, along the Nevėžis River.

The Duchy of Samogitia had the size of approximately 25,700 square kilometers.

== History ==
Duchy in the Polish–Lithuanian Commonwealth (1569-1795)

The attacking Bear, the historical Coat of Arms of Samogitia

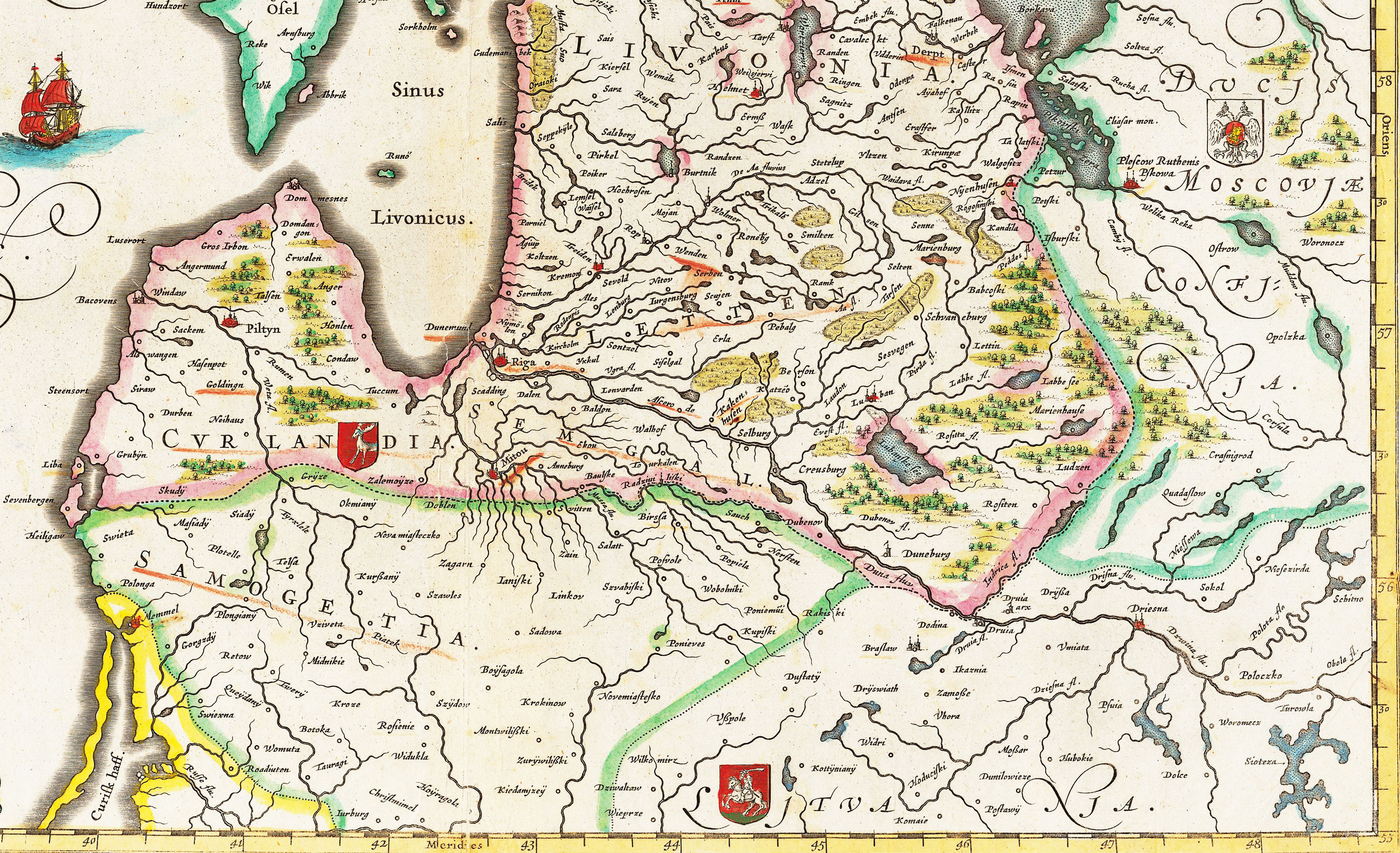
Samogitia in the 17th century

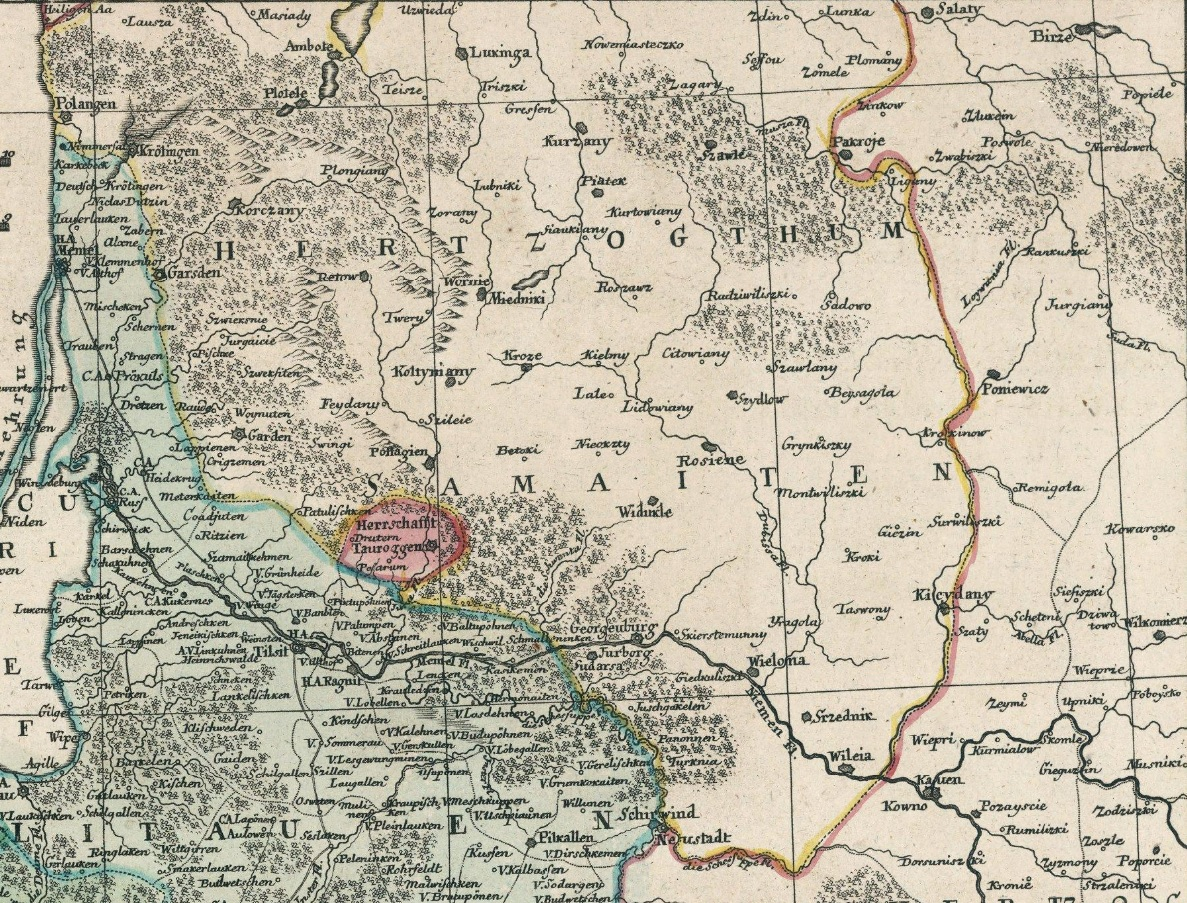
Map of Samogitia in 1753

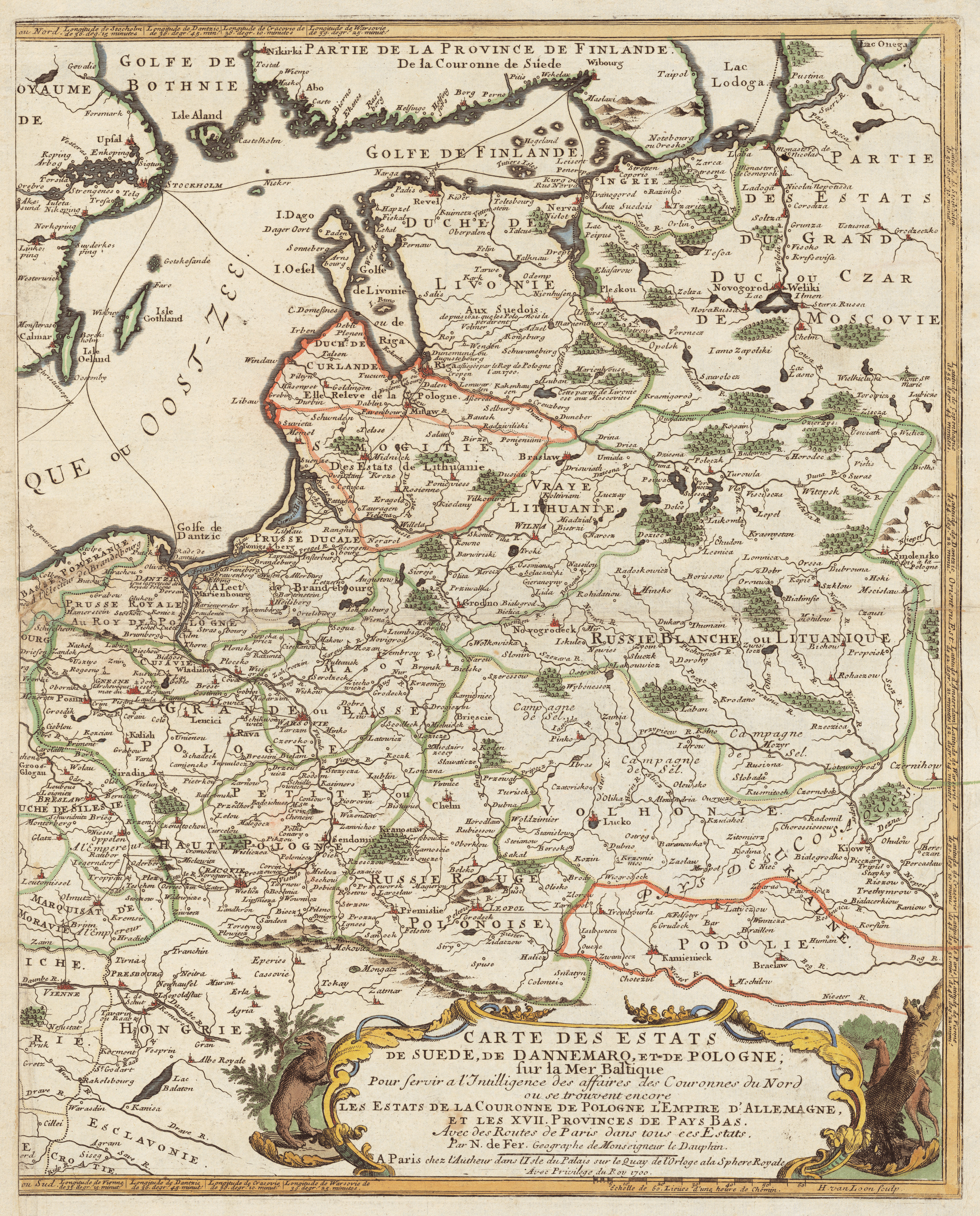
French map of the 18th century Polish–Lithuanian Commonwealth with Duchy of Samogitia (Samogitie) and Lithuania proper (Vraye Lithuanie) separated with red and green lines

Before the formation of the Lithuanian state, Samogitia was ruled by its local noblemen. A chronicle mentions two dukes from Samogitia in 1219 as signatories of a treaty with Volhynia.

Since the formation of the Grand Duchy of Lithuania in the 13th century, Samogitia was its dependent territory, however sometimes the influence of the Lithuanian Grand Duke was very limited. During the rule of the first Lithuanian king, Mindaugas, Samogitians pursued an independent foreign policy and continued fighting with the Knights of the Sword even after King Mindaugas had signed a peace treaty with them.

Samogitia for 200 years played a crucial role in halting the expansion of the Teutonic Order and defeated the Knights of the Sword in the Battle of Saule (1236) and the Livonian Order in the Battle of Skuodas (1259), and the Battle of Durbe (1260).

In the atmosphere of fierce battles with the Teutonic Knights, the Lithuanian rulers Jogaila and Vytautas several times ceded Samogitia to the Teutonic Order in 1382, 1398 and 1404. However, the Teutonic Knights were not successful in subjugating the land, and Samogitians revolted in 1401 and 1409. After the defeats in the Battle of Grunwald (1410) and following wars, in 1422 the Teutonic Order ceded Samogitia to the Grand Duchy of Lithuania under the Treaty of Melno.

Samogitians were the last in Lithuania to accept Christianity in 1413. During the Christianization of Samogitia, none of the clergy, who came to Samogitia with Jogaila, were able to communicate with the natives, therefore Jogaila himself taught the Samogitians about the Catholicism, thus he was able to communicate in the Samogitian dialect of the Lithuanian language.

The Grand Duke of Lithuania Casimir Jagiellon acknowledged the autonomy of Samogitia in the Grand Duchy of Lithuania and then issued a privilege to the Starostwo of Samogitia to elects its own starosta in 1441.

Because of its prolonged wars with the Teutonic Order, Samogitia had developed a social and political structure different from the rest of Lithuania. It had a larger proportion of free farmers and smaller estates than in Eastern Lithuania.

As with most of the Polish–Lithuanian Commonwealth, Samogitia suffered in the aftermath of the Swedish invasion of Commonwealth (the Deluge, mid-17th century). Its population dropped from close to 400,000 to about 250,000; only to return to 400,000 by the late 18th century.

After the annexation of Lithuania by Imperial Russia, Samogitia was included in the Vilna Governorate (the southern extreme was detached for New East Prussia and so on); in 1843 it was transferred to a newly established Kovno Governorate. In the early 19th century, Samogitia was the centre of the Lithuanian National Revival, which stressed the importance of the Lithuanian language and opposed Russification and Polonization.

== Starostas of Samogitia ==
The General Starostas of Samogitia (equivalents of voivodes) included:

No.	Portrait or Coat of Arms	Starosta of Samogitia	Took office	Left office	Time in office
1	Rumbaudas Valimantaitis	Rumbaudas Valimantaitis (?–1432)	1409	1411	2 years, 0 days
2	Mykolas Kęsgaila	Mykolas Kęsgaila (?–c. 1450)	1412	1432	20 years, 0 days
3	Jurgis Galminas [lt]	Jurgis Galminas (1409–1438)	1432	1434	2 years, 0 days
4	Mykolas Kantautas	Mykolas Kantautas (born ?)	1435	1440	5 years, 0 days
5	Mykolas Kęsgaila	Mykolas Kęsgaila (?–c. 1450)	1440	1441	1 year, 0 days
6	Petras Gedgaudas	Petras Gedgaudas (born ?)	1441	1443	2 years, 0 days
7	Mykolas Kęsgaila	Mykolas Kęsgaila (?–c. 1450)	1443	1450	7 years, 0 days
8	Jonas Kęsgaila	Jonas Kęsgaila (?–1485)	1451	1485	34 years, 0 days
9	Stanislovas Kęsgaila	Stanislovas Kęsgaila (?–1527)	1486	1526	40 years, 0 days
10	Stanislovas Kęsgaila	Stanislovas Kęsgaila (1503–1532)	1527	1532	5 years, 0 days
11	Petras Kiška (Polish: Piotr Kiszka)	Petras Kiška (Polish: Piotr Kiszka) (?–1534)	1532	1534	2 years, 0 days
12	Jonas Radvila (Polish: Jan Radziwiłł)	Jonas Radvila (Polish: Jan Radziwiłł) (1492–1542)	1535	1542	7 years, 0 days
13	Motiejus Vaitiekaitis Kločka [lt] (Polish: Maciej Janowicz Kłoczko)	Motiejus Vaitiekaitis Kločka (Polish: Maciej Janowicz Kłoczko) (?–1543)	1542	1543	1 year, 0 days
14	Jurgis Bilevičius (Polish: Jerzy Billewicz)	Jurgis Bilevičius (Polish: Jerzy Billewicz) (born ?)	1543	1544	1 year, 0 days
15	Stanislovas Mikolajaitis Kęsgaila [lt] (Polish: Stanisław Kieżgajło)	Stanislovas Mikolajaitis Kęsgaila (Polish: Stanisław Kieżgajło) (1520–1554)	1544	1555	1 year, 0 days
16	Jeronimas Chodkevičius (Polish: Hieronim Chodkiewicz)	Jeronimas Chodkevičius (Polish: Hieronim Chodkiewicz) (c. 1515–1561)	1545	1561	16 years, 0 days
-	Vacant	Vacant; Acting	1561	1563	2 years, 0 days
17	Jonas Chodkevičius (Polish: Jan Hieronimowicz Chodkiewicz)	Jonas Chodkevičius (Polish: Jan Hieronimowicz Chodkiewicz) (1537–1579)	1563	1579	16 years, 0 days
18	Jonas Kiška (Polish: Jan Kiszka)	Jonas Kiška (Polish: Jan Kiszka) (1547–1592)	1579	1592	13 years, 0 days
19	Jurgis Chodkevičius [lt] (Polish: Jerzy Chodkiewicz)	Jurgis Chodkevičius (Polish: Jerzy Chodkiewicz) (1570–1595)	1590	1595	5 years, 0 days
20	Stanislovas Radvila (Polish: Stanisław Radziwiłł)	Stanislovas Radvila (Polish: Stanisław Radziwiłł) (1570–1595)	1595	1599	4 years, 0 days
21	Jonas Karolis Chodkevičius (Polish: Jan Karol Chodkiewicz)	Jonas Karolis Chodkevičius (Polish: Jan Karol Chodkiewicz) (1561–1621)	1599	1616	17 years, 0 days
-	Vacant	Vacant; Acting	1616	1619	3 years, 0 days
22	Jeronimas Valavičius (Polish: Hieronim Wołłowicz)	Jeronimas Valavičius (Polish: Hieronim Wołłowicz) (1573–1636)	1619	1636	17 years, 0 days
-	Vacant	Vacant; Acting	1636	1643	7 years, 0 days
23	Jonas Alfonsas Liackis [lt] (Polish: Jan Alfons Lacki)	Jonas Alfonsas Liackis (Polish: Jan Alfons Lacki) (?–1646)	1643	1646	3 years, 0 days
24	Jonušas Radvila (Polish: Janusz Radziwiłł)	Jonušas Radvila (Polish: Janusz Radziwiłł) (1612–1655)	1646	1653	7 years, 0 days
25	Jurgis Glebavičius [lt] (Polish: Jerzy Hlebowicz)	Jurgis Glebavičius (Polish: Jerzy Hlebowicz) (1605?–1669)	1653	1668	15 years, 0 days
26	Aleksandras Palubinskis [lt] (Polish: Aleksander Połubiński)	Aleksandras Palubinskis (Polish: Aleksander Połubiński) (1626–1679)	1668	1669	1 year, 0 days
27	Viktorinas Mlečka [lt] (Polish: Wiktoryn Mleczko)	Viktorinas Mlečka (Polish: Wiktoryn Mleczko) (?–1679)	1670	1679	9 years, 0 days
-	Vacant	Vacant; Acting	1679	1681	2 years, 0 days
28	Kazimieras Jonas Sapiega (Polish: Kazimierz Jan Sapieha)	Kazimieras Jonas Sapiega (Polish: Kazimierz Jan Sapieha) (1637–1720)	1681	1682	1 year, 0 days
-	Vacant	Vacant; Acting	1682	1684	2 years, 0 days
29	Petras Mykolas Pacas [lt] (Polish: Piotr Pac)	Petras Mykolas Pacas (Polish: Piotr Pac) (1645–1696)	1684	1696	15 years, 0 days
-	Vacant	Vacant; Acting	1696	1698	2 years, 0 days
30	Grigalius Antanas Oginskis (Polish: Grzegorz Antoni Ogiński)	Grigalius Antanas Oginskis (Polish: Grzegorz Antoni Ogiński) (1654–1709)	1698	1709	1 year, 0 days
31	Kazimieras Garbauskis [lt] (Polish: Kazimierz Horbowski)	Kazimieras Garbauskis (Polish: Kazimierz Horbowski) (?–1729)	1710	1729	19 years, 0 days
-	Vacant	Vacant; Acting	1729	1742	13 years, 0 days
32	Juozapas Tiškevičius [lt] (Polish: Józef Tyszkiewicz)	Juozapas Tiškevičius (Polish: Józef Tyszkiewicz) (1694–1754)	1742	1754	12 years, 0 days
-	Vacant	Vacant; Acting	1754	1767	13 years, 0 days
33	Jonas Chodkevičius (Polish: Jan Chodkiewicz)	Jonas Chodkevičius (Polish: Jan Chodkiewicz) (1738–1781)	1767	1781	14 years, 0 days
-	Vacant	Vacant; Acting	1781	1783	2 years, 0 days
34	Antanas Anupras Gelgaudas [lt] (Polish: Antoni Onufry Giełgud)	Antanas Anupras Gelgaudas (Polish: Antoni Onufry Giełgud) (1720–1795)	1783	1795	12 years, 0 days

== See also ==
- Samogitian diocese
- Samogitian language
