= Zadora coat of arms =

Polish coat of arms

Zadora
- Battle cry: Budziszyn, Zadora
- Alternative names: Płomień, Płomienie
- Earliest mention: 1399 (Seal of Zbigniew z Brzezia)
- Towns: none
- Families: 97 names altogether: Alantsy, Andruszkiewicz, Bakiewicz, Bakium, Balcerowski, Balicki, Bartosz, Bartoszewicz, Bartoszewski, Bąk, Bernat, Bicharu, Borchowski, Borski, Brochowski, Brohomir, Chrząstowski, Ciecharzewski, Ciesielski, Cimiński, Ciszewski, Dobczyński, Dołholewski, Dowgiałło, Dowgiało, Gorlicki, Hauntal, Hawnulewicz, Hawrykowicz, Jaśkowski, Jawno, Jawnuta, Kazirod, Karwacjan, Karwaczian, Krok-Paszkowski, Krzeczowski, Krzetowski, Krzętowski, Lanckoroński, Langiert, Lechnicki, Lenc, Lenczewski, Lenczowski, Leniec, Lubomelski, Łączkowic, Łączkowski, Marszałkiewicz, Marszałkowicz, Narbut, Narbutt, Niwicki, Paczkowski, Paskucki, Paskudzki, Paszkowicz, Paszkowski, Paszkudzki, Pigatz, Płuksnia, Płuksnio, Prondzyński, Przecławski, Rosperski, Rospierski, Roszecki, Roszocki, Rozperski, Rusakowski, Rusocki, Russakowski, Russocki, Rwocki, Salame, Samotyja, Siekierzyński, Skwarzyński, Stołtonos, Stryk, Strykowski, Strzyszka, Strzyżewski, Szułdrzyński, Szwejcer, Walter, Włodzisławski, Wodzisławski, Wojeński, Wrzeszcz, Zadora, Zadroski, Zawisza, Zimiński, Zuzelski, Zużelski, Życieński, Życiński, Żyniecki

Zadora (Płomień, Płomienie, Płomieńczyk) is a Polish coat of arms which was used by many szlachta families in the former territories of the Polish-Lithuanian Commonwealth.

== History ==
The earliest mentions of the coat of arms date back to the late 14th century. It was used in the Grand Duchy of Lithuania after the Union of Horodło.

== Blazon ==
Within a blue field is the singular head of a silver lion facing left, with flames issued from its mouth. There is a silver helm, upon which a blue torse sits with blue and white mantling originating from it. Resting on the torse is a golden crown, crested with the similar head of the silver lion, with flames also issuing from its mouth.

== Notable bearers ==
Notable bearers of this Coat of Arms include:

- Lanckoroński family
  - Przedbor z Brzezia
  - Zbigniew z Brzezia
  - Przecław Lanckoroński
  - Stanisław Lanckoroński
  - Mikołaj Lanckoroński z Brzezia
- Mykolas Kęsgaila
- Stanislovas Kęsgaila
- Michał Szweycer
- Wojciech Łączkowski
- Paweł Łączkowski

== Variations ==
Coat of arms of Counts Lanckoroński

== See also ==
- Polish heraldry
- Heraldic family
- Armorial of Polish nobility

== Bibliography ==
- Tadeusz Gajl: Herbarz polski od średniowiecza do XX wieku : ponad 4500 herbów szlacheckich 37 tysięcy nazwisk 55 tysięcy rodów. L&L, 2007, s. 406-539. ISBN 978-83-60597-10-1.
