= Family of Jogaila =

Family of Wladyslaw II Jagiello

This page describes relatives of Jogaila, who was Grand Duke of Lithuania, and, known under the name Wladyslaw II Jagiello, king of Poland. Family relations up to two generations before him, and three generations after him are mentioned.

== Family tree (grandparents to children) ==
Gediminas b. c. 1275 d. 1341		Jewna b. c. 1280 d. 1344	Alexander I of Tver b. 1301 d. 22 X 1339		Anastasia of Halych
	Algirdas b. c. 1296 d. V 1377			Ulianna of Tver b. c. 1330 d. 1392

1 Jadwiga I of Poland b. II? 1374 d. 17 VII 1399; OO 18 II 1386	2 Anna of Cili b. 1380/81 d. 21 I 1416; OO 29 I 1402	Władysław II Jagiełło b. 1351/1363 d. 1 VI 1434	3 Elizabeth of Pilica b. 1370/1380 d. 12 V 1420; OO 2 V 1417	4 Sophia of Halsany b. c. 1405 d. 21 IX 1461; OO 7 II 1422
1	2	4	4	4
Elżbieta Bonifacja b. 22 VI 1399 d. 13 VII 1399	Jadwiga b. 8 IV 1408 d. 8 XII 1431	Władysław III b. 31 X 1424 d. 10 XI 1444	Kazimierz b. 16 V 1426 d. 2 III 1427	Kazimierz IV b. 30 XI 1427 d. 7 VI 1492

=== Brothers ===
Half-brothers:

- Andrei of Polotsk (1325 – 12 August 1399), Duke of Polock (1342–1387), Pskov (1342–1348)
- Demetrius I Starszy (1327 – 12 August 1399 in the Battle of the Vorskla River), Duke of Bryansk (1356–1379 and 1388–1399)
- Constantine (died before 30 October 1390), Prince of Czartorysk. According to J. Tęgowski, he may be son of Koriat.
- Vladimir Olgerdovich (died after October 1398), Prince of Kiev (1362–1394), Kopyl, Sluck. Ancestor of Olelkovich and Belsky families.
- Fiodor (Theodore; died in 1399), Prince of Rylsk (1370–1399), Ratnie (1387–1394), Bryansk (1393)

Brothers:

- Skirgaila (baptized Ivan; c. 1354 – 11 January 1397 in Kiev), Duke of Trakai (1382–1395), Kiev (1395–1397), regent of Lithuania
- Kaributas (baptized Dmitry; c. 1355 – after 1404), Prince of Novhorod-Siverskyi (1386–1392/93)
- Lengvenis (baptised Simon; c. 1356 – after 19 June 1431), Prince of Mstislavl, regent of the Novgorod Republic
- Karigaila (baptized Casimir; c. 1364/1367 – 1390), Prince of Mstislavl
- Minigailo (c. 1365/1368 – by 1382)
- * Vygantas (baptized Alexander; c. 1372 – 28 June 1392), Prince of Kernavė
- Švitrigaila (baptized Bolesław; c. 1373 – 10 February 1452 in Lutsk), Grand Duke of Lithuania (1430–1432), ruler of Volhynia (1437–1452)

=== Sisters ===
Half Sisters:

- Theodora, wife of Sviatoslav Titovich of Karachev
- Agrypina (baptized Mary; died in 1393), wife of Boris of Suzdal

Full Sisters:

- Kenna (baptized Joan; c. 1351 – 27 April 1367), wife of Casimir IV, Duke of Pomerania
- Euphrosyne (c. 1352-1405/1406), wife of Oleg II of Ryazan
- Helen (c. 1357 – 15 September 1437/1438), wife of Vladimir the Bold
- Maria (c. 1363- after 1382), wife of Vaidila and David Dmitrovich of Gorodets
- Alexandra (c. 1368/1370 – 19 June 1434), wife of Siemowit IV, Duke of Masovia
- Wilheida (baptized Catherine; c. 1369/1374 – after 4 April 1422), wife of John II, Duke of Mecklenburg-Stargard
- Jadwiga (c. 1375 – after 1407), wife of Jan III of Oświęcim

=== Sons ===
- King Wladislaus III of Poland (1424 - 1444)
- Casimir (1426 - 1427)
- King Casimir IV of Poland (1427 - 1492)

=== Daughters ===
- Elżbieta Bonifacja (1399 - 1399)
- Jadwiga Jagiellon (1408 - 1431)

== Genealogical tree (rulers of the Jagiellon dynasty) ==
The Jagiellon dynasty started with Jogaila and had four generations of rulers, who ruled in several European countries:

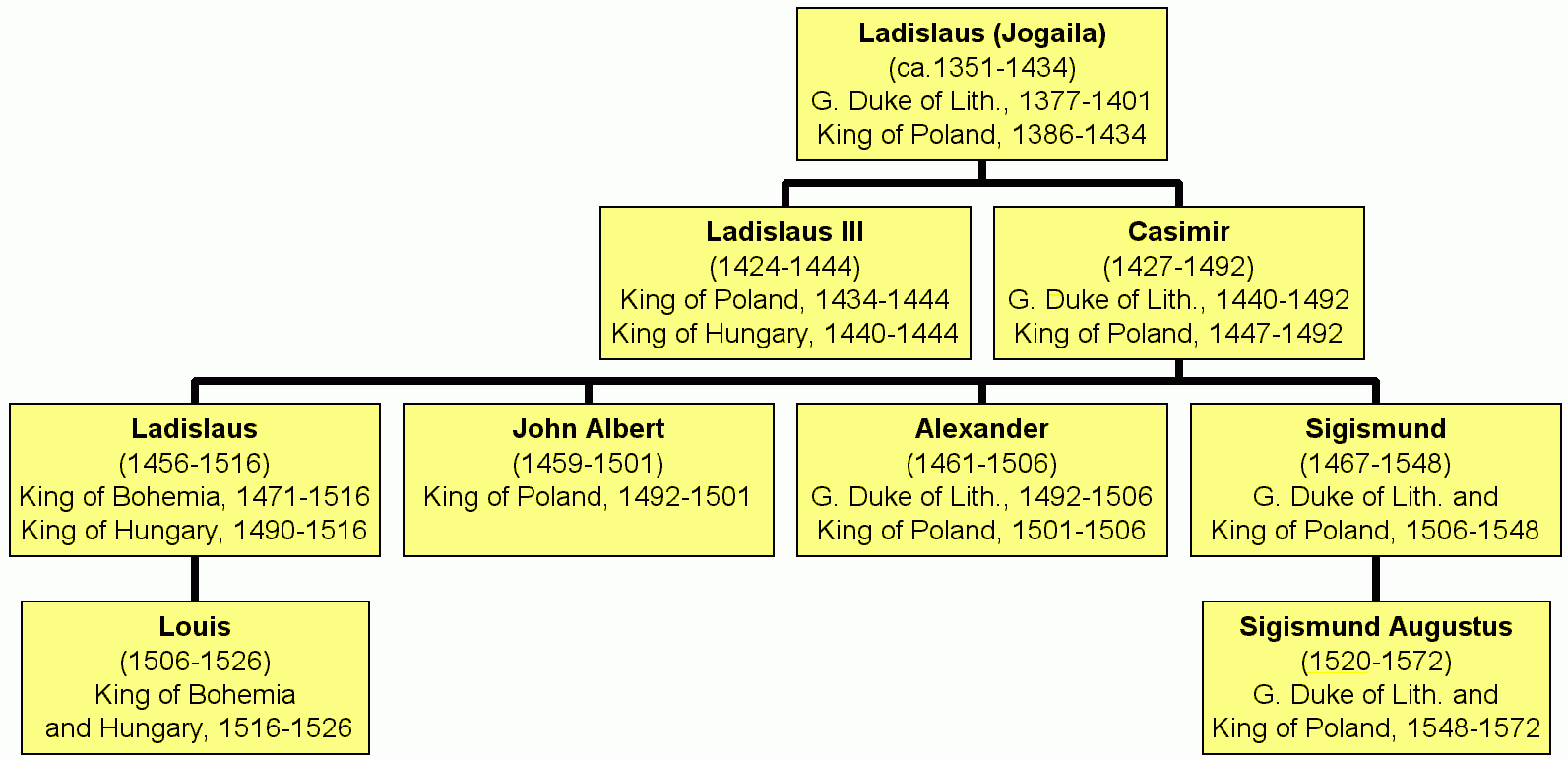
