= Battle of the Vikhra River =

1386 battle between the Grand Duchy of Lithuania and the Principality of Smolensk

- Miniature from the Illustrated Chronicle of Ivan the Terrible (16th century)
Date	29 April 1386
Location	Vikhra River, near Mstislavl 54°01′42″N 31°44′13″E
Result	Lithuanian victory

Belligerents
Grand Duchy of Lithuania	Principality of Smolensk

Commanders and leaders
Skirgaila	Sviatoslav II †

The Battle of the Vikhra River (Note: Lithuanian: Vichros mūšis or Vechros upės mūšis; Russian: Битва на реке Вихре; Belarusian: Мсціслаўская бітва.) took place on 29 April 1386 on the Vikhra River, a tributary of the Sozh, near Mstislavl, between the Grand Duchy of Lithuania and the Principality of Smolensk. The Lithuanians achieved a decisive victory and Smolensk was forced to accept being a vassal of Lithuania.

== Background ==
Andrei of Polotsk fought with his younger half-brother Jogaila for the throne of the Grand Duchy of Lithuania. Andrei allied with the Livonian Order and Prince Sviatoslav II of Smolensk, who wanted to reconquer the Principality of Mstislavl. In February 1386, when Jogaila and his allies celebrated his wedding to Jadwiga of Poland and coronation as Polish king in Kraków, the Order invaded Lithuania, almost reaching Vilnius. In March, the army of Smolensk besieged Vitebsk and Orsha, but could not take them. Sviatoslav devastated many lands on the Lithuanian border and besieged Mstislavl, which was defended by Karigaila, son of Algirdas.

Meeting between opposing soldiers after the battle

== Battle ==
Upon hearing the news of the invasion, Jogaila sent a great army under the command of his brother Skirgaila. The army also included Kaributas, Lengvenis, and Vytautas. Mstislavl withstood ten days of siege before the Lithuanian army reached it and engaged the Smolensk army. The result of the battle was a complete defeat of the Smolensk troops and the deaths of Sviatoslav and his nephew Ivan. Two of Sviatoslav's sons, Gleb and Yury, were seriously wounded and taken prisoners. Skirgaila's army approached Smolensk, but did not lay siege. Yury, who according to the Bychowiec Chronicle was married to a niece of Skirgaila and Jogaila, was installed as the prince of Smolensk and as a vassal to Lithuania. Gleb Sviatoslavich was taken as a hostage to Lithuania.

== Aftermath ==
Eventually, Gleb returned to Smolensk and challenged Yury for the throne. This provided Grand Duke Vytautas with an opportunity to seize Smolensk in 1395.
