= Lithuanian Civil War (1389–1392) =

Part of Vytautas–Jogaila power struggle

- Part of the Vytautas–Jogaila power struggle
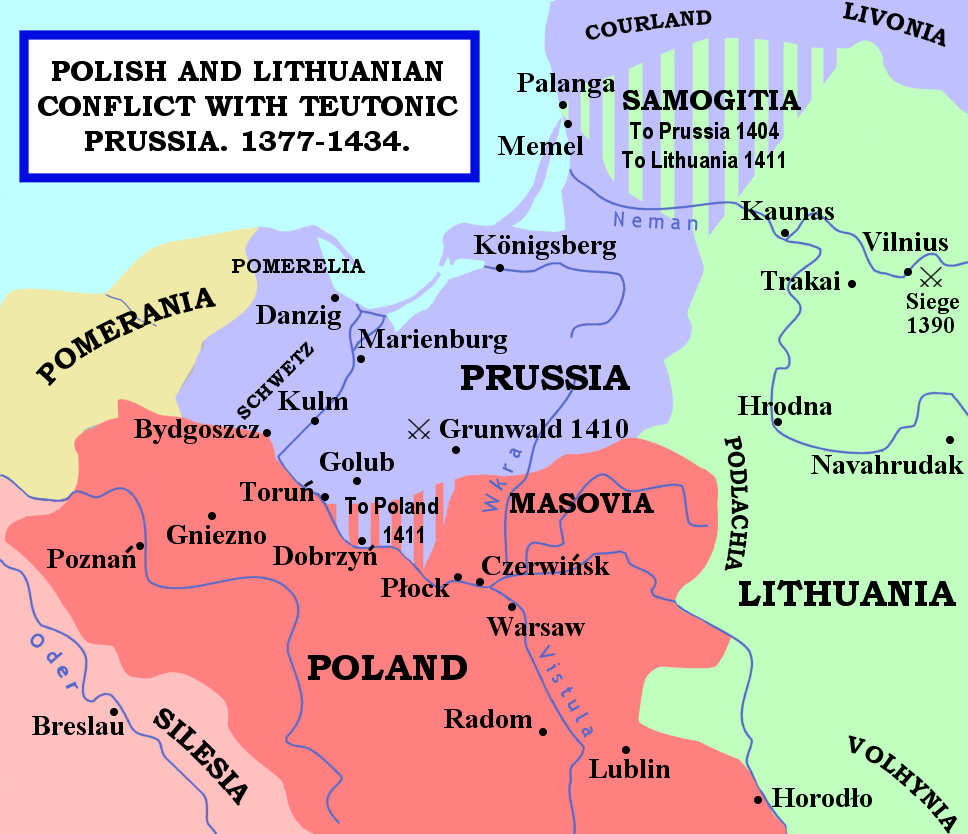
- Map of the Teutonic Knight conflict with Lithuania and Poland
Date	1389–1392
Location	Prussia; Grand Duchy of Lithuania
Result	Ostrów Agreement; Vytautas made Jogaila's regent in Grand Duchy of Lithuania

Belligerents
Teutonic Knights; Samogitia	Grand Duchy of Lithuania; Kingdom of Poland

Commanders and leaders
Vytautas; Conrad Zöllner von Rothenstein; Konrad von Wallenrode	Wladyslaw Jogaila; Skirgaila

The Lithuanian Civil War of 1389–1392 was the second civil conflict between Jogaila, King of Poland and Grand Duke of Lithuania, and his cousin Vytautas. At issue was control of the Grand Duchy of Lithuania, then the largest state in Europe. Jogaila had been crowned King of Poland in 1386; he installed his brother Skirgaila as ruler of Lithuania. Skirgaila proved unpopular and Vytautas attempted to depose him. When his first attempt to take the capital city of Vilnius failed, Vytautas forged an alliance with the Teutonic Knights, their common enemy – just as both cousins had done during the Lithuanian Civil War between 1381 and 1384. Vytautas and the Knights unsuccessfully besieged Vilnius in 1390. Over the next two years it became clear that neither side could achieve a quick victory, and Jogaila proposed a compromise: Vytautas would become his deputy with de facto power of the Grand Duke. This proposal was formalized in the Ostrów Agreement of 1392, and Vytautas turned against the Knights. He went on to rule over Lithuania for 38 years (eventually becoming the Grand Duke as Jogaila's co-ruler in 1401) and the cousins remained at peace.

== Background ==
The family of Gediminas ruled a state that covered the territories of present-day Lithuania, Belarus, Ukraine, Transnistria, and parts of Poland and Russia. Gediminas died in 1341; afterwards his sons Algirdas and Kęstutis, the fathers of Jogaila and Vytautas, co-ruled the Grand Duchy peacefully. However, after Algirdas' death in 1377, Kęstutis, Jogaila, and Vytautas began a power struggle. During their first conflict, the Lithuanian Civil War between 1381 and 1384, Vytautas and Jogaila both struck short-lived alliances with the Teutonic Knights. Vytautas did not manage to seize the throne and reconciled with Jogaila in 1384.

Jogaila created a significant new alliance with the Kingdom of Poland when he secured an agreement, known as the Union of Krewo (August 1385), to marry the twelve-year-old Queen of Poland Jadwiga of Poland. He married Jadwiga and was crowned jure uxoris king of Poland in February 1386. As a condition to the marriage and coronation, Jogaila agreed to renounce paganism himself and Christianize his subjects, and establish a personal union between Poland and Lithuania. The Union was an unwelcome development for the Teutonic Knights, as it united Poland and Lithuania, two states hostile to the Order, and a Christianized Lithuania deprived the Knights of their ideological justification for waging the Lithuanian Crusade. Thus the Order sought opportunities to undo the Polish–Lithuanian union; they demanded Samogitia, a section of western Lithuania that bordered the Baltic Sea, and refused to recognize Jogaila's baptism in 1386.

Vytautas became duke of Hrodna and Podlaskie; Jogaila known now by his Christian name Władysław II (Władysław II Jagiełło) designated his brother Skirgaila regent in Lithuania. Skirgaila, who also ruled Vytautas' patrimony in Trakai, was disliked by the Lithuanian nobility. Vytautas, on the other hand, became increasingly popular; Władysław II began to see him as a rival. Vytautas was supported by Lithuanians who resented the Polish interpretation of the recent Union of Krewo. These Lithuanians wished to maintain distinct legal structures and reserve official posts for Lithuanians. The Lithuanian elites also resented the changes in government that king Władysław II implemented there.

== Civil war ==
=== 1389–1390 ===
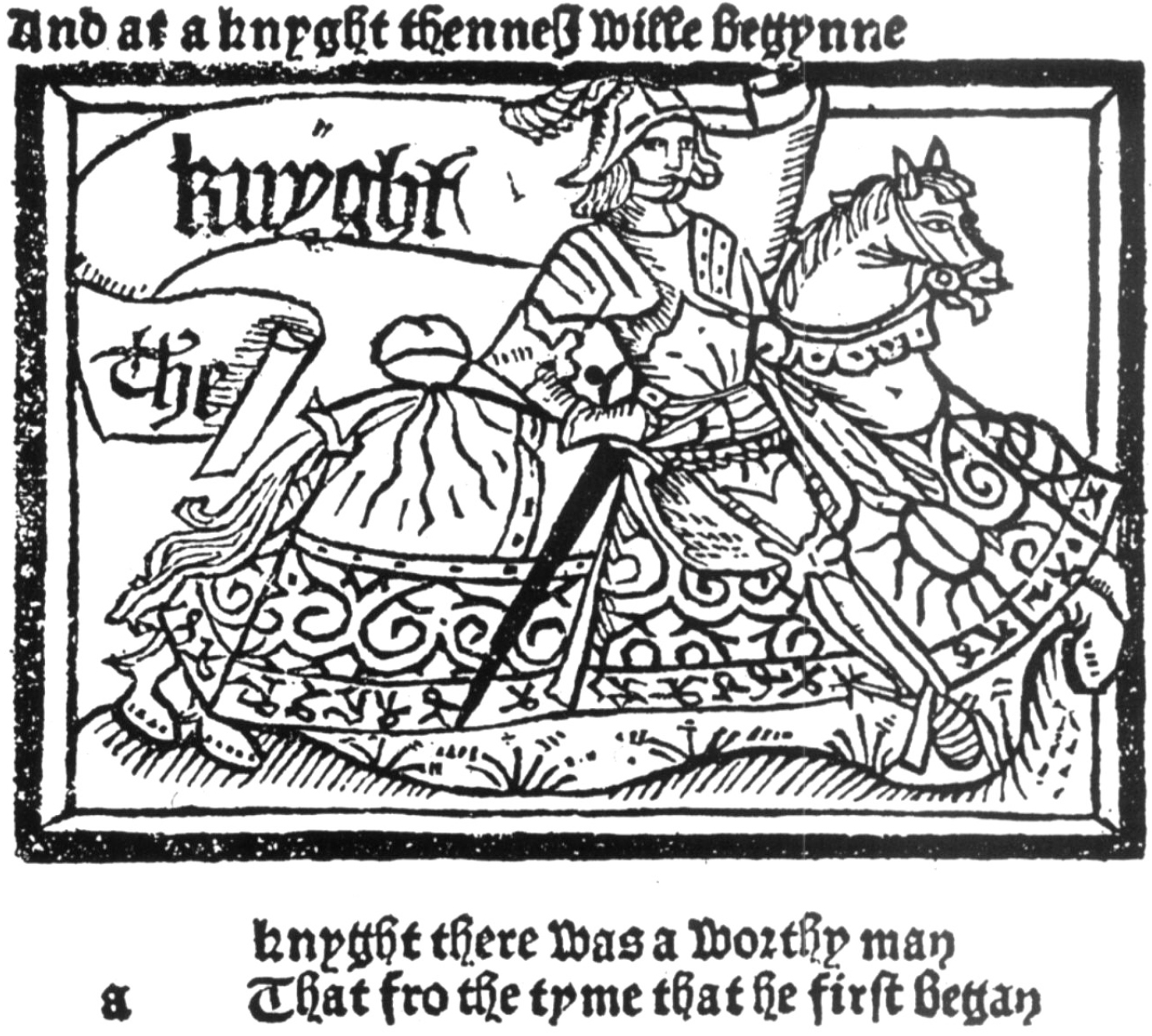
Portrait of an English Knight, from the General Prologue of The Canterbury Tales. The fictional knight took part in many crusades, including one against the Lithuanians.

Jogaila had sent Klemens Moskarzewski to establish a Polish garrison in Vilnius and stabilize the situation, but this move only angered the opposition. In May 1389 Jogaila tried to mediate the conflict between Skirgaila and Vytautas in Lublin. Vytautas was pressured into signing a formal document declaring that he was loyal to Skirgaila and supported him, but his position as Duke of Lutsk was not formally acknowledged. Vytautas secured his position in Lutsk, and turned his sights on Vilnius. According to Teutonic testimony at the Council of Constance, Vytautas planned to take advantage of his sister's wedding by sending wagons filled with meat, hay, and other goods to Vilnius. The wagons would be escorted by armed men, who would capture the castle once inside the city. This plan was uncovered by a German spy and the conspirators were executed. In another setback, two of Vytautas' strongest allies, his brother Tautvilas and his brother-in-law Ivan Olshanski, lost their territories in Navahrudak and Halshany.

Vytautas then sought a military alliance with the Knights, sending captive knight Marquard von Salzbach to negotiate. On 19 January 1390 in Lyck Vytautas signed the Treaty of Lyck affirming the terms of an earlier agreement, the Treaty of Königsberg, signed in 1384 during his first conflict with Jogaila. Under the terms of this treaty, the Knights were promised Samogitia, up to the Nevėžis River, in exchange for their military assistance. Having been earlier betrayed, the Knights asked for hostages as a guarantee of Vytautas' loyalty: his brothers Sigismund and Tautvilas, his wife Anna, his daughter Sophia, his sister Rymgajla, his favorite Ivan Olshanski, and a number of other nobles.

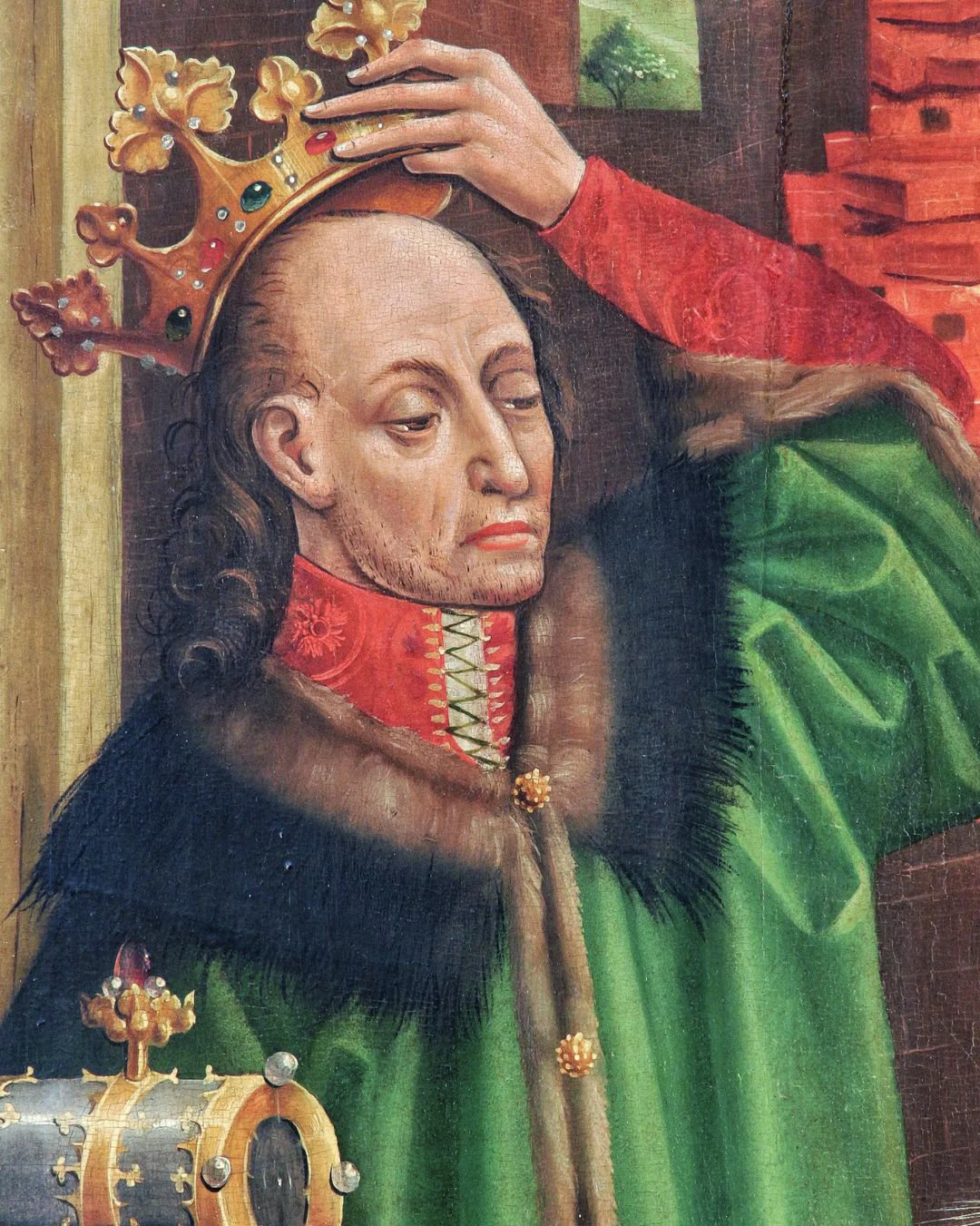
Jogaila, later known as Władysław II Jagiełło

In May, a delegation of 31 Samogitian nobles arrived in Königsberg and promised loyalty to Vytautas by signing the Treaty of Königsberg. The joint forces of Vytautas and the Teutonic Knights consisted largely of volunteers and mercenaries from western Europe, notably from France, the German states, and England. Henry, Earl of Derby, the future King Henry IV of England and Marshal of France Jean Le Maingre were among the participants. The English crusaders left detailed records of their actions in Prussia and Lithuania, and their exploits were mentioned by Geoffrey Chaucer in the Canterbury Tales, possibly as a compliment to the English knights and the future king. In the meantime, Jogaila achieved some military successes; his forces captured several castles in Podlaskie, leaving them to be guarded by Polish garrisons, and took Hrodna in April 1390 after a six-week siege.

The newly assembled coalition organized a number of small campaigns in Lithuania; the largest was undertaken at the end of summer. During this campaign the Knights burned wooden castles at Kernavė, possibly the first capital of Lithuania, which never recovered from the destruction. While the army was laying siege to Georgenburg, Grand Master Conrad Zöllner von Rothenstein died. The coalition decided to abandon this siege and march on Vilnius instead, as such a large army could not easily be re-assembled. On 11 September 1390, the joint forces launched a five-week siege on the city. Vilnius' castles were held by Skirgaila, commanding combined Polish, Lithuanian, and Ruthenian troops. The Knights reduced much of the outer city to ruins and managed to destroy the Crooked Castle, which was never rebuilt. Vytautas' brother Tautvilas Kęstutaitis and Jogaila's brother Karigaila died during the siege. The besiegers ran into various difficulties. Their supplies of gunpowder were dwindling, the weather was deteriorating, the terms of service for some volunteers from western Europe ended, and the Knights needed a new Grand Master. They decided to return to Prussia. The siege did not bring an end to the conflict, but it demonstrated an increased dissatisfaction with Jogaila among the regional inhabitants.

=== 1391–1392 ===
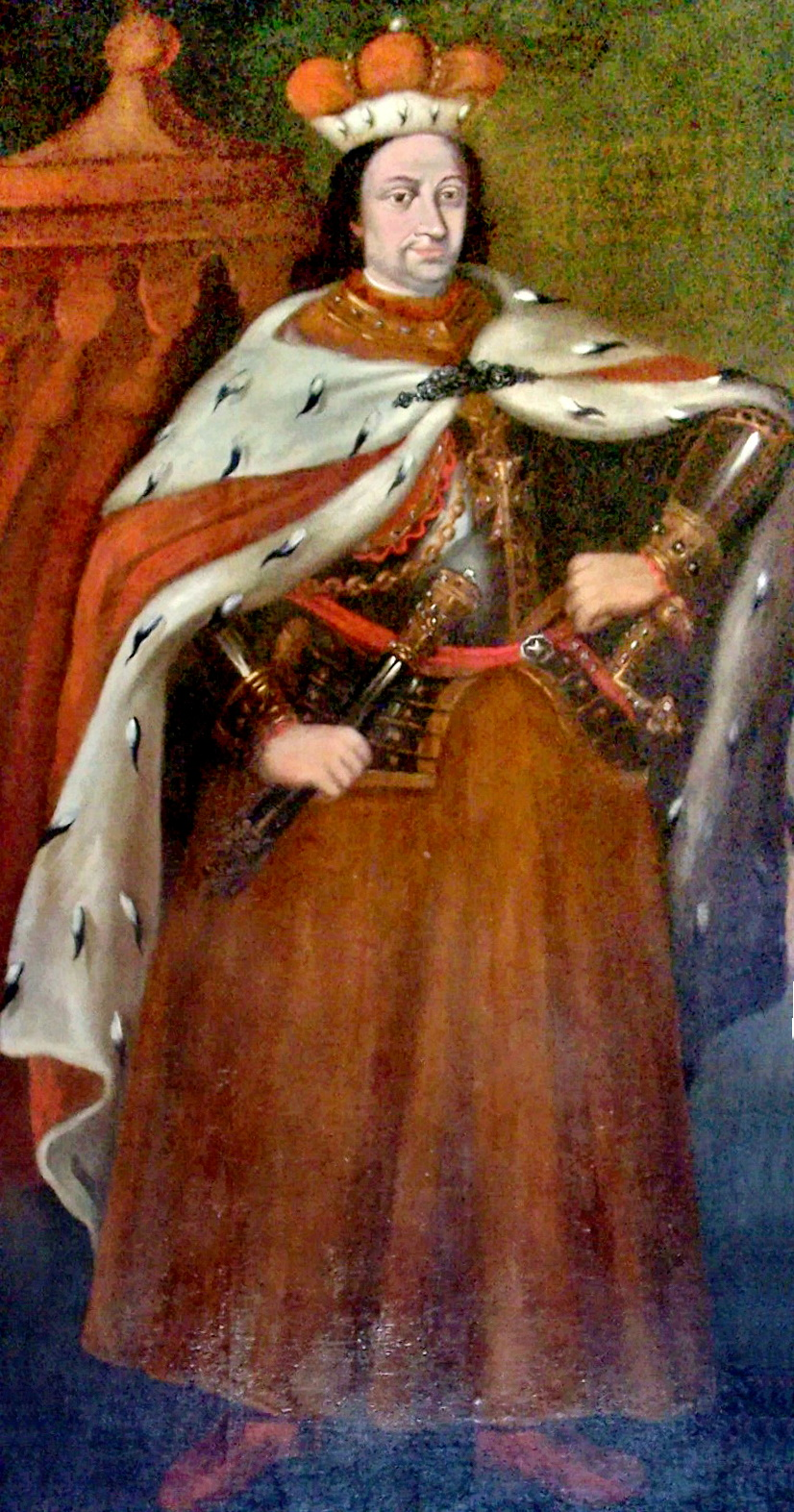
Vytautas the Great

On 21 January 1391 Vytautas' only daughter, Sophia of Lithuania, married Vasili I of Russia, Grand Duke of Moscow. This alliance strengthened Vytautas' influence in Slavic lands and represented a potential new ally against Poland. At the same time, Jogaila's brother Lengvenis was losing his power in Veliky Novgorod to Moscow. The Teutonic Knights were idled during the protracted selection of their new Grand Master, Konrad von Wallenrode; their general chapter delayed his election. In May 1391, the new master mortgaged Złotoria (Slatoria), a castle near Thorn, from Władysław Opolczyk, count palatine of Sigismund of Hungary, for 6,632 guldens. This angered Jogaila and he invaded Dobrzyń Land, but was driven away.

Von Wallenrode called for new volunteers from France, England, and Scotland. Among those who responded was William Douglas of Nithsdale. During the autumn of 1391 the Teutonic Knights organized another campaign against Vilnius. In Kaunas they organized a lavish feast, which was prominently featured in Konrad Wallenrod, an 1828 poem by Adam Mickiewicz. They devastated the nearby towns of Ukmergė and Maišiagala, but lacked the resources for a second siege on Vilnius. In November 1391 Vytautas attacked the areas near Merkinė and Hrodna, cutting off the easiest communication route between Jogaila and Skirgaila.

In the meantime the Knights were buying lands in Prussia. In May 1392, von Wallenrode began negotiations with Sigismund of Hungary to buy Neumark for 500,000 guldens. Negotiations fell apart as the title to the land was contested by several dukes. The Neumark purchase was closed with Jobst of Moravia only in 1402. During July 1392, the Knights agreed to pay Władysław Opolczyk 50,000 guldens for the Dobrzyń Land, which had been contested among Piast dukes since 1377. Opolczyk, the ruler of Opole in Silesia, had little interest in the volatile regions to his north. In 1392, he circulated a proposal to partition Poland among the Teutonic Knights, the Holy Roman Empire, Silesia, and Hungary, but it was rejected. These purchases by the Knights threatened Poland's northern borders.

Neither Jogaila nor Vytautas had gained a clear advantage and the territories of the Grand Duchy affected by the civil war were being devastated. Polish nobles were dissatisfied with the war; Jogaila was spending a great deal of time on Lithuanian matters and the expected benefits of the Union of Krewo had not materialized. The Union was meant to strengthen Polish control over Galicia, Moldavia, and Wallachia rather than to create fresh troubles in the north. Jogaila was preoccupied with the management of his court, battles in the southeast, and his sickly wife. He attempted to replace Skirgaila with his younger brother Vygantas, but this brother died under unclear circumstances – according to rumor he was poisoned by either Vytautas or Skirgaila. Klemens Moskarzewski was replaced with Jan Oleśnicki from Kraków as governor of Vilnius. Jogaila decided to seek a compromise with Vytautas.

== Peace treaty ==
In spring 1392, Jogaila proposed a compromise through his envoy, Henry of Masovia, Bishop of Płock: Vytautas would become the Grand Duke of Lithuania if he would recognize Jogaila as the Supreme Duke. By summer, Vytautas had secured the release of many of the hostages he had given to the Knights, and accepted the offer. Since this agreement with Jogaila was reached in secret, the Knights suspected nothing when Vytautas invited them to the festivities at his headquarters, the Ritterswerder Castle on an island in the Neman River. Most of the prominent guests were taken prisoner and Vytautas' army proceeded to attack and destroy the undermanned wooden castles of Ritterswerder, Metenburg, and Neugarten (New Hrodna) near Hrodna.

The Ostrów Agreement, formalizing the arrangement and ending the civil war, was signed on 4 August 1392. Vytautas became regent for Jogaila and reclaimed his patrimony in Trakai while Skirgaila was compensated with the Principality of Kiev, where he died in 1397. While Vytautas was technically ruling only on Jogaila's behalf, he in fact exercise power in the Grand Duchy equal to that of sovereign ruler. His formal recognition as the Grand Duke (with Jogaila as dominant co-ruler and Supreme Duke) was legalized in the 1401 Union of Vilnius and Radom. Vytautas ruled Lithuania until his death in 1430; his relationship with Jogaila during these years is sometimes likened to the peaceful power-sharing demonstrated by their fathers Algirdas and Kęstutis. The Knights, betrayed for the second time, resumed their wars against Lithuania. They sought to take Samogitia, which Vytautas had twice promised them. The Treaty of Salynas was signed in 1398, leaving Samogitia to the Knights, to quiet the Duchy's western front while Vytautas was organizing a major campaign against the Golden Horde. Vytautas suffered a major defeat at the Battle of the Vorskla River in 1399. The cousins joined their forces at the Battle of Grunwald in 1410, which ended the threat from the Teutonic Orders.

== See also ==
- List of conflicts in Europe
- List of wars involving Lithuania
- List of wars involving the Polish–Lithuanian Commonwealth
- List of wars of succession in Europe
