= 1386 =

1386 in various calendars
- Gregorian calendar: 1386; MCCCLXXXVI
- Ab urbe condita: 2139
- Armenian calendar: 835; ԹՎ ՊԼԵ
- Assyrian calendar: 6136
- Balinese saka calendar: 1307–1308
- Bengali calendar: 792–793
- Berber calendar: 2336
- English Regnal year: 9 Ric. 2 – 10 Ric. 2
- Buddhist calendar: 1930
- Burmese calendar: 748
- Byzantine calendar: 6894–6895
- Chinese calendar: 乙丑年 (Wood Ox); 4083 or 3876 — to — 丙寅年 (Fire Tiger); 4084 or 3877
- Coptic calendar: 1102–1103
- Discordian calendar: 2552
- Ethiopian calendar: 1378–1379
- Hebrew calendar: 5146–5147
- Hindu calendars
- Vikram Samvat: 1442–1443
- Shaka Samvat: 1307–1308
- Kali Yuga: 4486–4487
- Holocene calendar: 11386
- Igbo calendar: 386–387
- Iranian calendar: 764–765
- Islamic calendar: 787–788
- Japanese calendar: Shitoku 3 (至徳３年)
- Javanese calendar: 1299–1300
- Julian calendar: 1386; MCCCLXXXVI
- Korean calendar: 3719
- Minguo calendar: 526 before ROC 民前526年
- Nanakshahi calendar: −82
- Thai solar calendar: 1928–1929
- Tibetan calendar: ཤིང་མོ་གླང་ལོ་ (female Wood-Ox); 1512 or 1131 or 359 — to — མེ་ཕོ་སྟག་ལོ་ (male Fire-Tiger); 1513 or 1132 or 360

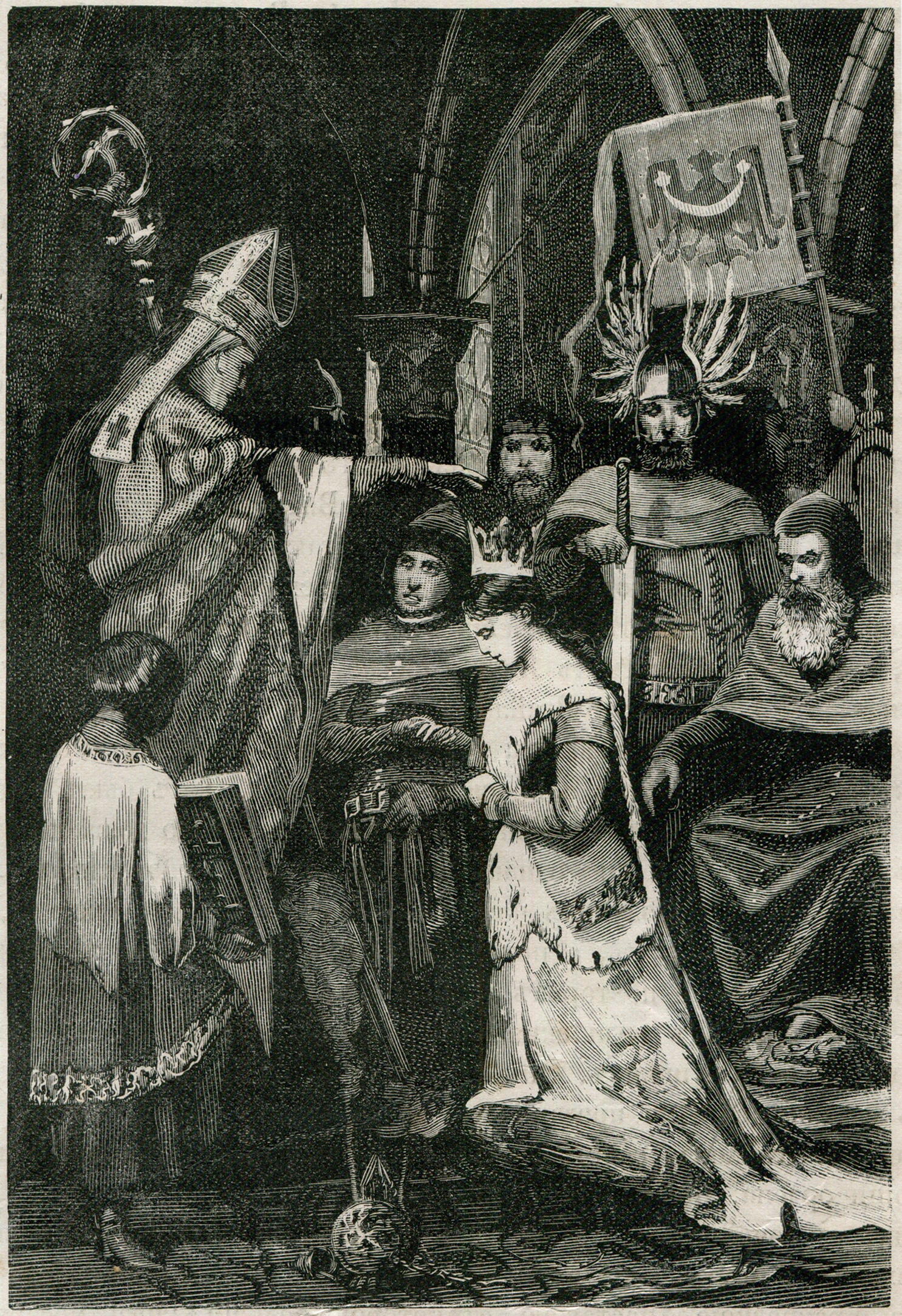
February 18: The Grand Duke Jogaila of Lithuania marries Queen Jadwiga of Poland and unites the two nations.

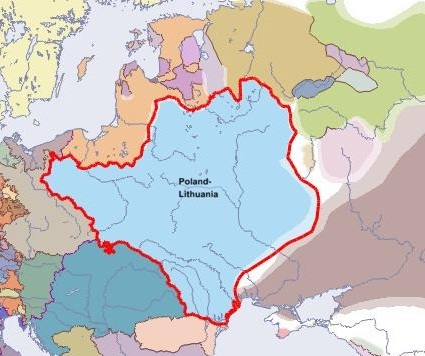
The new Polish-Lithuanian Commonwealth is created.

Year 1386 (MCCCLXXXVI) was a common year starting on Monday of the Julian calendar.

== Events ==
=== January–March ===
- January 6 – Officials from the Swiss Canton of Lucerne, arrive in the village of Sempach, at the time under control of Austria and the Habsburg family, and offer Swiss citizenship and rights. Lucerne's representatives enter into similar pacts with other Austrian-controlled towns, including Meienberg, and bring with them soldiers from the Swiss Confederacy.
- January 11 – Union of Krewo: A delegation of Poland's nobles visits the Grand Duke Jogaila of Lithuania at Valkaviskas (now Vawkavysk in Belarus and informs him that they will elect him as the new King of Poland on the condition that he convert from Lithuania's polytheistic religion to Christianity, and that he marry the Queen of Jadwiga of Poland. Jogaila agrees to the terms.
- January 14 – The Austrian garrison at Meienberg responds to the overtures from the Swiss canton of Lucerne and kills over 140 of the Swiss Confederacy troops, starting a war between the two nations.
- February 1 – Meeting at Lublin, the nobles of Poland elect Grand Duke Jogaila as King of Poland.
- February 13 – The Republic of Venice takes control of the island of Corfu.
- February 15 – Grand Duke Jogaila of Lithuania is baptized by the Roman Catholic Bishop Bodzanta of Gniezno at Wawel Cathedral, Kraków after converting to Christianity, and takes the name Wladyslaw II.
- February 18 – Grand Duke Jogaila of Lithuania marries Queen Jadwiga of Poland, unifying the two nations.
- February 24 – Elizabeth of Bosnia, the mother of the overthrown Queen Mary of Hungary and Croatia, arranges the assassination of Charles III of Naples, the ruler of Hungary, Naples, Achaea and Croatia, with the result that Mary is reinstated as Queen of Hungary and Croatia; Charles' son, Ladislaus, becomes King of Naples; and a period of interregnum begins in Achaea, lasting until 1396. The rule of Achaea is sought by numerous pretenders, none of whom can be considered to have reigned.
- March 4 – Jogaila, Grand Duke of Lithuania is crowned Władysław II Jagiełło, King of Poland, beginning the Jagiellonian dynasty.

=== April–June ===
- April 29 – The Lithuanian Army, led by Skirgaila, conquers the Principality of Smolensk in the Battle of the Vikhra River.Prince Sviatoslav IV, who had supported a rebellion by Grand Duke Jolaila's younger brother Andrei of Polotsk, is killed in combat and Smolensk becomes a vassal state of Lithuania.
- May 9 – King John I of Portugal and King Richard II of England ratify the Treaty of Windsor.
- June 9 – Queen Elizabeth of Hungary pledges to assist King Wladyslaw II of Poland against his enemies, the Teutonic Knights, who question the legitimacy of the King's marriage to Queen Jadigwa.
- June 26 – Heidelberg University is opened by Ruprecht I, Count Palatine of the Rhine seven months after he received permission from Pope Urban V to create a school studium generale. Formal establishment will take place on October 19.

=== July–September ===
- July 9 –
  - Battle of Sempach: Soldiers from cantons of the Old Swiss Confederacy defeat the Austrian Habsburg Army in a battle that leads to the unification of the cantons into the nation of Switzerland.
  - John of Gaunt, Duke of Lancaster and oldest surviving son of the late King Edward II of England, departs from England with 5,000 men and a fleet of English and Portuguese ships to make good his claim to the throne of Castile. John, whose nephew became King Richard II upon Edward's death, claims the Castilian throne by right of his marriage to Constanza of Castile in 1371.
- July 25 – Elizabeth of Bosnia, mother of Queen Jadwiga of Poland is kidnapped by Croatian rebels at Gorjani, along with Jadwiga's sister, Queen consort Mary of Hungary Mary, when they are ambushed by John Horvat and his men while traviling to Dakovo. Nicholas I Garai, who had accompanied Elizabeth and Mary, is murdered and his severed head is sent by the rebels to Margaret of Durazzo, the former Queen consort of Hungary and Naples, as proof that the murderers of her husband King Charles III, have been captured.
- August 8 – King Richard II of England summons the members of the House of Commons and the House of Lords to assemble at Westminster Abbey on October 1 for his 14th Parliament, dubbed by historians as the "Wonderful Parliament". Although the King's purpose is to secure funding to defend against an imminent invasion from France, the parliament members begin plans to reform the unpopular king's government.
- August 17 – Karl Thopia, Prince of Albania, enters into an alliance with the Republic of Venice. Albania agrees to participate in all wars of the Republic or to pay auxiliary funds and supply grain, as well as to protect Venetian buyers in Albania. [19] In return, Venice supplies a galley to Albania and protect Albania's coast from the Ottoman Empire.
- September 23 – Dan I of Wallachia (modern-day southern Romania) is killed in battle against the Bulgarians and is succeeded by Mircea the Elder, one of the greatest rulers of Wallachia.

=== October–December ===
- October 1 – The "Wonderful Parliament" is opened at Westminster by King Richard's Chancellor Michael de la Pole, while King Richard declines to attend after failing to call off his decision to summon the members.
- October 18 – Heidelberg University (Ruprecht-Karls-Universität Heidelberg), the oldest in Germany, is founded at the behest of Rupert I, Elector Palatine, by charter of Pope Urban VI.
- November 21 – The Mongol conqueror Timur, called "Tamerlane" in the west, captures and sacks the Georgian capital of Tbilisi, taking King Bagrat V prisoner.
- December 24 – Al-Burhan Ahmad al-Zahiri, (Burhan), Khalid al-Himsi, and Amin ad-Din Ibn al-Najib, arrested in September on charges of conspiring to assassinate the Egyptian Sultan Barquq, are brought to Cairo to face trial.

=== Date unknown ===
- Abu al-Abbas is reinstated as ruler of the Marinid dynasty in modern-day Morocco.
- Construction begins on the Brancacci Chapel in Florence.
- Construction begins on the Milan Cathedral.
- Rozhdestvensky monastery is built in Muscovy.

== Births ==
- March 12 – Ashikaga Yoshimochi, Japanese shōgun (d. 1428)
- June 24 – Giovanni da Capistrano, Italian saint (d. 1456)
- September 16 (probable date) – King Henry V of England (d. 1422)
- date unknown – Niccolò Piccinino, Italian mercenary (d. 1444)
- probable – Donatello, Italian sculptor (d. 1466)

== Deaths ==
- July 9 – Leopold III, Duke of Austria (in battle) (b. 1351)
- August 20 – Bo Jonsson (Grip), royal marshal of Sweden
- September 23 – Dan I of Wallachia (in battle)
- December 31 – Johanna of Bavaria, Queen of Bohemia (b. c. 1362)
- date unknown
  - Al-Wathiq II, caliph of Cairo
  - Takatsukasa Fuyumichi, Japanese nobleman (b. 1330)
- probable – William Langland, English poet (b. 1332)
