= Monastery of the Holy Spirit, Vitebsk =

Monastery in Vitebsk, Belarus

Coordinates: 55°11′42″N 30°12′6″E

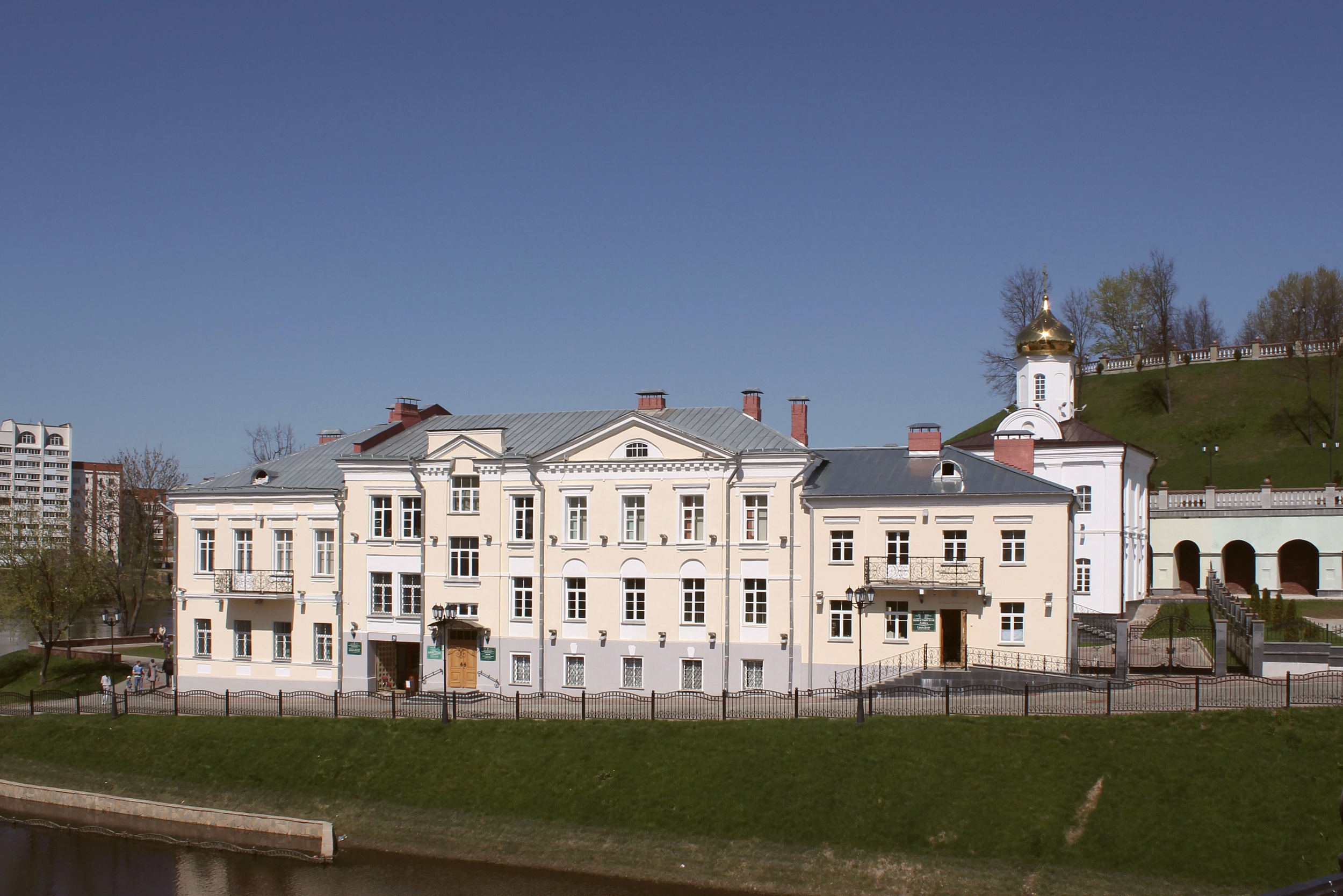
Monastery of the Holy Spirit in Vitebsk

Monastery of the Holy Spirit (Sviato-Dukhov Monastery) is a female Eastern Orthodox monastery in Vitebsk, Belarus.

The monastery was founded in the 1380s by Duchess Uliana of Tver, wife of Algirdas, Grand Duke of Lithuania. Algirdas ordered the construction of the Cathedral of the Holy Spirit in this monastery. About 1392–1393, after Algirdas' death, Uliania took the vows of schema in her monastery.

From the mid-17th century till 1839, the monastery was Greek-Catholic. In 1839, after the cancellation of the Union of Brest, it was converted back to Orthodoxy and was soon shut down because of poverty. After the October Revolution the majority of the old monastery's buildings were destroyed.

The monastery was revived in 2001. At present, it owns one building.

== See also ==
- Troitsky Markov Monastery
