= Vygantas =

Lithuanian noble (died 1392)

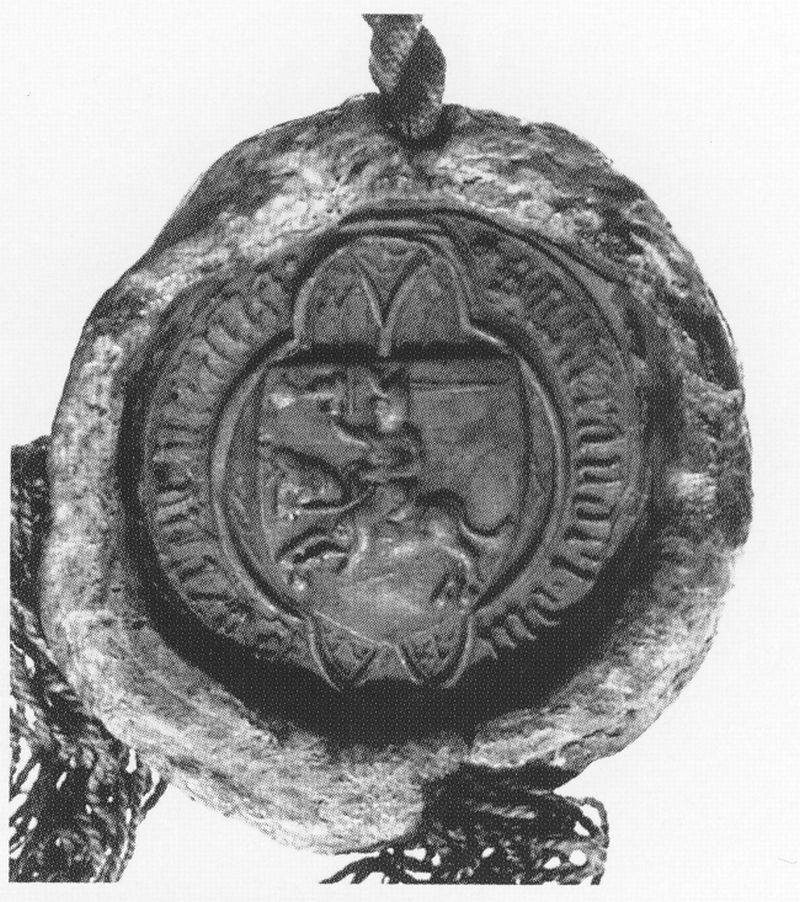
Seal of Vygantas, Duke of Kernavė, 1388

Vygantas (baptized Alexander; Polish: Wigunt; died June 28, 1392, in Vilnius) was Duke of Kernavė. He was one of the sons of Algirdas, Grand Duke of Lithuania (1345–1377), and his second wife Uliana Alexandrovna of Tver.

In 1385, Vygantas supported his older brother Jogaila by signing the Union of Krewo. On February 18, 1386, he was baptized as Alexander. In the same year he was betrothed to Jadwiga, daughter of Władysław Opolczyk. He married her in 1390. Polish nobles expected that Władysław would grant Vygantas the Dobrzyń Land, a contested territory between Poland and the Teutonic Knights, as his dowry. Vygantas received Kuyavia from Jogaila instead. In 1388, he supported Poland in an armed conflict with the Teutonic Knights. He also supported Władysław Jagiełło (Jogaila) in the Lithuanian Civil War (1389–1392) against Vytautas. Vygantas was considered as a replacement for unpopular Skirgaila as Grand Duke of Lithuania. However, he soon died in Vilnius. The rumors had it that he was poisoned – either by Vytautas or Skirgaila. He is buried in Vilnius Cathedral together with his brother Karigaila, who died in the civil war in 1390.

Vygantas should not be confused with his brother Andrei of Polotsk, who is sometimes referred to as Wigunt-Andrei following the confused 15th-century chronicles of Jan Długosz. Kazimierz Stadnicki in his work Bracia Władysława-Jagiełły Olgierdowicza (published in 1867) suggested that Vygantas and his elder brother Theodore were the same person, but this theory was rejected.

== See also ==
- Family of Algirdas – family tree of Vygantas
