= Troitsky Markov Monastery =

Coordinates: 55°10′18″N 30°09′16″E

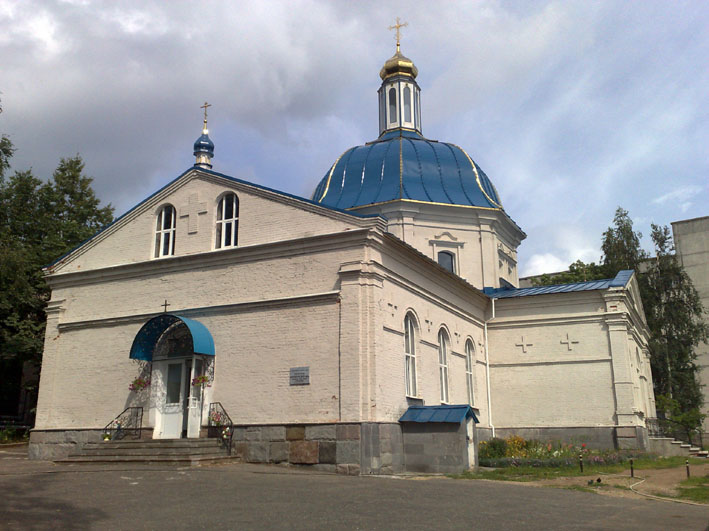
Svyato-Troitsky Markov Monastery

The Svyato-Troitsky Markov Monastery (Holy Trinity Markov Monastery) is one of two modern-day monasteries in Vitebsk. The second, for females, is Svyato-Dukhov Monastery. Markov Monastery was founded in the 14th–15th century. A legend indicates that a certain Mark found a place to stay alone and built a chapel there. Afterwards he was joined by like-minded persons, who formed the monastery. The monastery existed until 1576, when it was abolished. At that time, the monastery's Тrinity Church became a parish church. The monastery was revived in 1633 by a duke Lev Oginski.

In the 12th century the wooden Troitsky (Trinity) Cathedral and Pokrovskaya (Intercession) Church existed in the monastery area. In 1656 Patriarch of Moscow Nikon presented the monastery with a miraculous copy of Kazan Virgin icon. In 1690 the Pokrovskaya (Intercession) Church was burned down was reconstructed. In 1760 a stone cathedral was constructed to house the Kazan Virgin icon. After the October Revolution, in 1920, the Svyato-Troitsky Markov Monastery was again suppressed. All the buildings except the Kazan Cathedral of 1760 were demolished. The Kazan church was the only functioning Vitebsk church during the Soviet era. The monastery was revived again on 23 November 2000. Now it is situated at an industrial site, surrounded by factory buildings.
