= Maria of Vitebsk =

Maria/Anna of Vitebsk
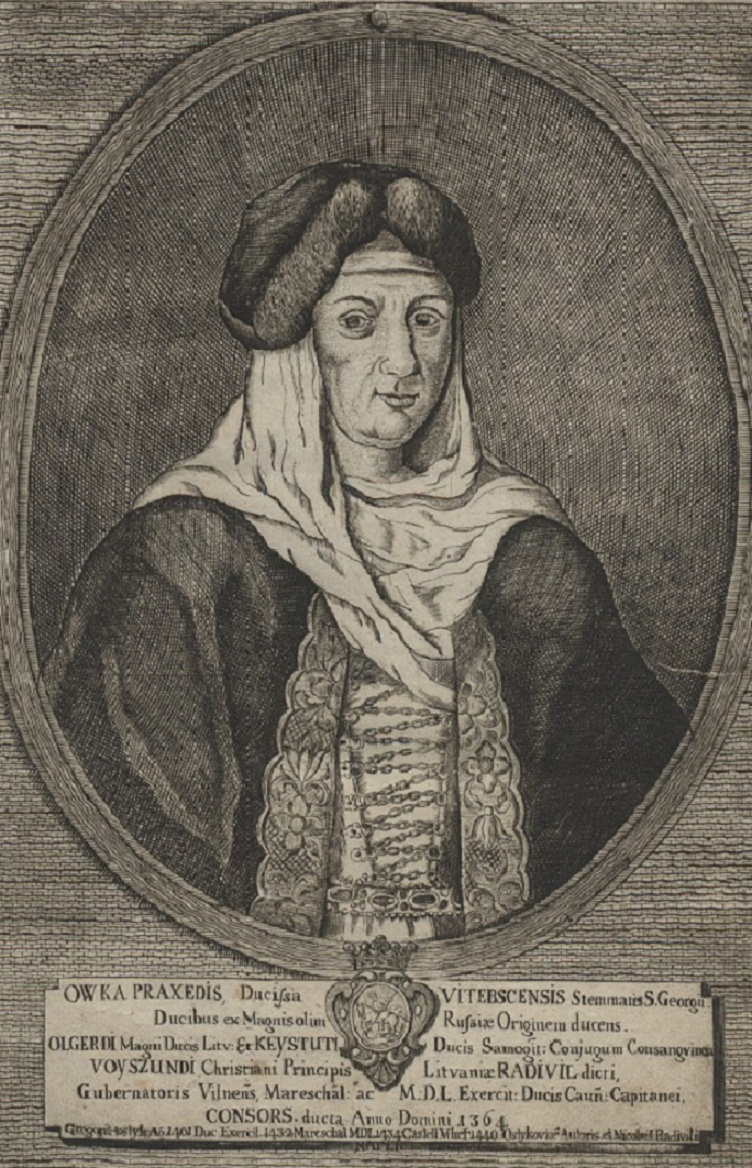
- Born: c. 1300; Vitebsk, Principality of Vitebsk
- Died: c. 1348; Vilnius, Grand Duchy of Lithuania
- Spouse: Algirdas
- House: Izyaslavichi of Polotsk (branch of the Rurikids)
- Father: Yaroslav Vasilievich (Jaroslavas Vasiljevičius)
- Religion: Eastern Orthodoxy

Maria of Vitebsk (Russian: Мария Ярославна Витебская, romanized: Marija Jaroslavna; Lithuanian: Marija Vitebskietė) or Anna of Vitebsk (c. 1300 – c. 1346) was the first wife of Algirdas, the future Grand Duke of Lithuania (marriage took place c. 1318).

== Life ==
Very little is known about her life. As the only child of a Russian prince Yaroslav, she was the only heir to the Principality of Vitebsk. After her father's death in c. 1345, Vitebsk fell permanently under control of Algirdas and other Gediminids.

She gave birth to five sons, all of whom grew up while Algirdas was still only a regional duke in the Christianized lands of the Grand Duchy of Lithuania. All five sons were baptized in the Orthodox rite and ruled Russian lands giving rise to prominent clans of Russian dukes (Trubetskoy family from Dmitry of Bryansk, Czartoryski family from Constantine, Sanguszko family from Fiodor, Belsky and Olelkovich families from Vladimir).

After her death, Algirdas married another Russian princess, Uliana of Tver. Algirdas initially named as his heir one of younger sons of his first wife, Fedor, before ultimately changing his mind and placing in this position a son of Julianna, Jagiełło.

== Issue ==
1. Andrei of Polotsk (1325 – 12 August 1399 in the Battle of the Vorskla River), Prince of Polotsk (1342–1387), Pskov (1342–1348)
2. Dmitry of Bryansk (1327 – 12 August 1399 in the Battle of the Vorskla River), Duke of Bryansk (1356–1379 and 1388–1399)
3. Constantine (died before 30 October 1390), Prince of Chortoryisk. According to J. Tęgowski, he may be son of Karijotas.
4. Vladimir Olgerdovich (died after October 1398), Grand Prince of Kiev (1362–1394), Kapyl, Slutsk. Ancestor of Olelkovich and Belsky families.
5. Fedor (Theodore; died in 1399), Crown Prince of Lithuania until 1377, Prince of Rylsk (1370–1399), Ratnie (1387–1394), Bryansk (1393)
6. Theodora, wife of Sviatoslav Titovich of Karachev
7. Agrypina (baptized Mary; died in 1393), wife of Boris of Suzdal
