= Lengvenis =

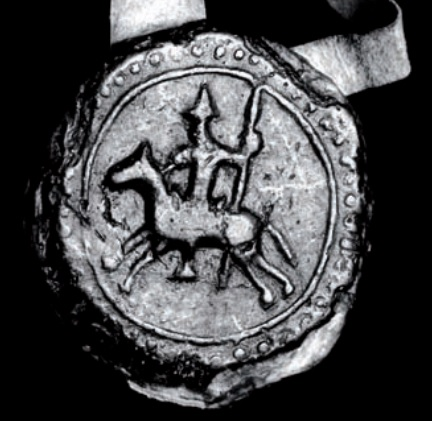
- Seal of Lengvenis, dating to 1379

Prince of Novgorod
- Reign: 1389–1392, 1406–1411
- Predecessor: Dmitry Donskoy
- Successor: Vasily III Dmitriyevich

Prince of Mstsislaw
- Reign: 1392–1431
- Predecessor: Karigaila
- Born: c. 1360
- Died: after 19 June 1431
- Spouse: Maria Dmitriyevna of Moscow
- Dynasty: Gediminid
- Father: Algirdas
- Mother: Uliana of Tver

Lengvenis (Note: Belarusian: Лугвен-Сымон, Łuhvien; Russian: Лугвений, Лугвен, Лугвень, Lugven(y), Polish: Lingwen Semen Olgierdowicz.) (c. 1360 – after 19 June 1431) was one of the sons of Algirdas, Grand Duke of Lithuania, who was the prince of Novgorod (1389–1392; 1406–1411). He was one of the most famous commanders of Vytautas the Great. He was baptized in the Eastern Orthodox rite as Semën to be titled the prince of Novgorod.

== Life ==
Lengvenis was born to Algirdas and his second wife Uliana of Tver. In 1387, Lengvenis commanded one of Lithuanian formations in a battle with the Teutonic Order. Invited by the Novgorodians themselves, Lengvenis was first regent in Great Novgorod in 1389–1392, responsible to Jogaila, the Grand Duke of Lithuania. He was baptized in the Eastern Orthodox rite as Semën and received the title of Prince of Great Novgorod. After Lengvenis lost this title in 1392, Vytautas the Great appointed him in 1393 as the Prince of Mstislavl in then eastern Lithuania. In 1406–1411, Lengvenis, once again, was regent of Great Novgorod, this time responsible to Vytautas. As ruler of Novgorod he led battles against Pskov Republic, Livonian Order, and Sweden.

In 1410, Lengvenis participated in the Battle of Grunwald. He led his own "banner", and a certain Georgy- the next banner in the famous list of chronicler Jan Długosz. Often this George is considered the son of Lengvenis, Yury. Many historians believe that under the command of Lengvenis there were three banners of Smolensk land, which played a significant role in the battle. In 1411 Lengvenis participated in the signing of the Peace of Thorn. He was married to Maria Dmitrovna, princess of Moscow, the daughter of Dmitry Donskoy.

In 1380, he founded the Monastery of the Dormition in Pustynki near Mstsislaw in then eastern Lithuania, now Belarus.

== See also ==
- House of Algirdas – family tree of Lengvenis

== Sources ==
- Batūra, Romas (2005), "Lengvenis", Gediminaičiai (in Lithuanian), compiled by Vytautas Spečiūnas, Vilnius: Institute of Science and Encyclopedia Publishing, ISBN 5-420-01558-7
- Batūra, Romas (2018-09-12). "Lengvenis Algirdaitis". vle.lt (in Lithuanian).
- Jučas, Mečislovas (1990). Žalgirio mūšis (Battle of Grunwald). Vilnius: Mokslas, 174. ISBN 5-420-00242-6. (in Lithuanian)
