= Uliana of Tver =

Grand Duchess of Lithuania from 1349 to 1377

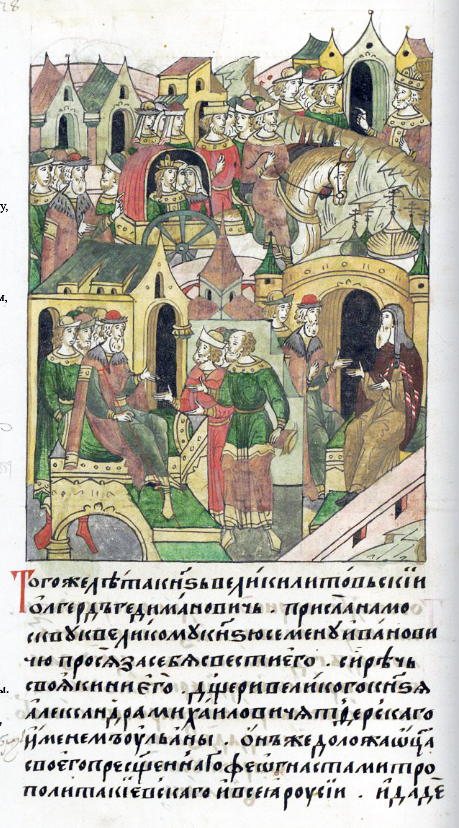
- Wedding of Uliana and Algirdas, miniature from the Illustrated Chronicle of Ivan the Terrible (16th century)

Grand Duchess consort of Lithuania
- Tenure: 1349 – May 1377

Princess regnant of Vitebsk
- Reign: 1377–1391
- Predecessor: Algirdas
- Successor: Fedor Vesna
- Born: c. 1325
- Died: 17 March 1391 (aged 65–66)
- Spouse: Algirdas
- Issue: Jogaila; Skirgaila; Kaributas; Lengvenis; Karigaila; Vygantas; Švitrigaila
- House: Rurik
- Father: Alexander of Tver
- Religion: Russian Orthodox

Uliana or Iulianiya Aleksandrovna (Note: Lithuanian: Julijona iš Tverės; Russian: Иулиания Александровна; also spelled as Ulyana, or Yuliania, or Yulianiya.) (monastic name: Marina; c. 1325 – 17 March 1391) was the grand duchess of Lithuania as the second wife of Algirdas from 1349 to 1377. She was the daughter of Alexander of Tver.

== Life ==
She was born around 1325. After her father and eldest brother were murdered by Öz Beg Khan in 1339, Uliana was placed in care of Simeon of Moscow, who married Uliana's elder sister Maria in 1347.

In 1349, Algirdas, the grand duke of Lithuania, sent an embassy to the Golden Horde, proposing to the khan, Jani Beg, to form an alliance against Simeon of Moscow; this proposal was not accepted and the envoys, including Algirdas' brother Karijotas, were imprisoned and held for ransom. Algirdas then concluded peace with Simeon and married Simeon's sister-in-law Uliana. She was the second Russian princess to marry Algirdas. Simeon first asked for the opinion of Metropolitan Theognostus whether a Christian lady could be married off to a pagan ruler. The same year, Algirdas' brother Liubartas married Olga, daughter of Konstantin Vasilyevich of Rostov and niece of Simeon.

Uliana rarely left home, devoting herself entirely to her children and to needlework. She also wielded considerable influence over her husband. In 1370, her brother Mikhail asked Algirdas to help him gain the Grand Principality of Vladimir from Dmitry of Moscow, and after he refused, Mikhail appealed to Uliana directly, prompting Algirdas to change his position and provide military assistance. Uliana is also said to have persuaded Algirdas to be baptized and take the Great Schema before his death. However, other Russian chronicles indicate that Algirdas remained pagan until his death.

After Algirdas's death in 1377, in accordance with his will, Uliana inherited the Principality of Vitebsk.

== Death and burial ==
There are conflicting claims about Uliana's last years and her burial place. In Russian historical tradition, there are four versions concerning her death and burial. The earliest account appears in what became known as the Chronicler of the Grand Dukes of Lithuania, compiled in the 1430s, which records her death in Vitebsk but does not mention her burial place or whether she had taken monastic vows. The Tver version, preserved in the Rogozhsky Chronicler and Simeonovskaya Chronicle, states that she took monastic vows before her death but does not specify where she died or was buried. The Moscow chronicle compilation of the late 15th century states that she became a nun under the name Marina and was buried in the Kiev Pechersk Lavra. Although traditional historiography has accepted Kiev as her burial place, there is a lack of archaeological evidence. Another account, found in the Epistle of Spiridon-Savva (1520s–1530s), places her burial in the Cathedral of the Theotokos in Vilnius. This version is supported by a silver plaque discovered during an 1810 construction.

The latest discovery was made during a restoration of the Transfiguration Church in Polotsk in March 2012. An inscription was found that recorded Uliana's death on the feast of Saint Alexius, which is March 17 in Eastern Orthodoxy.

On 5 December 2018, Uliania of Tver was canonized by the Ukrainian Autocephalous Orthodox Church.

== Issue ==
According to the research of Polish historian Jan Tęgowski, Uliana was frequently pregnant during her union with Algirdas, giving birth to eight sons and seven daughters in about 24 years, though some details, like birth order, are disputed:

- Kenna (baptized Joan; c. 1351 – 27 April 1367), wife of Casimir IV, Duke of Pomerania;
- Euphrosyne (c. 1352 – 1405/1406), wife of Oleg Ivanovich of Ryazan;
- Skirgaila (baptized Ivan; c. 1354 – 11 January 1397 in Kiev), duke of Trakai (1382–1395), Kiev (1395–1397), regent of Lithuania;
- Kaributas (baptized Dmitry; c. 1355 – after 1404), prince of Novgorod-Seversk (1386–1392/1393);
- Lengvenis (baptised Simon; c. 1356 – after 19 June 1431), prince of Mstislavl, regent of the Novgorod Republic;
- Helen (c. 1357 – 15 September 1437/1438), wife of Vladimir the Bold;
- Jogaila (baptized Władysław; c. 1362 – 1 June 1434), grand duke of Lithuania (1377–1381, 1382–1392), king of Poland (1386–1434);
- Maria (c. 1363 – after 1382), wife of Vaidila and David of Gorodets;
- Karigaila (baptized Casimir; c. 1364/1367 – 1390), prince of Mstislavl;
- Minigailo (c. 1365/1368 – by 1382);
- Alexandra (c. 1368/1370 – 19 June 1434), wife of Siemowit IV, Duke of Masovia;
- Wilheida (baptized Catherine; c. 1369/1374 – after 4 April 1422), wife of John II, Duke of Mecklenburg-Stargard;
- Vygantas (baptized Alexander; c. 1372 – 28 June 1392), prince of Kernavė;
- Švitrigaila (baptized Bolesław; c. 1373 – 10 February 1452 in Lutsk), grand duke of Lithuania (1430–1432), ruler of Volhynia (1437–1452);
- Jadwiga (c. 1375 – after 1407), wife of Jan III of Oświęcim.

It seems that the children, unlike children from Algirdas' first marriage with Maria (Anna) of Vitebsk, were brought up in pagan culture. Uliana's son Jogaila, and not Algirdas' eldest son Andrei of Polotsk, inherited the throne and became the grand duke of Lithuania in 1377. Uliana, as dowager grand duchess, appeared in national politics and was involved in the Lithuanian Civil War, as well as an unsuccessful attempt to wed Jogaila with Sophia, daughter of Dmitry Donskoy, and convert him to Eastern Orthodoxy. The plans failed when Jogaila converted to Roman Catholicism, married Jadwiga of Poland, and was crowned as the king of Poland (jure uxoris) in 1386.

== See also ==
- Family of Algirdas – family of Uliana and Algirdas
