= Hedwig Jagiellon =

Hedwig or Jadwiga Jagiellon(ka) may refer to:

- Hedwig Jagiellon (1408–1431), daughter of Jogaila, King of Poland and Grand Duke of Lithuania, and Anna of Celje
- Hedwig Jagiellon (1457–1502), daughter of King Casimir IV Jagiellon of Poland and Archduchess Elisabeth of Austria; wife of Duke George of Bavaria in Landshut
- Hedwig Jagiellon (1513–1573), daughter of Sigismund I the Old of Poland and Hungarian princess Barbara Zápolya; wife of Joachim II Hector, Elector of Brandenburg
