= Dmitry of Bryansk =

Lithuanian prince (died 1399)

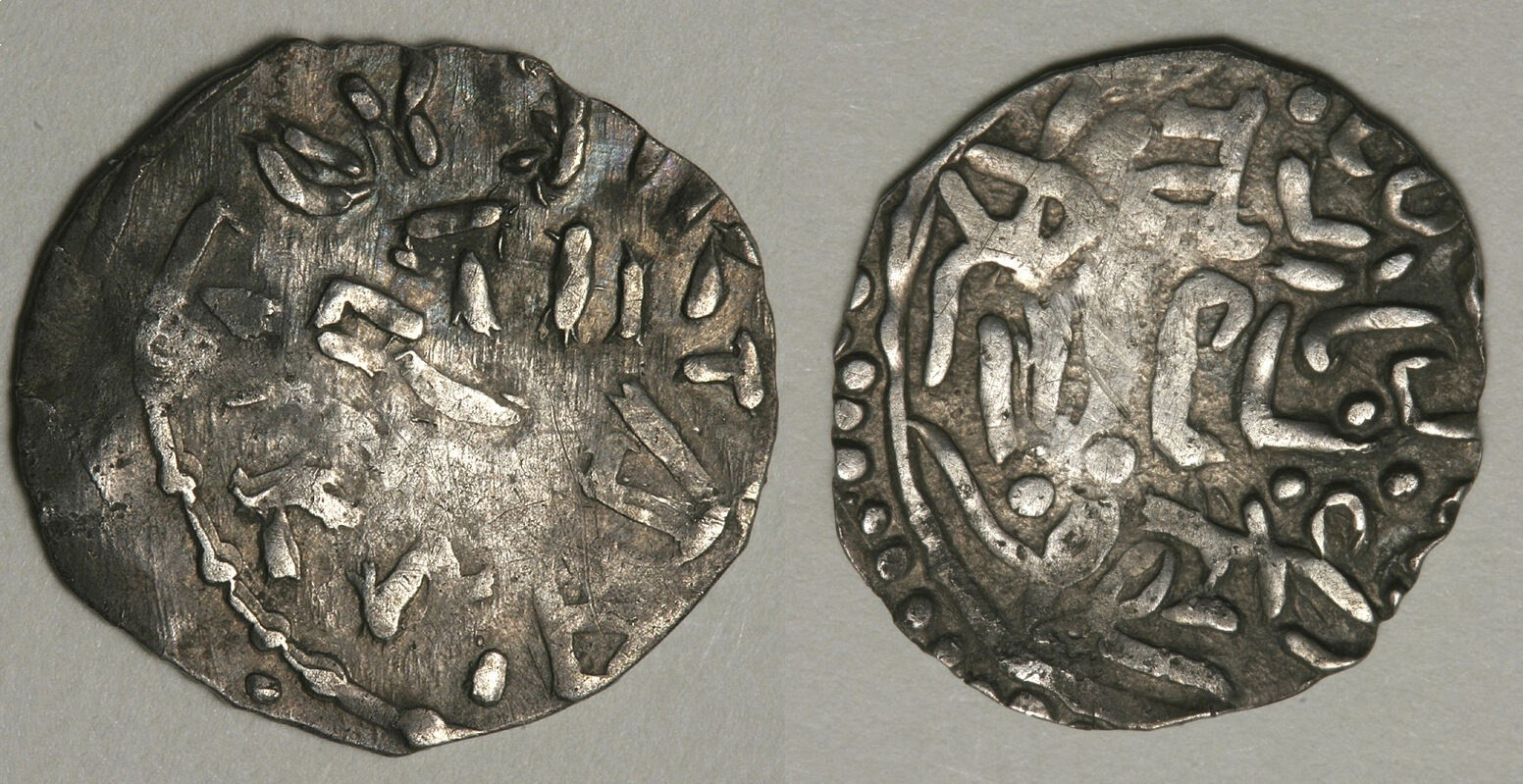
Lithuanian coin of Dmitry of Bryansk, minted between 1372–1376 at the Duchy of Bryansk (then part of the Grand Duchy of Lithuania)

Dmitry of Bryansk or Dmitry the Elder (Lithuanian: Dmitrijus Algirdaitis Brianskietis, Polish: Dymitr Olgierdowicz, died on 12 August 1399 in the Battle of the Vorskla River) was the Lithuanian prince of Bryansk from 1356 to 1379 and from 1388 to 1399. Dmitry was the second eldest son of Algirdas, the grand duke of Lithuania, and his first wife.

== Life ==
In 1356, Algird took the region of Bryansk, which included Trubetsk and Starodub, from the Principality of Smolensk and granted it to his son Dmitry to govern. The territory was in the far northeast from the heartlands of the Grand Duchy of Lithuania and bordered the Principality of Moscow. In 1370, Dmitry Donskoy, the grand prince of Moscow, unsuccessfully attempted to conquer the territory. In 1372, Dmitry witnessed the Treaty of Lyubutsk between Algird and Dmitry Donskoi.

After his father's death in 1377, Dmitry supported his elder brother, Andrei of Polotsk against their younger half-brother Jogaila, who became the grand duke of Lithuania. Andrei, believing that he was the rightful heir to the throne, organized a coalition against Jogaila, which included Polotsk, Pskov, the Livonian Order, and Moscow. Dmitry took a more passive role in the coalition: he did not wage a direct war against Lithuania and did not defend his domain when it was attacked by Moscow's army in 1379. Dmitry and his family followed the retreating Russian army into Moscow where Dmitry Donskoi granted him Pereslavl-Zalessky. In 1380, Dmitry led a Russian banner in the Battle of Kulikovo against the Golden Horde. Russian chronicles praise his and his brother's tactical skills.

After 1380, Dmitry is mentioned in written sources only twice. After his brother Andrei was captured by Skirgaila's forces and imprisoned in Poland, Dmitry reconciled with Jogaila, now King of Poland, in 1388. He returned to his former domain in Bryansk. Dmitry died in 1399 in the Battle of the Vorskla River against the Golden Horde.

Dmitry's son, Michał Trubetsky is considered to be the ancestor of the Trubetskoy family.

Dmitry is also presumed to be the father of Alexandra Drucka, which means he purposefully became father-in-law to his younger half-brother Jagiełło, as Alexandra's daughter was Jagiełło's fourth wife Sophia of Halshany. Through Sophia, Dmitry would have been an ancestor to all the Jagiellonian monarchs after Jagiełło.
