= Karigaila =

Lithuanian noble (died 1390)

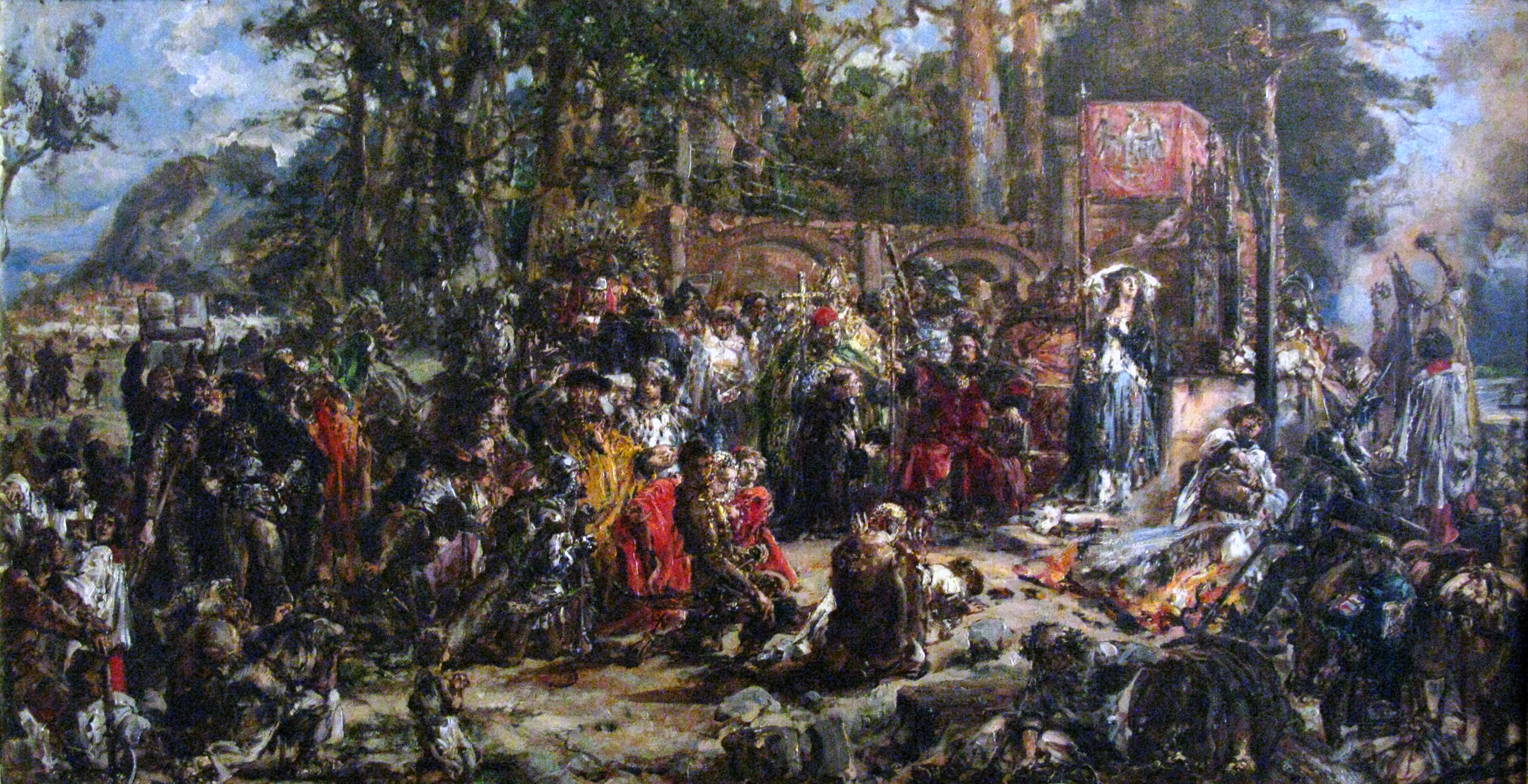
The Baptism of Lithuania by Jan Matejko, 1889

Karigaila (Polish: Korygiełło, died on 16 September 1390 in Vilnius) was the son of Lithuanian grand duke Algirdas by his second wife Uliana of Tver. He ruled the Principality of Mstislavl.

== Life ==
He was the son of Grand Duke Algirdas by his second wife Uliana of Tver. He is sometimes mistaken for his brother Constantine, who was the founder of the House of Czartoryski.

He became the ruler of Mstislavl after he captured it from the Principality of Smolensk.

After his older brother Jogaila signed the Union of Krewo, Karigaila was baptized as Casimir in Kraków in March 1386. He then left Poland for the eastern part of the Grand Duchy of Lithuania in order to subdue his half-brother Andrei of Polotsk, who had renewed his struggle for power against Jogaila. On 29 April 1386, he and his other brother Skirgaila soundly defeated Sviatoslav II of Smolensk, who had allied himself with Andrei and attacked Mstislav at the Battle of the Vekhra River.

During the Lithuanian Civil War of 1389–1392, Karigaila commanded the defence of the Crooked Castle in Vilnius. The castle fell and he was killed on 16 September 1390. His brother Jogaila, now king of Poland, charged that Karigaila was taken captive and executed by decapitation by the Teutonic Knights; the Knights denied this and claimed that Karigaila was killed during the battle. Karigaila was buried at Vilnius Cathedral.

== See also ==
- House of Algirdas – family tree of Karigaila

== Sources ==
- "Корыгелло, Василий-Казмир" . Brockhaus and Efron Encyclopedic Dictionary (in Russian). 1906.
