= Andrei of Polotsk =

14th-century Lithuanian prince

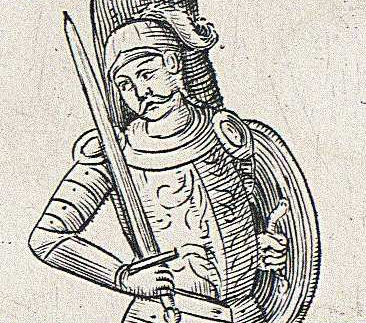
- Born: 1325
- Died: 1399 (aged 73–74)
- Issue: Michail; Semion; Ivan; Fiodor
- Dynasty: Gediminids
- Father: Algirdas, Grand Duke of Lithuania
- Mother: Maria of Vitebsk

Andrei of Polotsk (Lithuanian: Andrius Algirdaitis; Belarusian: Андрэй Альгердавіч; Polish: Andrzej Olgierdowic; c. 1325 – 12 August 1399) was the eldest son of Algirdas, Grand Duke of Lithuania, and his first wife Maria of Vitebsk. He was the Prince of Pskov (through his deputy Yuri, 1342–1348) and Polotsk (1342–1387). As the eldest son of the Grand Duke, Andrei claimed his right to the throne after his father's death in 1377. Algirdas left Jogaila, his eldest son with his second wife Uliana of Tver, as the rightful heir. Andrei's rivalry with Jogaila, Grand Duke of Lithuania and later King of Poland, eventually led to his demise.

== Prince of Pskov and Polotsk ==
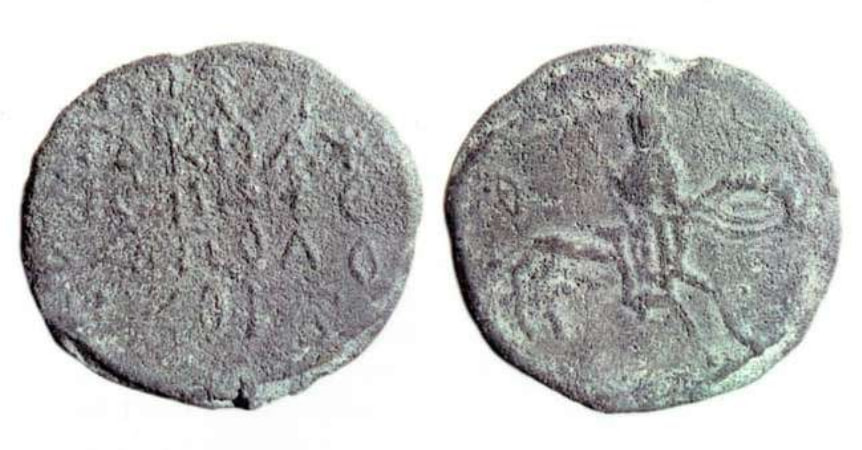
Molivdovul of Andrei of Polotsk from Vialiki Aziareck

In 1342, Andrei joined his father Algirdas and uncle Kęstutis in a war against the Livonian Order to help the Pskov Republic. The Republic asked him to stay as a prince of Pskov so that his presence would guarantee continuous support from Algirdas. Andrei accepted and was baptized in Orthodox rite (his pagan name is unknown). (Note: The Bychowiec Chronicle records his pagan name as Vingolt, which Maciej Stryjkowski rendered as Vigunt. However, that is the name of another son of Algirdas.) However, he stayed there for a very short time and returned to Lithuania. Reasons are not entirely clear, but historians speculate it was related to death of his great-uncle Vainius, Duke of Polotsk. Polotsk was vital to Lithuanian interests as it was situated between Lithuania and the Livonian Order. Andrei became the Prince of Polotsk and helped defend Lithuania against Livonian attacks. In Pskov, Andrei left his deputy, otherwise unknown Yuri. Lithuanian historian Alvydas Nikžentaitis speculated that this Yuri could have been a grandson of Gediminas.

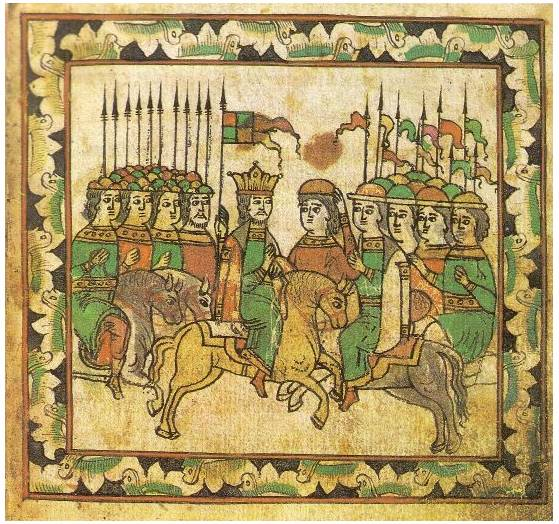
Background of the Kulikovo Battle. Russian army meets its allies - Princes Andrey Olgerdovich of Polotsk and Dmitri Olgerdovich of Bryansk

Yuri remained in Pskov until 1348 when Teutonic Knights organized a large attack against Lithuania (see Battle of Strėva). Pskov's army was helping Novgorod against Sweden when Livonian Order attacked a Pskovian fortress at Izborsk. Yuri died in the attack. Because Lithuanians were unable to defend Pskov, the city refused to accept another deputy from the Grand Duchy of Lithuania. Andrei responded with repressions: all merchants from Pskov were arrested and their goods confiscated. The friendly relationship between Pskov and Lithuania was terminated. Andrei remained as Prince of Polotsk for the next three decades.

== Struggle against Jogaila ==
After the death of Algirdas in 1377, Andrei, as the eldest son, rivaled his half-brother Jogaila, whom Algirdas had designated as his heir. Jogaila at the time enjoyed strong support from his uncle Kęstutis. Andrei organized an anti-Lithuanian coalition with Polotsk, Grand Duchy of Moscow, and the Livonian Order. In 1379, Moscow's army attacked eastern territories of the Grand Duchy; Moscow and Lithuania were at peace since the Treaty of Lyubutsk in 1372. Andrei's brother Dymitr I Starszy did not defend the Principality of Trubetsk and Starodub. However, the Russian army did not remain in taken territories and retreated back to Moscow; Andrei and Dymitr followed it. Jogaila signed a ten-year truce with the Teutonic Knights on September 29, 1379 and a truce with the Livonian Order on February 27, 1380, thus fracturing the coalition. He further enlisted Mamai, a powerful warlord of the Golden Horde, and Oleg II of Ryazan as his allies against Andrei. In 1380, Andrei and Dymitr fought for Moscow in the Battle of Kulikovo against the Tatars. The Tatars were badly defeated when Jogaila's army did not arrive to the battlefield on time.

In 1381, Jogaila attempted to install his loyal brother Skirgaila in Polotsk, Andrei's former domain. As Skirgaila was laying a siege on the rebellious city, Kęstutis and his son Vytautas took the opportunity to start the Lithuanian Civil War against Jogaila and remove him from the throne. Polotsk voluntarily surrendered to Kęstutis, who reinstated Andrei. Sources do not mention him in 1381–1385. Possibly he was waiting in Polotsk for the feud between Jogaila and Kęstutis to be sorted out. Kęstutis died, but Jogaila and Vytautas reconciled in 1384. On October 10, 1385, Andrei signed a treaty with the Livonian Order in which he surrendered to the Order in exchange for protection against Vytautas and other enemies. According to the treaty, Andrei became Order's vassal and received Polotsk as a feudal estate. When Jogaila traveled to Poland to discuss the Union of Krewo, Andrei took the opportunity to renew his war against Lithuania. In 1386, he attacked territories south east of Polotsk. His cause was helped by the Livonian Order, which attacked Duchy of Lithuania, and by Sviatoslav II of Smolensk, who attacked Mstsislaw, taken from the Principality of Smolensk by Algirdas. However, Sviatoslav suffered a great defeat in the Battle of the Vikhra River and the Principality of Smolensk became a vassal of Lithuania.

== Capture and release ==
The Lithuanian army, led by Skirgaila, attacked Polotsk in 1387. The Livonian Order did not defend it, and the city soon surrendered. Andrei was captured; his son Simeon died in the fighting and another son, Ivan, escaped to Pskov, where he was mentioned as a prince in 1389. Andrei was imprisoned in Poland for seven years. He was released in 1394 by request of Vytautas. After the release Andrei moved to Pskov, where he attempted to negotiate a truce between Pskov and Novgorod. After this event he was mentioned only once – as one of the prominent figures, who perished in the Battle of the Vorskla River in 1399.
