= Algirdas =

Grand Duke of Lithuania from 1345 to 1377

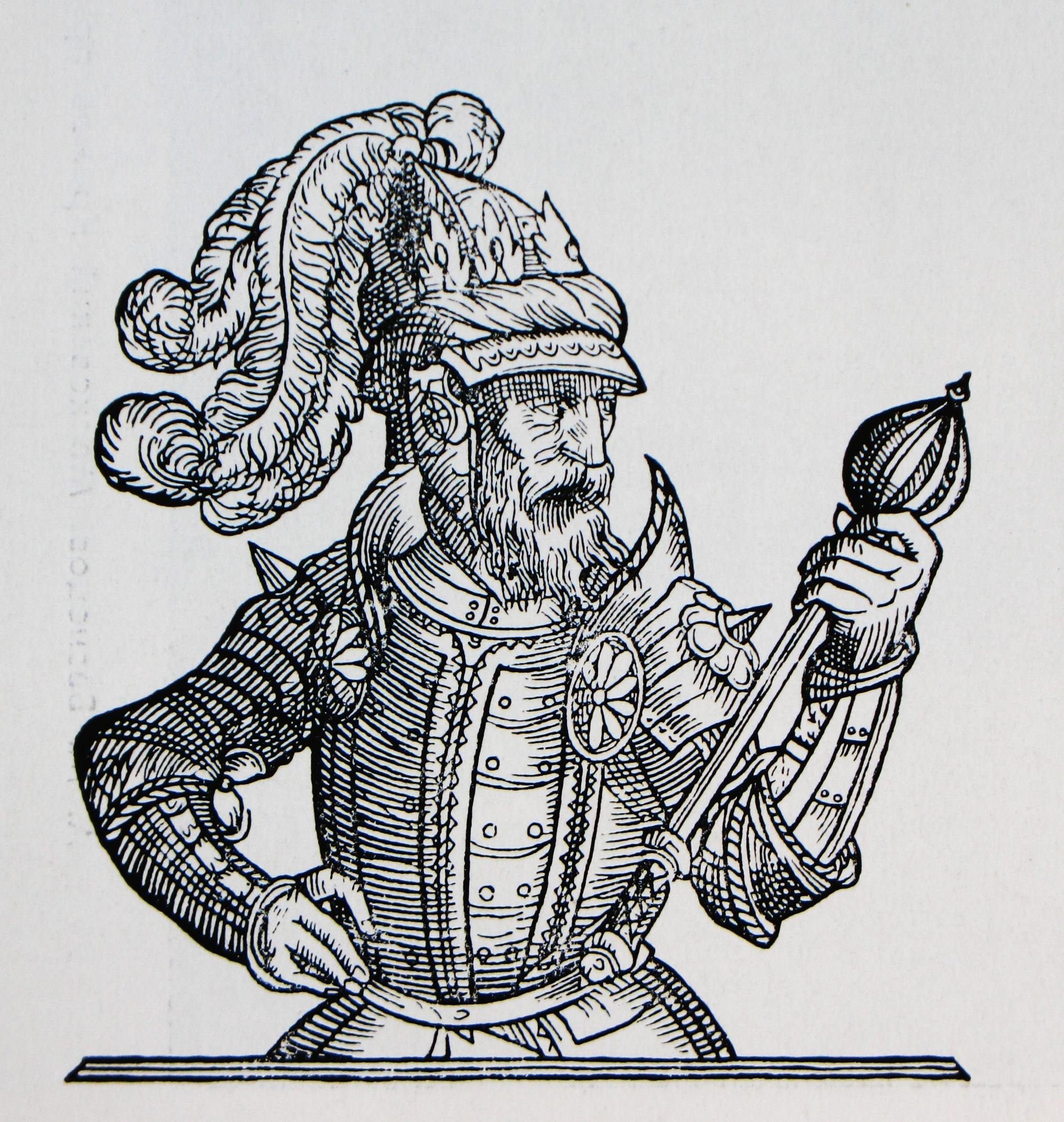
- Fragment from medal by Juozas Kalinauskas

Grand Duke of Lithuania
- Reign: 1345–1377
- Predecessor: Jaunutis
- Successor: Jogaila
- Co-ruler: Kęstutis

Duke of Zaslawye
- Reign: c. 1320–1345
- Successor: Jaunutis

Prince of Vitebsk
- Reign: 1318–1377
- Predecessor: Vasilko Briachislavich
- Successor: Uliana Alexandrovna of Tver
- Born: c. 1296
- Died: Late May 1377 possibly Maišiagala
- Spouse: Maria or Anna of Vitebsk; Uliana Alexandrovna of Tver
- Issue more...: Dmitry of Bryansk; Andrei of Polotsk; Vladimir Olgerdovich; Jogaila; Skirgaila; Švitrigaila
- Dynasty: Gediminid
- Father: Gediminas
- Mother: Vida
- Religion: Lithuanian polytheism

Algirdas (Note: Lithuanian pronunciation: [ˈɐlʲˑgʲɪrd̪ɐs]; in other languages also known as Belarusian: Альгерд, romanized: Alhierd; Ukrainian: Ольге́рд, О́льґерд, romanized: Olherd, Olgerd, Polish: Olgierd) (c. 1296 – May 1377) was Grand Duke of Lithuania from 1345 to 1377. With the help of his brother Kęstutis (who defended the western border of the Duchy), he created an empire stretching from the present Baltic states to the Black Sea and to within 80 kilometres (50 miles) of Moscow.

== Early life and rise to power ==
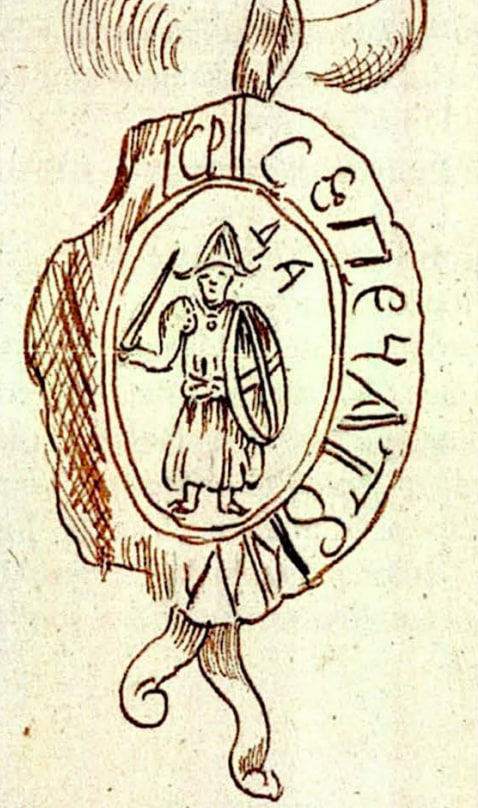
Drawing of Grand Duke Algirdas's seal from the 1366 treaty

Algirdas was one of the seven sons of Grand Duke Gediminas. Before his death in 1341, Gediminas divided his domain, leaving his youngest son Jaunutis in possession of the capital, Vilnius. With the aid of his brother Kęstutis, Algirdas drove out the incompetent Jaunutis and declared himself Grand Duke in 1345. He devoted the next thirty-two years to the development and expansion of the Grand Duchy of Lithuania. He and Kęstutis appeared to rule jointly as co-rulers.

After becoming the ruler of Lithuania, Algirdas was titled the King of Lithuania (Latin: rex Letwinorum) in the Livonian Chronicles instead of the terms knyaz (English: prince, duke) or velikiy knyaz (grand prince).

Two factors are thought to have contributed to this result: the political sagacity of Algirdas and the devotion of Kęstutis. The division of their dominions is illustrated by the fact that Algirdas appears almost exclusively in East Slavic sources, while Western chronicles primarily describe Kęstutis. Lithuania was surrounded by enemies. The Teutonic Order in the northwest and the Golden Horde in the southeast sought Lithuanian territory, while Poland to the west and the Moscow principality to the east were generally hostile competitors.

== Expansion of Lithuania ==
Algirdas held his own, also acquiring influence and territory at the expense of the Moscow principality and the Golden Horde and extending the borders of the Grand Duchy of Lithuania to the Black Sea. His principal efforts were directed toward securing the East Slavic lands which were part of the former Kievan Rus'. Although Algirdas engineered the election of his son Andrius as Prince of Pskov and a powerful minority of Novgorod Republic citizens supported him against the Moscow principality, his rule in both commercial centres was (at best) precarious.

Algirdas occupied the important principalities of Smolensk and Bryansk. Although his relationship with the grand dukes of Moscow principality was generally friendly (demonstrated by his marriages to two Orthodox Russian princesses), he besieged Moscow in 1368 and 1370 during the Lithuanian–Muscovite War (1368–1372). An important feat by Algirdas was his victory over the Tatars in the Battle of Blue Waters at the Southern Bug in 1362, which resulted in the breakup of the Kipchaks and compelled the khan to establish his headquarters in the Crimea.

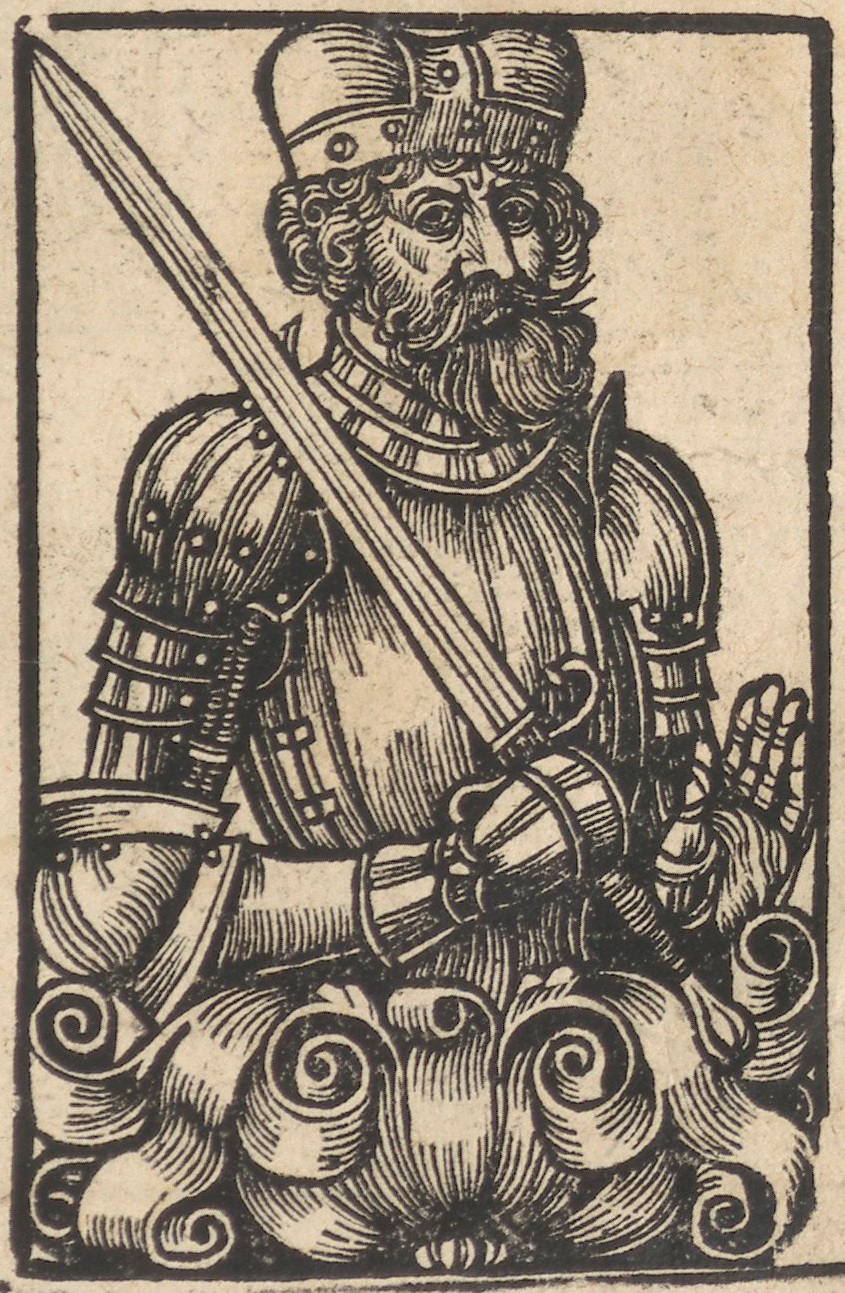
Algirdas with Gediminas' Cap, painted in 1578

In a 1371 letter to Philotheus Kokkinos, the Ecumenical Patriarch of Constantinople, Algirdas titled himself as a Lithuanian King, demanded a separate metropolitan bishop (from Moscow) for Kyiv, Smolensk, Tver, Little Russia, Novosil, and Nizhny Novgorod, and denied Muscovite complaints that he attacked Moscow without a reason.

== Death and succession ==
Algirdas died in May 1377. At the beginning of the year, his named heir was the youngest son he had by his first wife, Prince Fiodor. However, Algirdas apparently changed his mind briefly before his death and he installed as his new Crown Prince one of his sons from the second marriage, Jogaila, who ultimately inherited the throne. Jogaila was a son of Algirdas by his second wife, Uliana, though it's debated whether he was the eldest one.

Fiodor presumably tried to take the position of the Grand Duke in 1381 during coup against his younger half-brother, however, it was their uncle Kęstutis who took the seat at that time. Jogaila ultimately reclaimed his title in 1382 and Fiodor recognized him as sovereign by 1386, effectively withdrawing his own claim.

== Religion ==
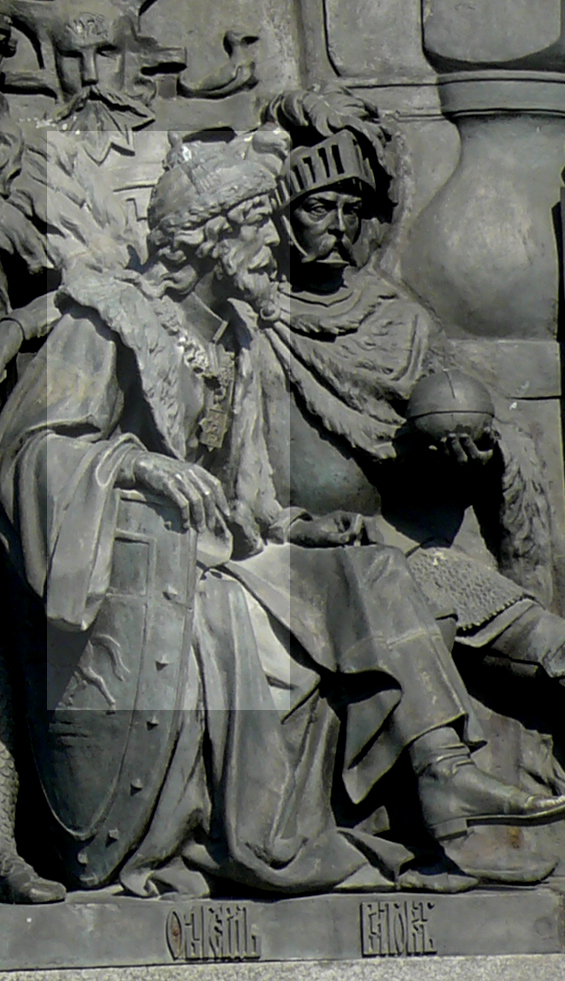
Algirdas (left) on the Millennium of Russia monument in Veliky Novgorod

According to modern historians, "For Gediminas and Algirdas, retention of paganism provided a useful diplomatic tool and weapon... that allowed them to use promises of conversion as a means of preserving their power and independence". Hermann von Wartberge and Jan Długosz described Algirdas as a pagan until his death in 1377. Contemporary Byzantine accounts support the Western sources; future Patriarch Nilus described Algirdas as a "fire-worshipping prince" and another patriarch, Philotheus, excommunicated all Ruthenian noblemen who helped the "impious" Algirdas. His pagan beliefs were also mentioned in 14th-century Byzantine historian Nicephorus Gregoras' accounts.

After his death, Algirdas was burned on a ceremonial pyre with 18 horses and many of his possessions in a forest near Maišiagala, probably in the Kukaveitis forest shrine located at 54°55′42″N 25°01′04″E. His alleged burial site has undergone archaeological research since 2009. Algirdas' descendants include the Trubetzkoy, Czartoryski and Sanguszko families.

Although Algirdas was said to have ordered the death of Anthony, John, and Eustathius of Vilnius, who were later glorified as martyrs of the Russian Orthodox Church, the 16th-century Bychowiec Chronicle and 17th-century Hustynska Chronicle maintain that he converted to Orthodox Christianity some time before his marriage to Maria of Vitebsk in 1318. Several Orthodox churches were built in Vilnius during his reign, but later assertions about his baptism are uncorroborated by contemporary sources. Despite contemporary accounts and modern studies, however, some Russian historians (such as Batyushkov) claim that Algirdas was an Orthodox ruler. The Kiev Monastery of the Caves' commemorative book, underwritten by Algirdas' descendants, recorded his baptismal name as Demetrius during the 1460s. Algirdas married Uliana of Tver by 1350.

Following Wojciech Wijuk Kojałowicz and Macarius I, Volodymyr Antonovych writes that Algirdas took monastic vows several days before his death and was interred at the Cathedral of the Theotokos in Vilnius under the monastic name Alexius.

== Private life ==
With his first wife, Anna or Maria of Vitebsk, Algirdas had the following children:

1. Andrei of Polotsk (1325 – 12 August 1399 in the Battle of the Vorskla River), Prince of Polotsk (1342–1387), Pskov (1342–1348)
2. Dmitry of Bryansk (1327 – 12 August 1399 in the Battle of the Vorskla River), Duke of Bryansk (1356–1379 and 1388–1399)
3. Constantine (died before 30 October 1390), Prince of Chortoryisk. According to J. Tęgowski, he may be son of Karijotas.
4. Vladimir Olgerdovich (died after October 1398), Grand Prince of Kiev (1362–1394), Kapyl, Slutsk. Ancestor of Olelkovich and Belsky families.
5. Fiodor (Theodore; died in 1399), Prince of Rylsk (1370–1399), Ratnie (1387–1394) and Bryansk (1393). Fiodor was also designated heir of his father, before being replaced in that role by Jogaila.
6. Fiedora, wife of Sviatoslav of Karachev
7. Agrypina (baptized Mary; died in 1393), wife of Boris of Suzdal

With his second wife, Uliana of Tver, Algirdas had the following children:

1. Jogaila (baptized Władysław; c. 1351/1363 – 1 June 1434), chosen heir of his father, became Grand Duke of Lithuania (1377–1381) and eventually King of Poland (1386–1434).
2. Skirgaila (baptized Ivan; c. 1354 – 11 January 1397 in Kiev), Duke of Trakai (1382–1395), Kiev (1395–1397), regent of Lithuania
3. Kaributas (baptized Dmitry; after 1350 – after 1404), Prince of Novhorod-Siverskyi (1386–1392/93)
4. Lengvenis (baptised Simon; died after 19 June 1431), Prince of Mstislavl, regent of Novgorod Republic
5. Karigaila (baptized Casimir; after 1350–1390), Prince of Mstislavl
6. Vygantas (baptized Alexander; after 1350 – 28 June 1392), Prince of Kernavė
7. Švitrigaila (baptized Bolesław; c. 1370 – 10 February 1452 in Lutsk), Grand Duke of Lithuania (1430–1432), Prince of Volhynia (1437–1452)
8. Kenna (baptized Joan; c. 1350 – 27 April 1368), wife of Casimir IV, Duke of Pomerania
9. Helen (after 1350 – 15 September 1438), wife of Vladimir the Bold
10. Maria (born after 1350), wife of Vaidila and David of Gorodets
11. Wilheida (baptized Catherine; after 1350 – after 4 April 1422), wife of John II, Duke of Mecklenburg-Stargard
12. Alexandra (after 1350 – 19 June 1434), wife of Siemowit IV, Duke of Masovia
13. Jadwiga (after 1350 – after 1407), wife of Jan III of Oświęcim

Through his son Vladimir, Algirdas is the fifth great-grandfather of Elizabeth Báthory.

== Assessment ==
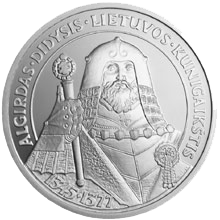
Litas commemorative coin with image of Algirdas

Algirdas balanced himself between the Principality of Moscow and Poland, spoke Lithuanian and Ruthenian (among other languages), and followed the majority of his pagan and Orthodox subjects rather than to alienate them by promoting Roman Catholicism. His son Jogaila ascended the Polish throne, converted to Roman Catholicism and founded the dynasty which ruled Lithuania and Poland for nearly 200 years.

Algirdas is also widely honoured in Belarus as a unifier of modern-day Belarusian lands within one state, a successful military commander and ruler. A monument of him was erected in Vitebsk in 2014 as part of the celebration of the city's 1040th anniversary. For over 20 years, Algirdas was Prince of Vitebsk before becoming Grand Duke of Lithuania.

In December 2022, the National Bank of the Republic of Belarus issued a commemorative coin dedicated to the Battle of Blue Waters with a portrait of Algirdas.

== Popular culture ==
Algirdas features in the 2021 video game Age of Empires II: Definitive Edition in the Dawn of the Dukes campaign, detailing the exploits of himself and his brother Kęstutis.

== See also ==
- Gediminids

== Sources ==
- Nowakowska, Natalia, ed. (2019). Remembering the Jagiellonians. Routledge. ISBN 978-1-138-56239-4.

Algirdas Gediminid dynasty Born: c. 1296 Died: May 1377
| Preceded by Jaunutis | Grand Duke of Lithuania; 1345–1377; With: Kęstutis | Succeeded by Jogaila |
| Preceded by Yaroslav | Prince of Vitebsk; 1345–1377 | Succeeded by Uliana |
