= Principality of Mstislavl =

Former state in present-day Belarus

The Principality of Mstislavl or Mstsislaw was a medieval principality of the Early East Slavs from the 12th century to the 14th century, centered in the town of Mstsislaw in the Mogilev Region of modern eastern Belarus. It was the family seat of the Princes Mstislavsky. In 1377, it was conquered by the Grand Duchy of Lithuania. It became the Mstsislaw Voivodeship of the Polish–Lithuanian Commonwealth until the Partitions of Poland in 1772.
