= Mstsislaw =

Town in Mogilev Region, Belarus

Mstsislaw Мсціслаў (Belarusian) Мстиславль (Russian) Mstislavl
- Town
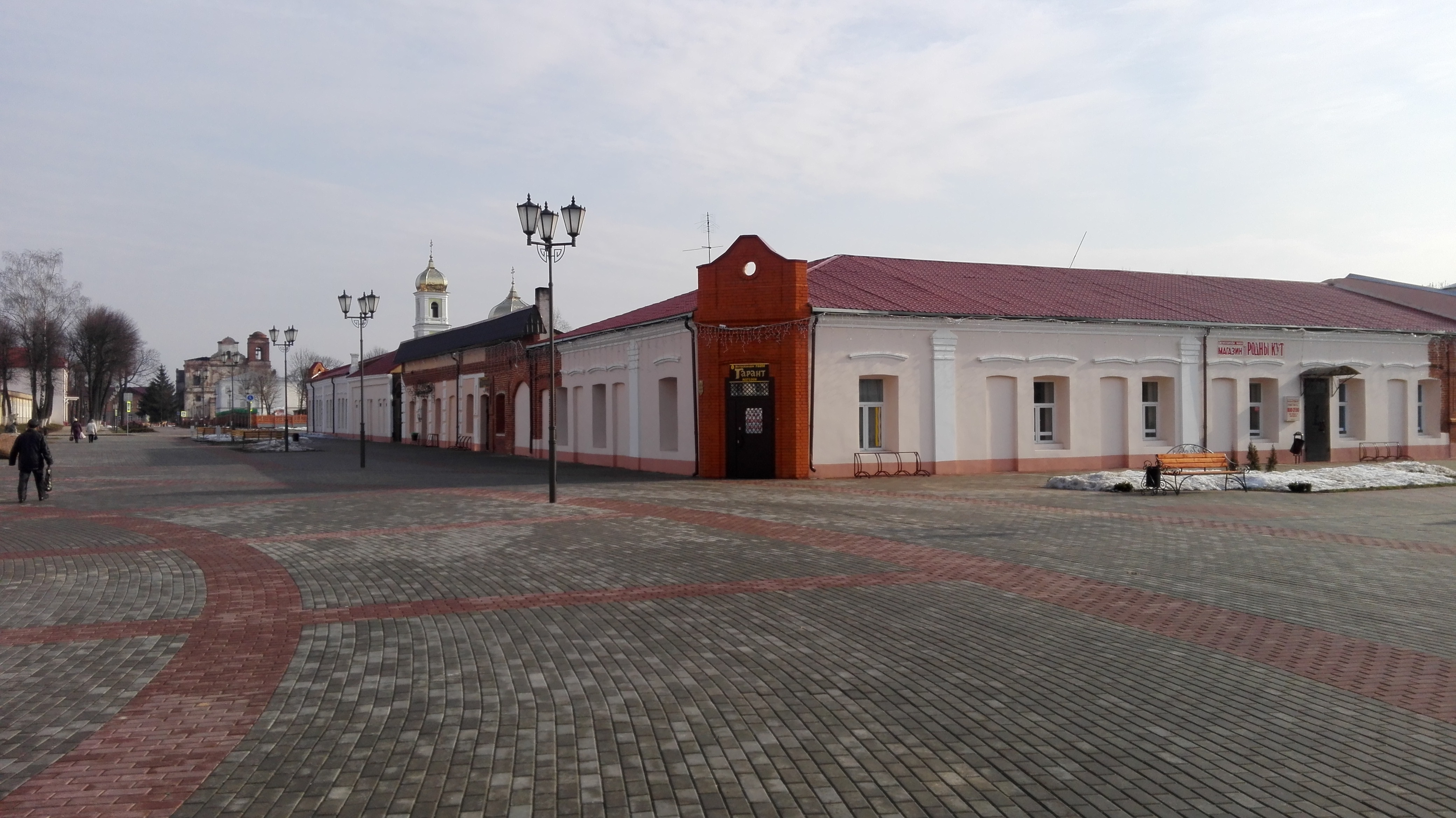
- The trading arcade, 19th century

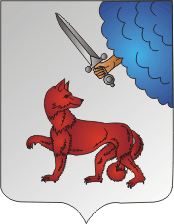
- Flag Coat of arms

- Location within Belarus
- Coordinates: 54°1′N 31°43′E
- Country: Belarus
- Region: Mogilev Region
- District: Mstsislaw District
- First mentioned: 1156

Population (2025)
  - Total: 9,959
- Time zone: UTC+3 (MSK)
- License plate: 6

Mstislaw or Mstislavl (Note: Belarusian: Мсціслаў, romanized: Mscislaŭ, IPA: [msʲt͡sʲiˈsɫau̯]; Russian: Мстиславль, IPA: [msʲtʲɪˈslavlʲ]; Polish: Mścisław, Lithuanian: Mstislavlis; Yiddish: אָמטשיסלאוו, romanized: Omtchislav, Amtchislav.) is a town in Mogilev Region, in eastern Belarus. It serves as the administrative center of Mstsislaw District. In 2009, its population was 10,804. As of 2025, it has a population of 9,959.

== History ==
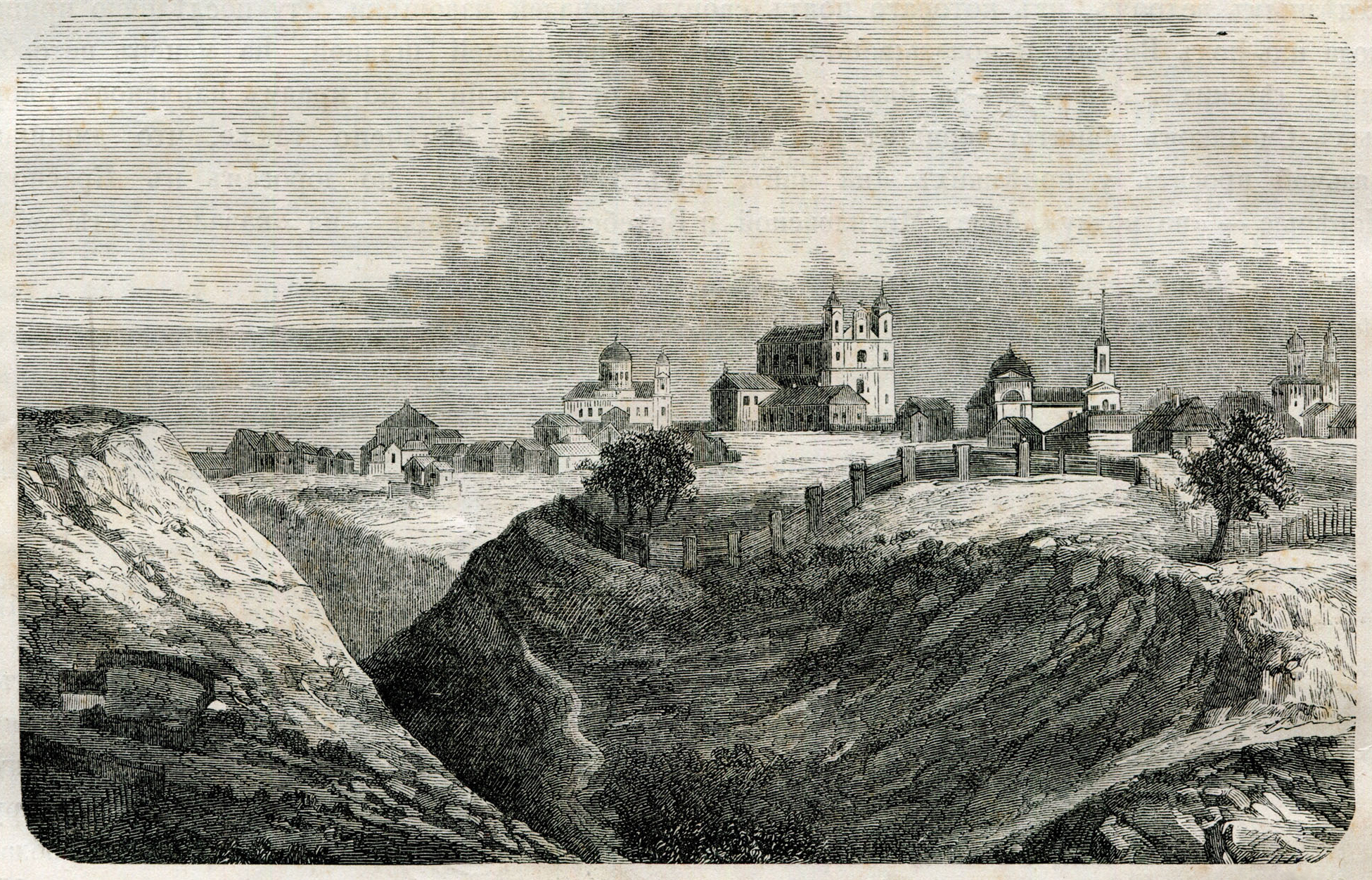
Mstsislaw in the 1870s

Mstislavl was first mentioned in the Ipatiev Chronicle in 1156. It was initially a part of the Principality of Smolensk, but had become the capital of the Principality of Mstislavl by 1180. In the Middle Ages, it was the seat of the Mstislavsky princely family. Pyotr Mstislavets is believed to have been born in Mstislavl.

In 1377, the town joined the Grand Duchy of Lithuania with the free will of its residents. The first Lithuanian duke of Mstislavl was Karigaila, brother of Jogaila. Within the Polish–Lithuanian Commonwealth, it was the capital of the Mścisław Voivodeship, seat of the regional sejmik and court. In 1634, King Władysław IV Vasa granted Magdeburg rights. During the Polish–Russian War of 1654–1667, in 1654, the Russians led by Aleksey Trubetskoy occupied the town and massacred the local population. In 1661, the depopulated and partially destroyed town was recaptured by Polish–Lithuanian forces led by Stefan Czarniecki and Paweł Jan Sapieha. It was afterwards repopulated by Ruthenians, Poles and Lithuanians. The town had several Catholic and Orthodox churches and monasteries of the Carmelites, Basilians and Jesuits. In 1691, a Jesuit school was founded. During the Great Northern War, in 1708 the Swedish occupiers plundered the town, and in 1717 the Russian occupiers deported part of the population to Smolensk claiming they were "fugitive subjects of the Tsar".

It was annexed by Russia in the Partitions of Poland in 1772.

Jewish people had a historic presence in the town. In 1939, there were 2,067 Jewish people living in Mstislavl, representing almost 20% of the local population. The German army occupied the town in July 1941. In early October, they killed 30 elderly Jewish residents. On October 15, 1941, together with the local police, they murdered between 850 and 1,300 Jewish residents.

The town is the birthplace of Jewish historian and writer Simon Dubnow, Jewish statesman and Communist politician Yakov Chubin, and expressionist artist Abraham A. Manievich, among others.

== Sights ==
Buildings of historic interest in the town include the Carmelite church (1637, renovated 1746–50) and the Jesuit cathedral (1640, renovated 1730–38, turned into an Orthodox cathedral in 1842).

== Notable natives ==
- Oleg Trusov - Belarusian archaeologist, Chairman of the Francysk Skaryna Belarusian Language Society. He holds a PhD in history and has authored several monographs and over 150 scholarly papers on archeology and the history of architecture.
- Mikhail Tkachev - Belarusian historian, archaeologist, local history expert, and heraldist. Studied the defensive architecture of the Grand Duchy of Lithuania. He traced the genesis, evolution, and development stages of castles and fortifications in populated areas, as well as the defense organization of Belarusian cities.
- Vladilen Kaler - Belarusian scientist specializing in biochemistry. He conducted research on chlorophyll biosynthesis and photosynthesis using mathematical modeling of biochemical and biophysical processes in plants. He is the author of over 160 scientific publications and monographs.
- Larisa Zhunina - A scientist specializing in the chemical engineering of silicate and refractory non-metallic materials. She developed new types of glass and glass-ceramics with specialized properties. She has authored over 250 publications and approximately 20 patents.
- Izrail Basov - Belarusian painter and graphic artist. He painted lyrical, urban, and industrial landscapes, still lifes, portraits, and thematic paintings. He participated in national, all-Union, foreign, and international exhibitions.
- Abraham Anshelovich Manevich - Russian (present-day Belarus), Ukrainian, Jewish, and American modernist artist. He painted in the style of the Munich-Viennese modernist movement. In 1913, a very successful exhibition of Manevich's works was held at a Paris gallery. He was quite well known in the United States.
- Vladimir Sournin - Chess player of the 19th and 20th centuries, spent most of his career in the US.

== Gallery ==
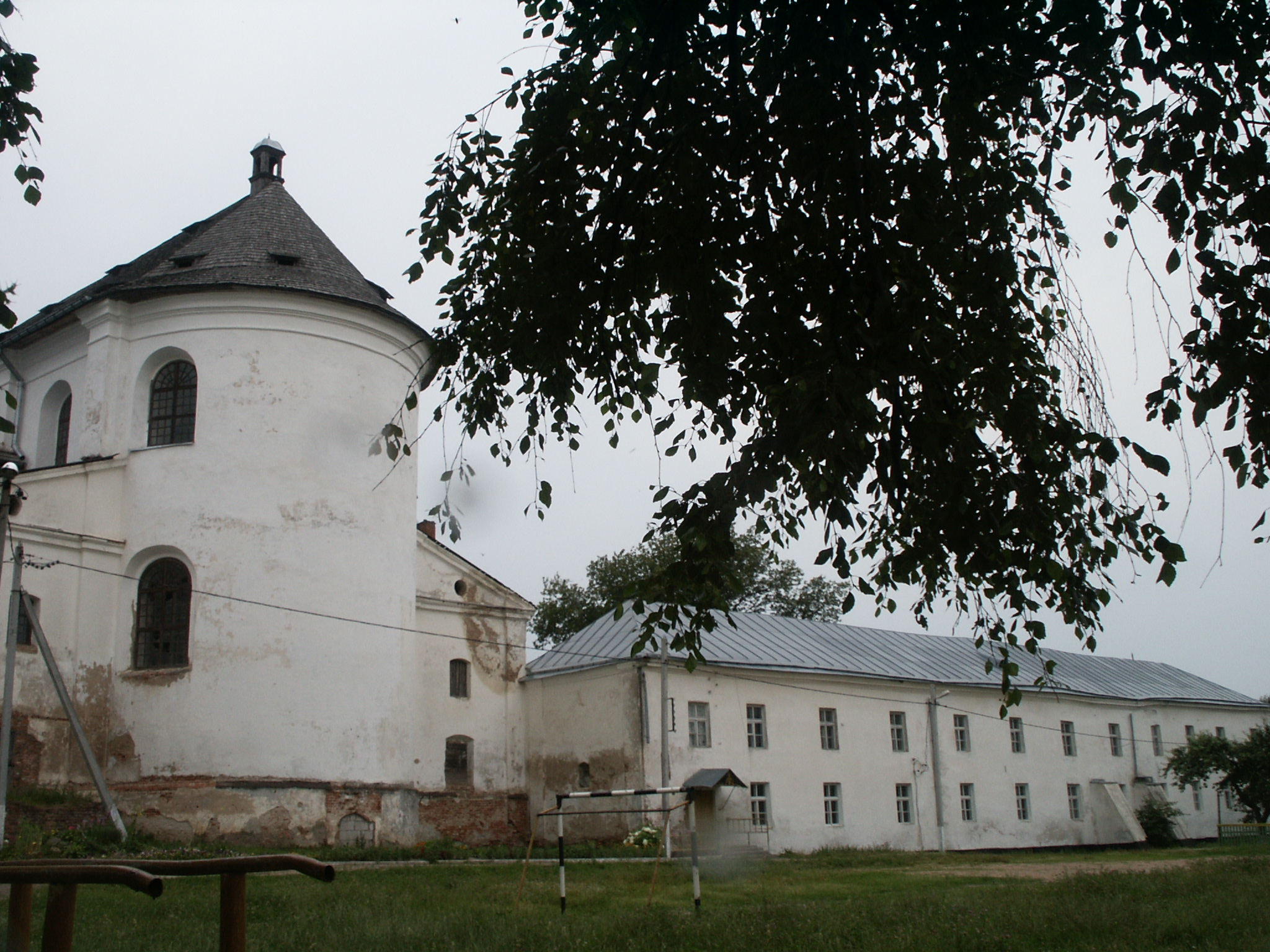
Jesuit Collegium building, from the 17th century

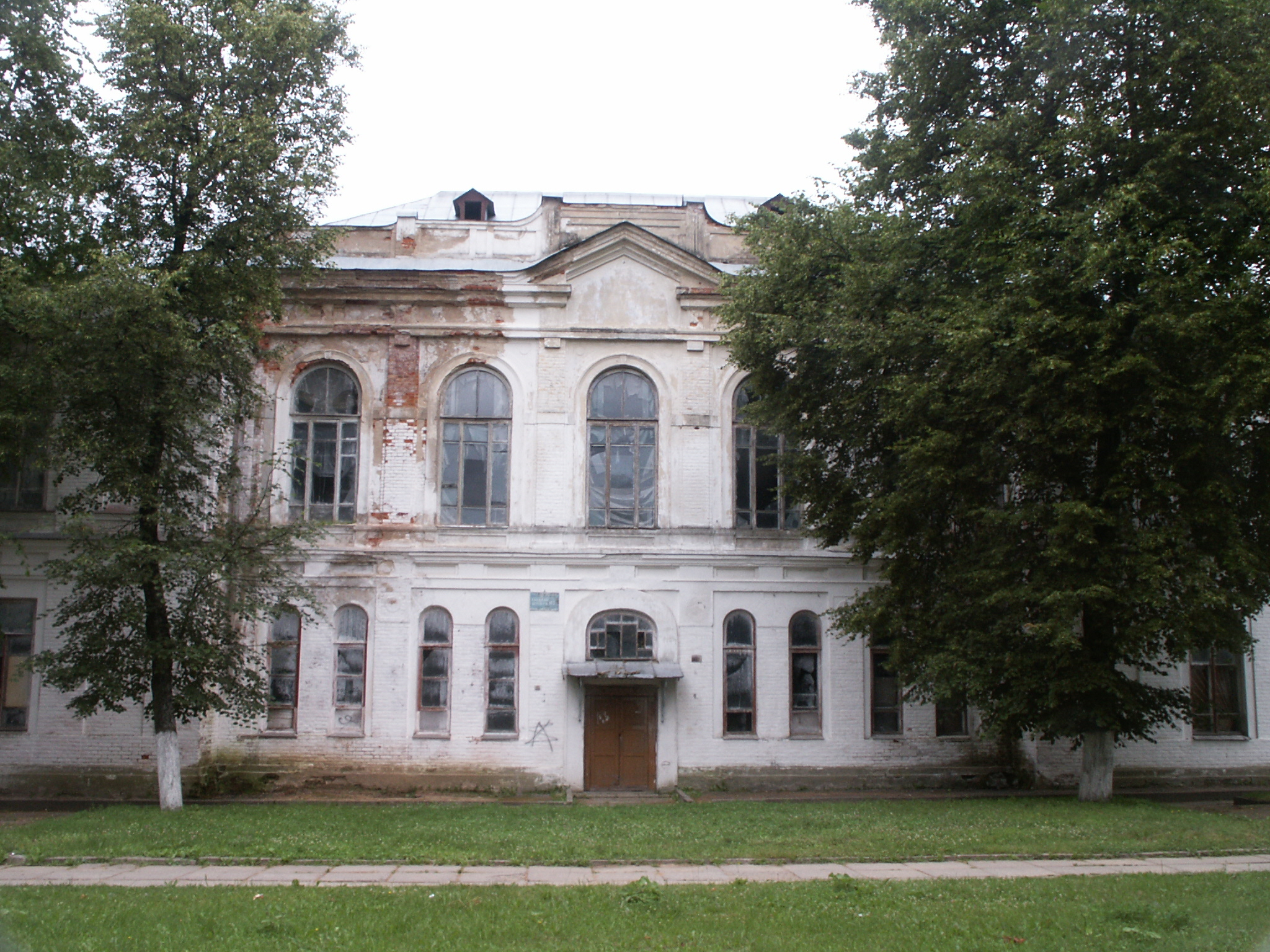
Mstislaw Male Gymnasium, from the beginning of the 19th century

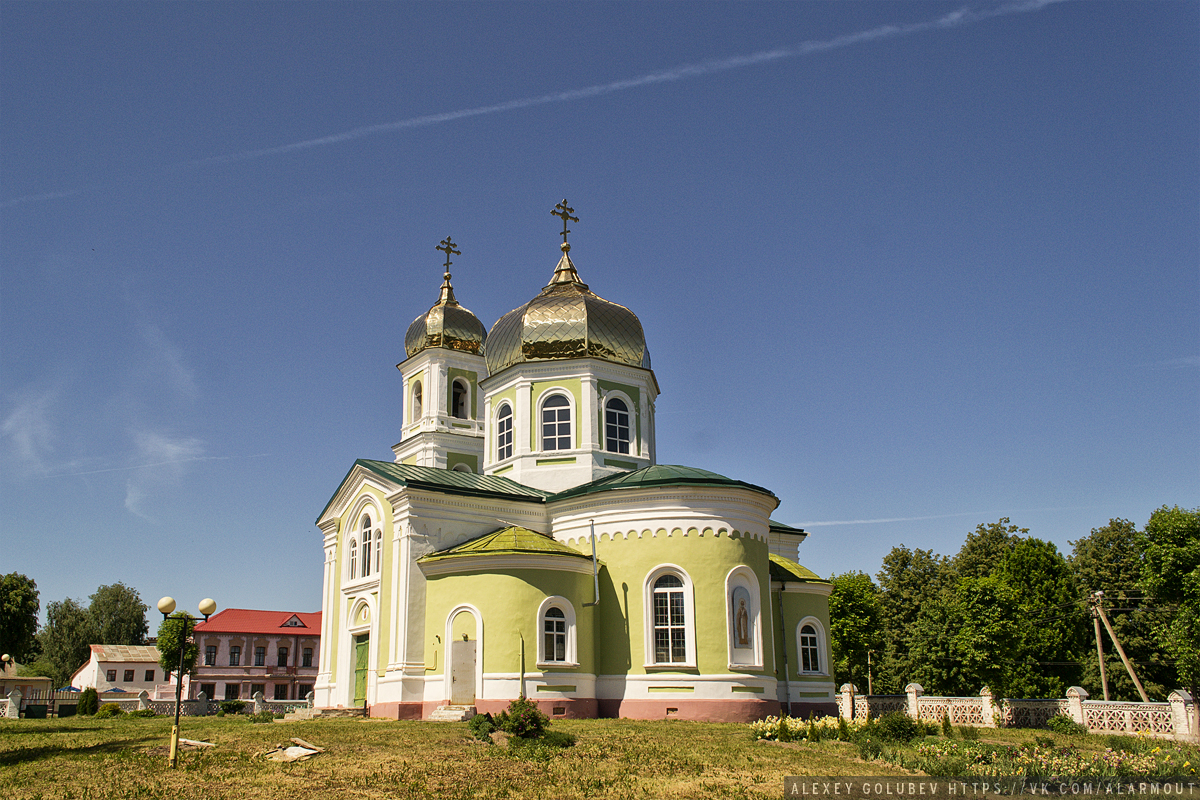
Alexander Nevsky Orthodox Cathedral, built in the 19th century on the foundation of an earlier Catholic Cathedral

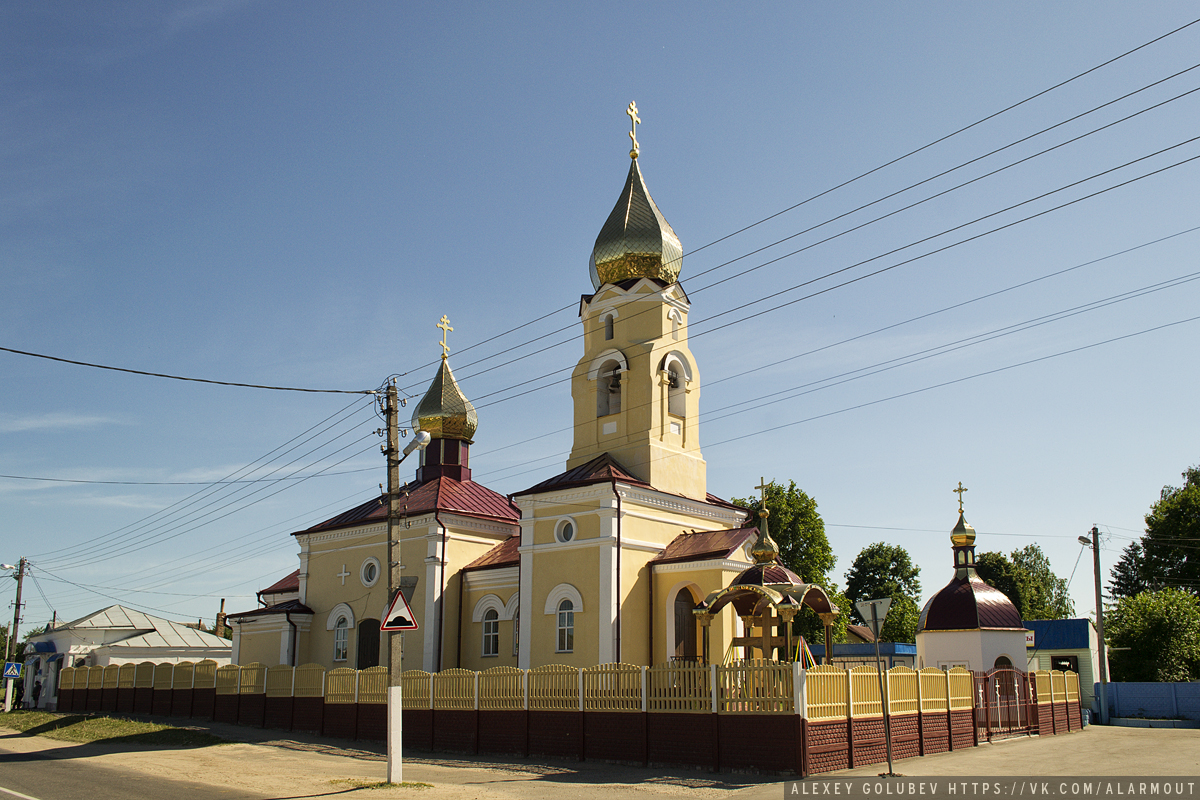
Orthodox Church

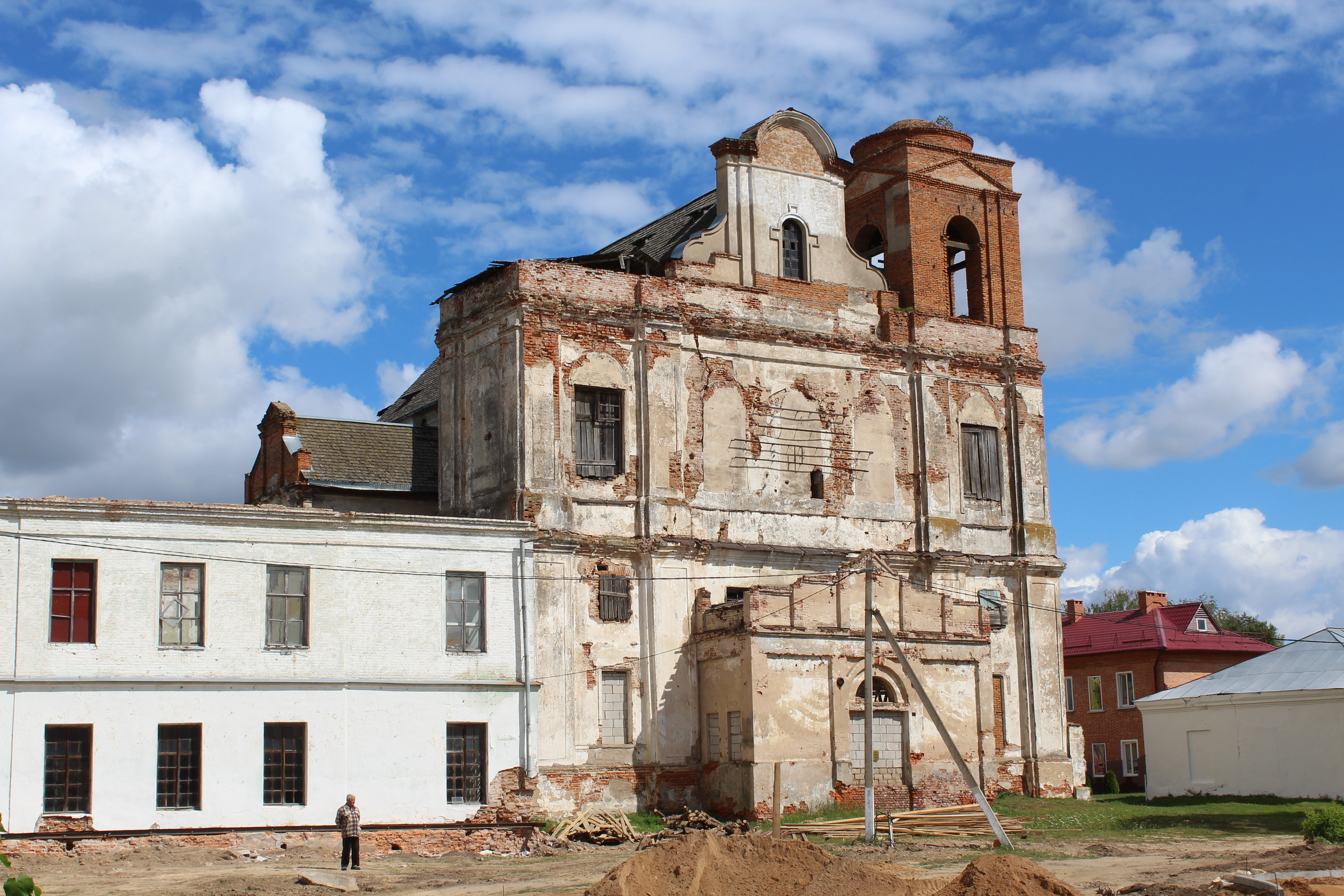
Ruins of the Church of Saint Michael the Archangel

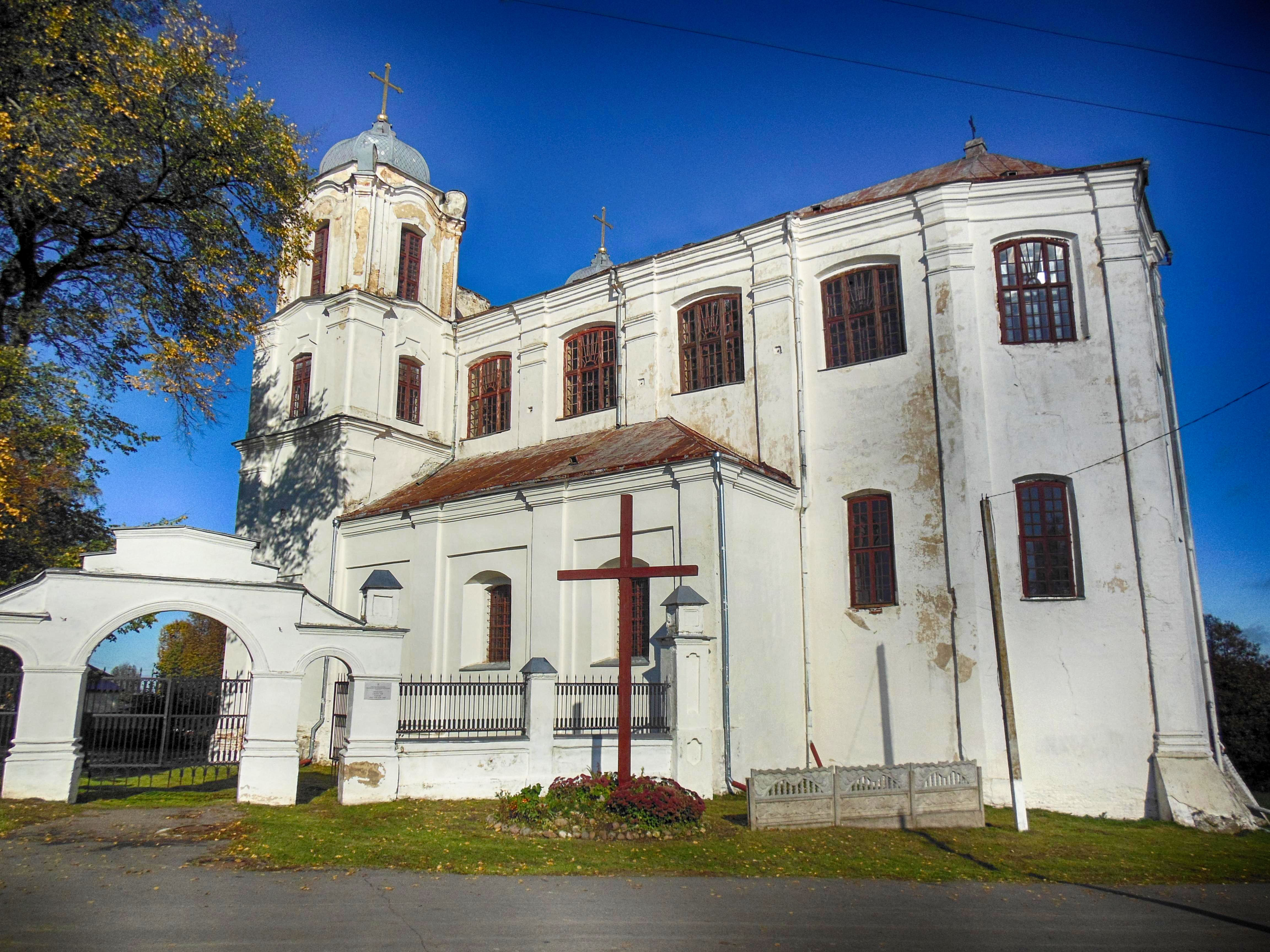
Church of the Assumption of the Blessed Virgin Mary

== See also ==
- National Radioactive Waste Repository
