= Chelubey =

Legendary Tatar champion (died 1380)

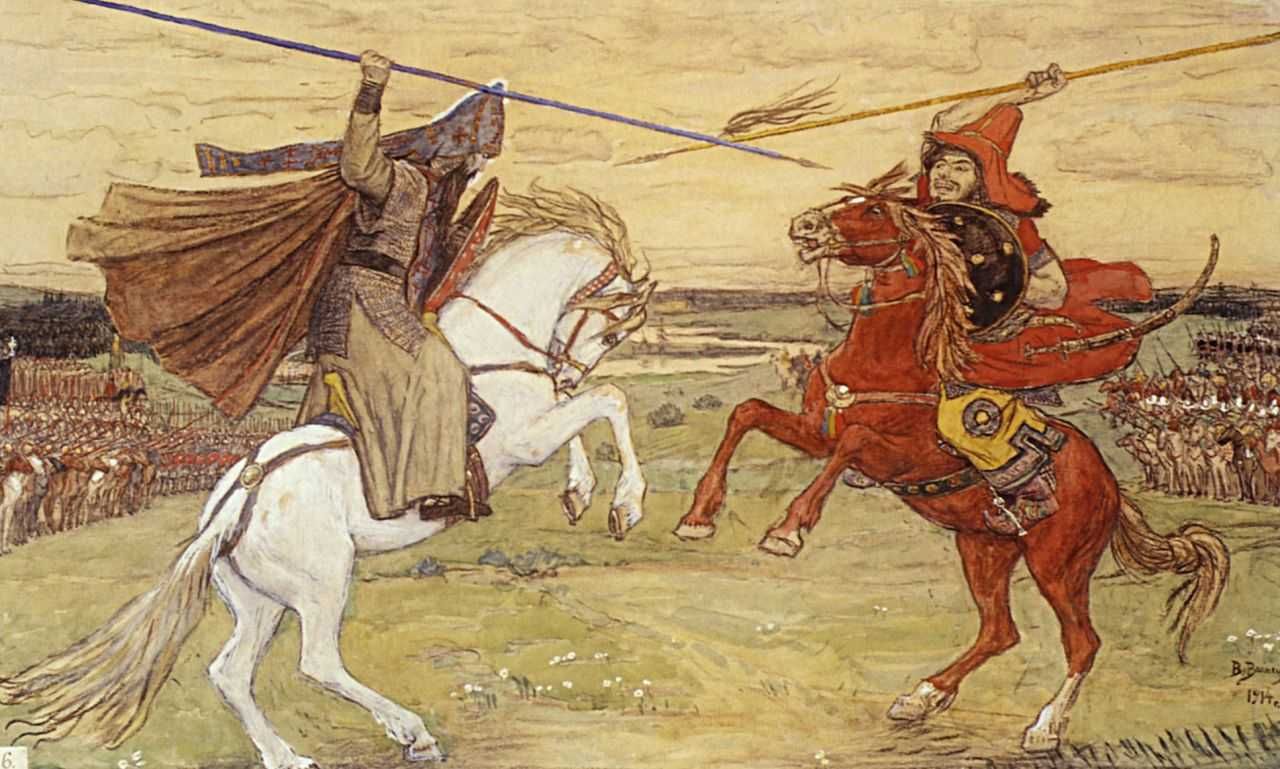
Duel of Peresvet with Chelubey, painting by Viktor Vasnetsov (1914)

Temir-Mirza (Russian: Темир-Мирза; died 8 September 1380; also spelled Temir-Murza), known in most Russian sources as Chelubey (Russian: Челубей), (Note: Also spelled Chelibey (Челибей) and Chalabay (Чалабай)) was a Tatar champion who fought in single combat against the Russian champion Aleksandr Peresvet at the opening of the Battle of Kulikovo in 1380, according to the Tale of the Battle with Mamai, a 15th-century Russian literary work from the Kulikovo cycle.

== Battle of Kulikovo ==
In the Tale of the Battle with Mamai, also known as the Tale of the Rout with Mamai, Chelubey is distinguished for his physical prowess and combat skills, where he was regarded as a veteran warrior.

According to the Tale, Chelubey and the Russian champion Aleksandr Peresvet fought on horseback at the opening of the Battle of Kulikovo in 1380 with spears, and both men killed each other simultaneously. Chelubey's body was knocked off his horse, while Peresvet's body did not fall from his saddle, which the Russians regarded as a good omen.

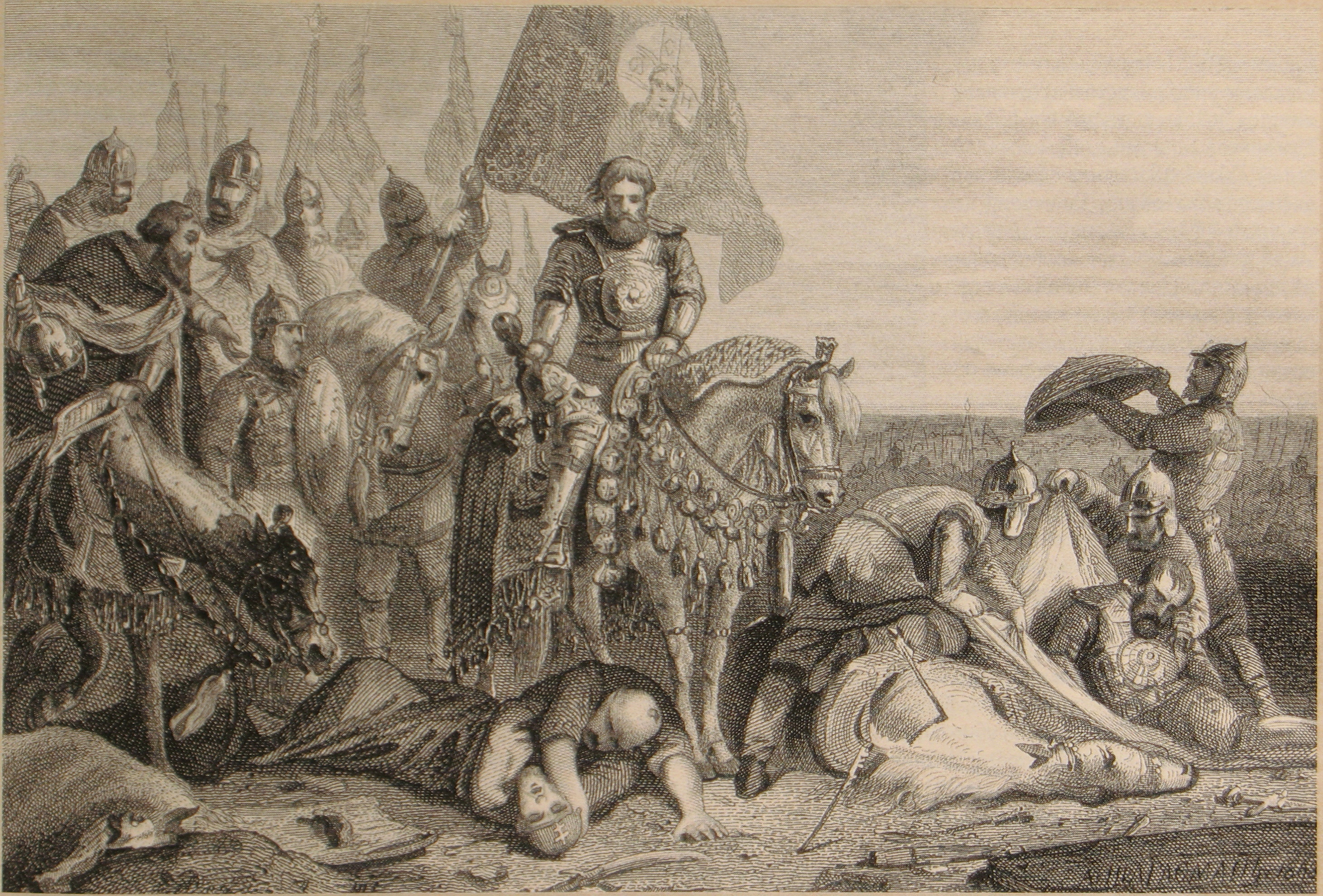
Dmitry Donskoy and the bodies of Peresvet and Chelubey, illustration by Boris Chorikov (19th century)

In the text of Zadonshchina, Peresvet is instead described as being alive in the midst of battle:

Brave Peresvet galloped across the meadow on his magic white horse telling everyone: 'Brothers! Now is the time for all old men to get young and for all young men to gain honor and to test their backs!'

— Zadonshchina

== In popular culture ==
- The Swans of Nepryadva (1980)

== See also ==
- Rodion Oslyabya

== Bibliography ==
- Galeotti, Mark (21 February 2019). Kulikovo 1380: The battle that made Russia. Bloomsbury Publishing. pp. 57–60. ISBN 978-1-4728-3123-1.
