= The Swans of Nepryadva =

1980 film by Roman Davydov

The Swans of Nepryadva (Russian: Лебеди Непрядвы) is a Soviet animated film about the medieval Battle of Kulikovo, released at its 600th anniversary. The film was directed by Roman Davydov at Soyuzmultfilm studio in 1980.

== Plot ==
Dmitry Donskoy rides to Sergius of Radonezh

The film starts with a history of the 13th century, showing the Mongol invasions and the Battle of the Kalka River. A century and a half later, Prince Dmitry Ivanovich of Moscow explains to his son why he rides to the Horde. Meanwhile, the Tatar warlord Mamai hears the report of his servant about the defeat of Mongol and Tatar forces iat the Battle of the Vozha River and decides to make a new campaign against the Russians.

Prince Dmitry prepares for the battle and takes a ride to Sergius of Radonezh for a blessing. After this, his army rides to Kulikovo Field. Together with an old commander Bobrok, he thinks over the strategy of the upcoming battle. By dawn, the Russians and the united Mongol and Tatar armies take position for battle. It starts with the duel of Alexander Peresvet and Chelubey. The former is a monk, one of two brothers that Sergius sent with Dmitry, and the latter is a Mongol warrior. In the duel, the warriors pierce each other with spears and die the same moment. The Russian army holds the pressure of the Mongols, until Mamai sends reinforcements. The knights of the ambush regiment, whose head is Bobrok, urge them to assist, but the commander waits for a signal.

== Cast ==
- Prince Dmitry Ivanovich — Konstantin Zakharov
- Sergius of Radonezh — Nikolai Sergeyev
- Voivoda Bobrok-Volinets — Stepan Bubnov
- Prince Vladimir — Lev Shabarin
- Peresvet — M. Kislyarov
- Blacksmith — Vladimir Burlakov
- Mamai — Vladimir Kenigson
- Text by historian — Felix Yavorsky

== Creators ==
- Director: Roman Davydov
- Script: Arkady Snessarev
- Art directors: Alexander Vinokurov, Nikolai Yerykalov
- Cameraman: Boris Kotov
- Music: Vladimir Krivtsov
- Sound: Vladimir Kutuzov
- Animators: Oleg Safronov, Viktor Shevkov, V. Komarov, Vladimir Zarubin, Fedor Yeldinov, Vladimir Shevchenko, Alexander Mazaev, Alexander Davydov, Vitaliy Bobrov, Alexei Bukin, Vladimir Vyshegorodtsev
- Historic consultant - professor dr. V. Buganov
- Editor: Elena Nikitkina
- Director of the picture: Nikolay Yevlukhin
