= Russian ship Oslyabya =

Two ships of the Imperial Russian Navy and one of the Russian Navy have been named Oslyabya after the Russian monk Rodion Oslyabya who participated in the Battle of Kulikovo.

- 1860 Russian frigate Oslyabya, 45-gun steam frigate sold for scrap in 1874
- 1898 Russian battleship Oslyabya, Peresvet-class pre-dreadnought battleship sunk by the Japanese during the Battle of Tsushima in 1905.
- 1981 Russian landing ship Oslyabya, Ropucha-class landing ship in active service since 1981.
