= Aleksandr Peresvet =

Russian Orthodox monk warrior and saint (died 1380)

Saint Aleksandr Peresvet Venerable (Prepodobny)
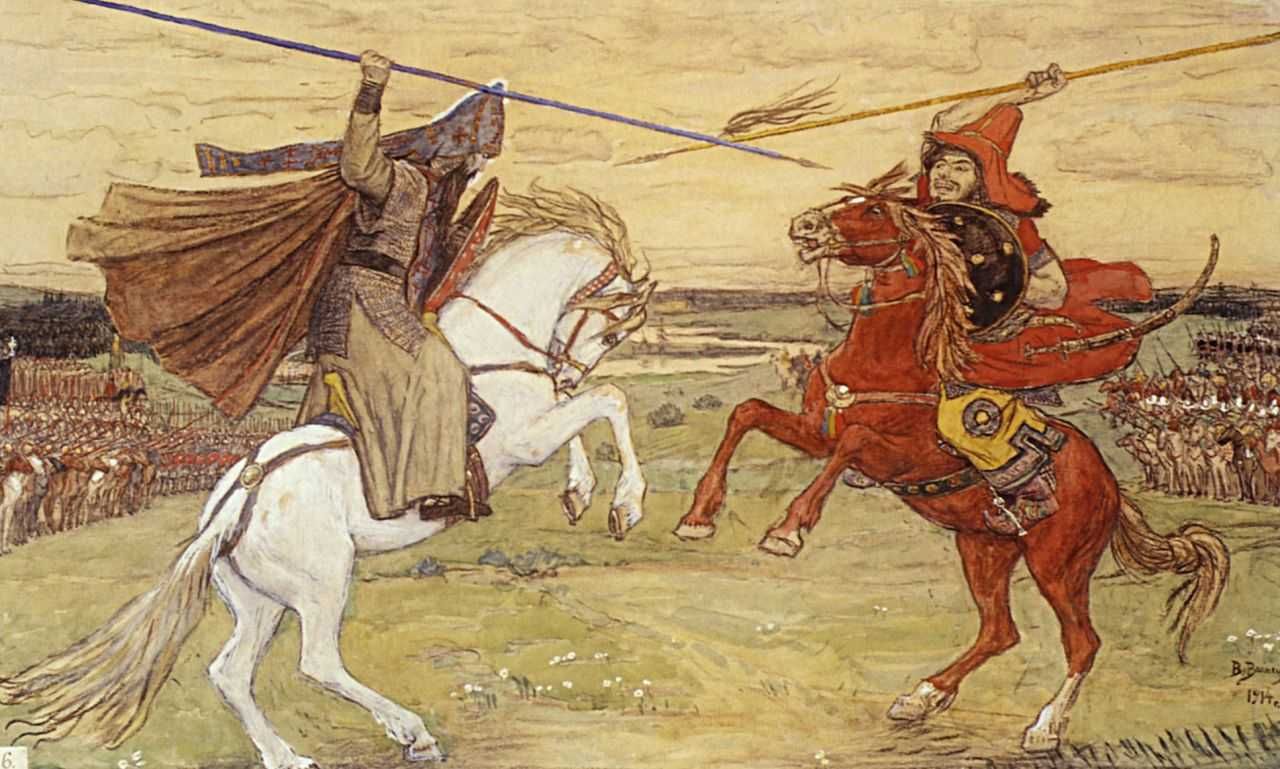
- Duel of Peresvet with Chelubei, painting by Viktor Vasnetsov (1914)
- Died: 8 September 1380; Kulikovo Field
- Venerated in: Russian Orthodox Church
- Feast: 7 September (20 September); Second Week after Pentecost - Feast of All Saints of Russia; Week before 26 August (8 September) - Synaxis of Saints of Moscow; 22 September (5 October) - Synaxis of Saints of Tula; 20 September (3 October) - Synaxis of Saints of Bryansk; 6 July (19 July) - Synaxis of Saints of Radonezh

Aleksandr Peresvet (Russian: Александр Пересвет; died 8 September 1380) was a Russian Orthodox monk who fought in single combat with the Tatar champion Temir-Mirza, (Note: Russian: Темир-Мирза; also spelled Temir-Murza) known in most Russian sources as Chelubey, at the opening of the Battle of Kulikovo on 8 September 1380. The two men killed each other.

== Life ==
Peresvet is believed to have hailed from the Bryansk area, and to have taken the monastic habit at the Monastery of Saints Boris and Gleb in Rostov. He moved to the monastery in Pereslavl-Zalessky, in the service of Dmitry Donskoy. He later moved to the Trinity Lavra where he became a follower of Sergius of Radonezh. Aleksandr and his friend Rodion Oslyabya joined the Russian troops set out to fight the Tatars under the leadership of Mamai.

The Battle of Kulikovo was opened by single combat between the two champions. The Russian champion was Aleksandr Peresvet. The champion of the Golden Horde was Temir-Mirza, known in most Russian sources as Chelubey. The champions killed each other in the first charge. According to a Russian legend, Peresvet did not fall from the saddle, while Temir-Mirza did.

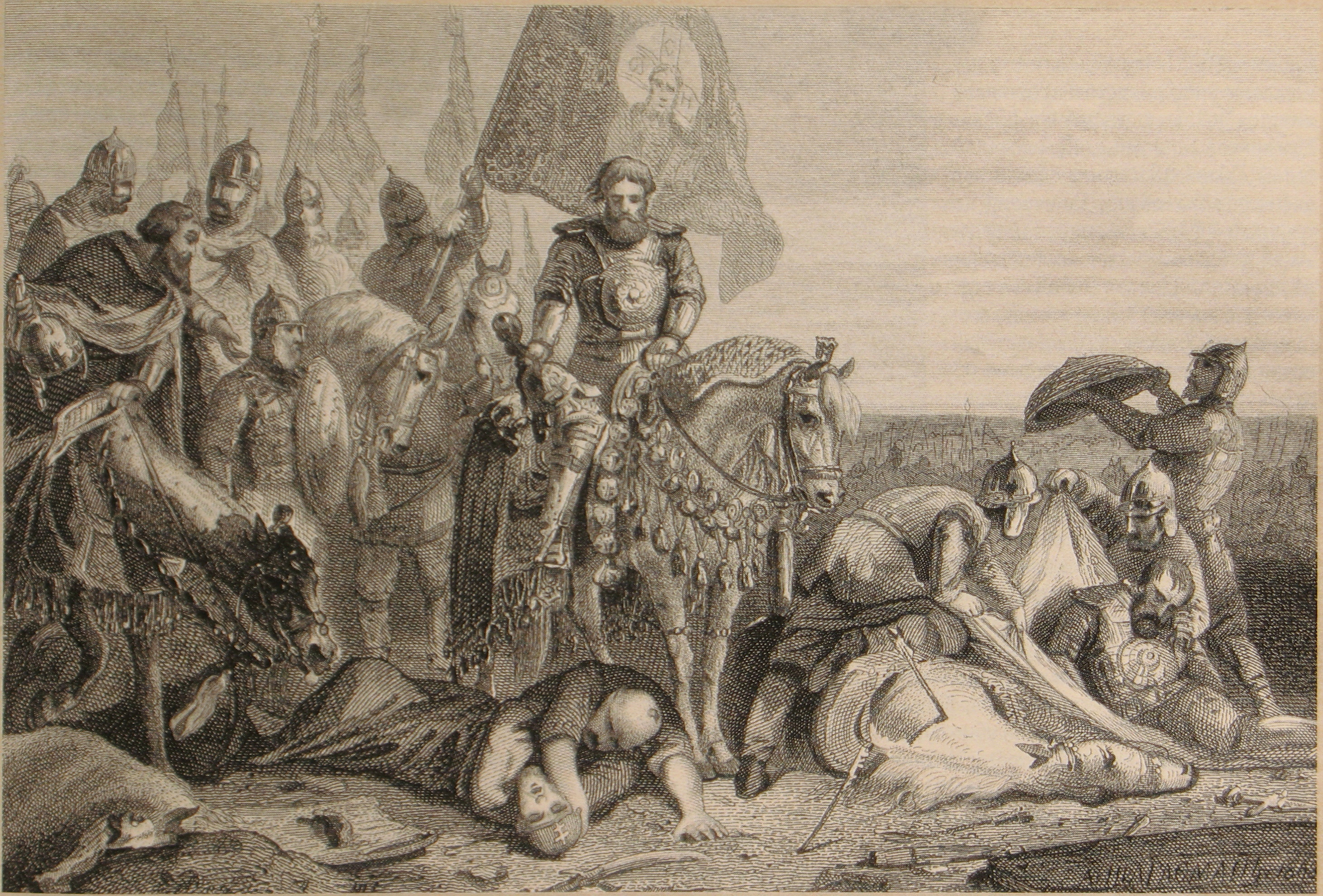
Dmitry Donskoy and the bodies of Peresvet and Chelubey, illustration by Boris Chorikov (19th century)

In contrary, the epic Zadonshchina described Aleksandr Peresvet as still being alive until the battle began, at least alive long enough for him to make one last speech.

Brave Peresvet galloped across the meadow on his magic white horse telling everyone: 'Brothers! Now is the time for all old men to get young and for all young men to gain honor and to test their backs!'

— Zadonshchina

Even if Zadonshchina is accurate, it is unlikely that Aleksandr Peresvet survived the Battle of Kulikovo, as no monastery or church record makes any mention of where else he served after the war.

Even if Peresvet survived Battle of Kulikovo in 1380, he certainly died at some point before his brother-in-arms Rodion Oslyabya died in 1398, as the two men were buried together in Simonov Monastery.

== Commemoration ==
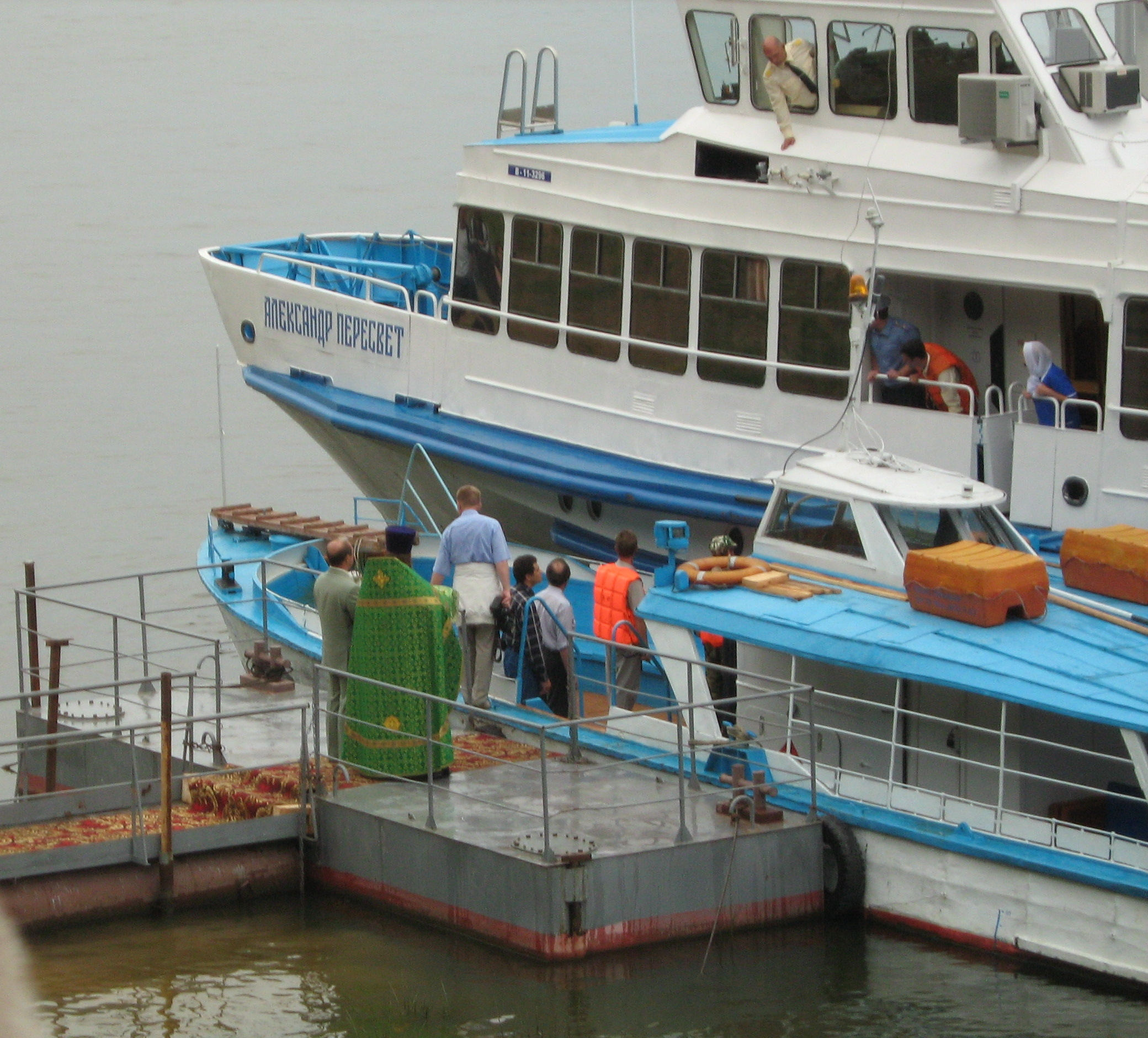
MV Aleksander Peresvet carrying the holy relics of Venerable Macarius stops in Kstovo, on its way from Nizhny Novgorod to Makaryev Monastery

- Pereswetoff-Morath, a bayor (Russo-Swedish nobility) family, have been claimed to be descendants of Peresvet.
- Peresvet-class battleships, including the lead ship Peresvet, ships of which saw action in the Russo-Japanese War
- Russian landing ship Peresvet, a Ropucha-class landing ship of the Russian Navy, named Peresvet since 2006.
- A Volga boat is named Aleksandr Peresvet
- Armed patrol icebreaker Peresvet
- The town of Peresvet near Moscow
- A fast train running between Moscow and Saint Petersburg since 2003.
- Russian military laser ‘Peresvet’ named so after a 2018 'name that weapon' vote

== Bibliography ==
- "Пересвет" . Brockhaus and Efron Encyclopedic Dictionary (in Russian). 1906.
- Титов А. А. Предание о ростовских князьях. М., 1885
- Описание Свято-Димитриевского монастыря в г. Скопине. Издательство Свято-Димитриевского монастыря, 2000.
- Рязанские епархиальные ведомости. 1891, No. 2, 3.
- Лошиц Ю. М. Дмитрий Донской., М., 1996
- Розанов Н. П. История церкви Рождества Пресвятые Богородицы на Старом Симонове в Москве. К её пятисотолетию (1370—1870). М., 1870
- Благословение преподобного Сергия. Под редакцией В.Силовьева. Изд.совет РПЦ, 2005 ISBN 5-94625-127-9
