= Oslyabya =

14th-century Russian noble

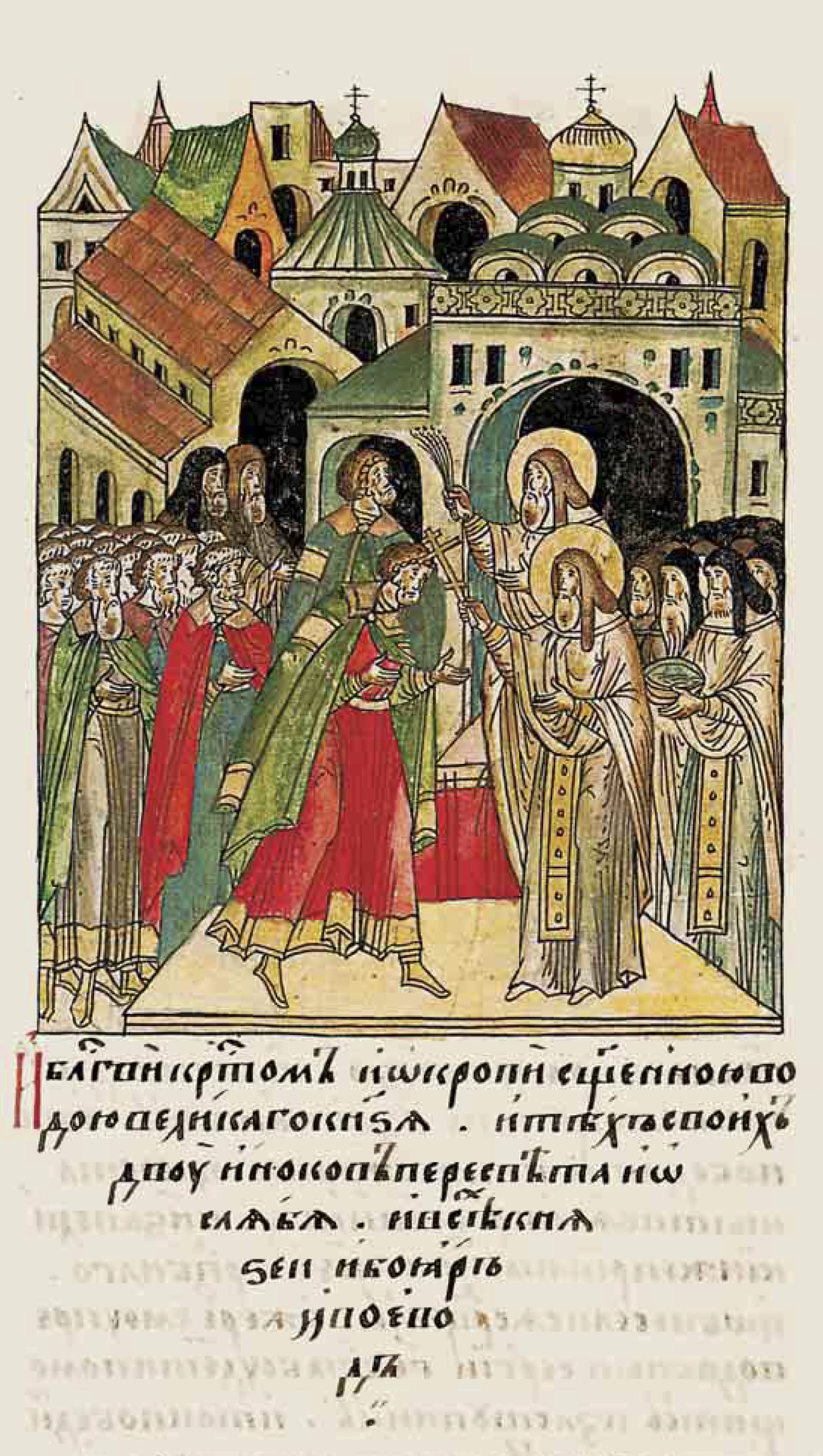
Blessing of Peresvet and Oslyabya in 1380, miniature from the Illustrated Chronicle of Ivan the Terrible

Oslyabya (Note: Alternatively transliterated as Osliabia or Osliaba.) (Russian: Ослябя; monastic name: Andrey; (Note: He is sometimes mistakenly identified as Rodion Oslyabya; Russian: Родион Ослябя.) died after 1392) was a Russian nobleman who is traditionally said to have become a monk of the Trinity Lavra of Sergius of Radonezh; he became famous for his part in the Battle of Kulikovo in 1380.

== Life ==
He is traditionally believed to have been a boyar (noble) before taking monastic vows. He hailed from Lyubutsk and took part in the uprising in the Bryansk principality against Lithuanian rule in 1369–1370. He entered the service of Grand Prince Dmitry Donskoy in 1370 and received estates near Moscow. Oslyabya was also the name of a real person in the Russian metropolitan's court around this time, likely a boyar, but never a monk.

According to hagiographic tradition, he accepted vows just prior to the Battle of Kulikovo in 1380. Oslyabya accompanied Aleksandr Peresvet in the Russian army of Dmitry Donskoy and took part in the battle. Dmitry was given the two monk warriors by Sergius of Radonezh.

The writer of Zadonshchina states:

Brave Peresvet passed through the field with a hiss on his wise mount, saying: "It is better that we perish by our own swords, than end up under the power of pagans." And Osliaba said to his brother Peresvet: "I see already deep wounds in your heart. Your head already lies on the grey ground, like on the white feathergrass of my son Iakov."

Following their dialogue, the writer states: "Sisters, our husbands are not alive anymore, they laid their heads by the swift Don for Russian land, for holy churches, for the Orthodox faith..." The Russian Chronograph, compiled in 1516–1522 in the Joseph-Volokolamsk Monastery, says that Oslyabya was the first duellist in the battle. However, later works of the Kulikovo cycle mention only Peresvet, as this story of Oslyabya was not further developed.

In The Tale of the Battle with Mamai, Dmitry is claimed to have said to Sergius:

"Give me, father, two warriors from your troops, Peresvet and his brother Osliaba, that way you will yourself be helping us." The saintly elder told them to get ready quickly. They obeyed the saintly elder and did not refuse. And instead of earthly weapons he gave them an incorruptible one—a cross of Christ, sewn on their schemas, and told them to place it instead of helmets on themselves. And he gave them into the hands of the grand prince and said to him: "Here are my soldiers for you, and your chosen ones." And to them he said: "Peace be with you, brothers, struggle as good warriors of Christ."

The mention of monasticism and his monastic name is first found in The Tale, from which it made its way into the extended version of Zadonshchina. His monastic name was Andrey, but this has sometimes mistakenly been identified as Rodion, with Andrey instead being taken as his secular name. In later versions of The Tale, Oslyabya is mentioned as a monk of the Trinity Lavra, with some manuscripts erroneously stating that he was killed in battle. In documents dating to 1390–1392, he is mentioned as a boyar in the court of the metropolitan. Kati Parppei states: "While both Aleksandr Peresvet and Osliaba may have been historical figures, their inclusion in The Tale as two warrior monks is, without any serious doubt, an invention".

== Personal life ==
Oslyabya had three sons. His first son, Yakov Oslebyatev (died 1380), was killed in the Battle of Kulikovo, according to Zadonshchina. His second son, Akinf Oslebyatev (died after 1425), was a boyar in the court of the metropolitan. His third son, Rodion Oslebyatev (died after 1398), was a boyar who participated in a diplomatic mission to the Byzantine emperor in 1398.

== Legacy ==
He was canonized as a saint of the Russian Orthodox Church. It is not known exactly when local veneration of Oslyabya began, but in the mid-17th century, the names of Oslyabya and Peresvet were included in the calendar of saints in the menologium of Simon (Azarin). By the end of the century, both of their names were included in the Description of Russian Saints.

Oslyabya is said to have been buried at the Nativity Church in the Simonov Monastery, Moscow, together with Peresvet. The 1860 sailing frigate Oslyabya, the 1898 battleship Oslyabya, and the 1981 landing ship Oslyabya have been named after him.

== Sources ==
- "Ослябя" . Brockhaus and Efron Encyclopedic Dictionary (in Russian). 1906.
- Fennell, John L. (14 January 2014) [1995]. A History of the Russian Church to 1488. Routledge. ISBN 978-1-317-89720-0.
- Kuzmin, A. V. (2014). "Ослябя". In Kravets, S. L. (ed.). Большая Российская энциклопедия. Том 24: Океанариум — Оясио (in Russian). Большая Российская энциклопедия. pp. 541–542. ISBN 978-5-85270-361-3.
- Miller, David B. (5 November 2010). Saint Sergius of Radonezh, His Trinity Monastery, and the Formation of the Russian Identity. Cornell University Press. ISBN 978-1-5017-5661-0.
- Parppei, Kati M. J. (5 January 2017). The Battle of Kulikovo Refought: “The First National Feat”. BRILL. ISBN 978-90-04-33794-7.
- Trubachyov, A. S. (2000). "Александр (Пересвет) и Андрей (Ослябя) Радонежские". Православная энциклопедия. Т. I: А — Алексий Студит (in Russian). Moscow: Православная энциклопедия. pp. 532–533. ISBN 5-89572-006-4.
- Wieczynski, Joseph L., ed. (1982). "Osliaba, Rodion". The Modern Encyclopedia of Russian and Soviet History. Vol. 26. Academic International Press. p. 132. ISBN 978-0-87569-064-3.
