= Alexander Bubnov =

Russian painter

Aleksandr Pavlovich Bubnov
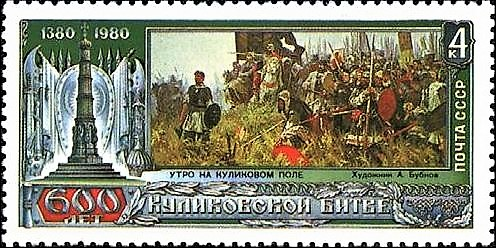
- Postage stamp of the USSR on the 600th anniversary of the Battle of Kulikovo
- Born: 4 March 1908; Tbilisi, Tiflis Governorate, Russian Empire
- Died: 30 July 1964 (aged 56); Moscow, Soviet Union
- Education: Higher Art and Technical Institute, (Vkhutein)
- Known for: Painting
- Movement: Russian avant-garde, socialist realism
- Awards: Stalin Prize

Aleksandr Pavlovich Bubnov (Russian: Алекса́ндр Па́влович Бу́бнов; 4 March 1908 – 30 July 1964) was a Soviet painter, best known for the portraits of Stalin and for a monumental canvas, "Morning on the Kulikovo Field". He was awarded the Stalin Prize in 1948, and became a corresponding member of the Soviet Academy of Arts in 1954.

== Biography ==
=== Early years ===
Aleksandr Pavlovich Bubnov was born on 4 March [O.S. 20 February] 1908 in Tbilisi (modern Georgia) in the family of a serviceman. When the service was over, the family returned to the Saratov Province, in the town of Atkarsk. With the beginning of the First World War in 1914, the father was again called up for service, and the mother and the boy lived for three years in the village of Bubnovka with his grandfather. His father came back sick and the family again moved to Atkarsk, where the boy began to study at a school. In parallel with his studies in a regular school, he went to an art studio for a while, but it was soon closed due to the Russian Civil War. The young boy loved to draw and made sketches from life with pencil and charcoal. Fedorov, his teacher at an art studio, taught not only to draw, but also history and local history. His students participated in archaeological excavations near Atkarsk, where Bubnov also made sketches. In the group photo of graduates in 1926, he was taken with a pencil and an album for sketches. In 1926 or 1927 he moved to Moscow and entered the Higher Art and Technical Institute, (Vkhutein) where Konstantin Istomin was his teacher. In 1930 Vkhutein was split up into six smaller trade-oriented schools and its heritage began to be described by the derogatory (and dangerous) word "formalistic". Bubnov was also criticized for his style and did not turn to socialist realism until the middle nineteen-thirties.

=== Career ===
In 1929, Bubnov joined the Association of Artists of Revolutionary Russia (AKhRR) and began to participate in its exhibitions but in 1930 he was sent to Kuznetsktstroy in Siberia as a junior architect, and his painting work was interrupted. In 1932 he returned to Moscow. According to his memoirs, "The first work Killed in Battle was presented at the exhibition '15 years of the Red Army', the second, Whites in the Town, at the exhibition of young artists in 1934." In 1936, he painted the Oktyabriny (Octobering), showing the newly-invented secular Soviet naming rite intended to replace baptism (Krestiny in Russian). This painting was presented at the exhibition The Industry of Socialism. In the painting Yablochko (1938), which depicts a famous dance, Bubnov tried to draw from life, though not completely. He took part in the creation of a huge panel of "Well Known People of the U.S.S.R." for the 1939 New York World's Fair. In the same year he painted the picture Comrade Stalin Among Collective Farmers.

After the beginning of the Great Patriotic War, he drew propaganda posters, painted pictures on military subjects, such as Dying, but did not Surrender, To the Combat Position, Borodino Field in 1942. He also wrote a portrait of Alexander Matrosov. In 1943-1947 he produced his most famous work Morning on the Kulikovo Field, dedicated to the epic battle of the 14th century, and in 1948 was awarded the Stalin Prize for it.

After the war, Bubnov painted landscapes, genre scenes and pictures on mythological and historical themes; in particular, he created illustrations for Pushkin's ballad Song of the Wise Oleg. In 1954 he became a corresponding member of the USSR Academy of Arts, and was awarded the title Honoured Worker of the Arts Industry of the RSFSR. In the last years of his life he painted illustrations for the books of Gogol and Shevchenko. His triptych Pugachev. Popular uprising remained unfinished. He died on 30 July 1964 and was buried at the Novodevichy Cemetery in Moscow.
