= Simonov Monastery =

Former monastery in Moscow, Russia

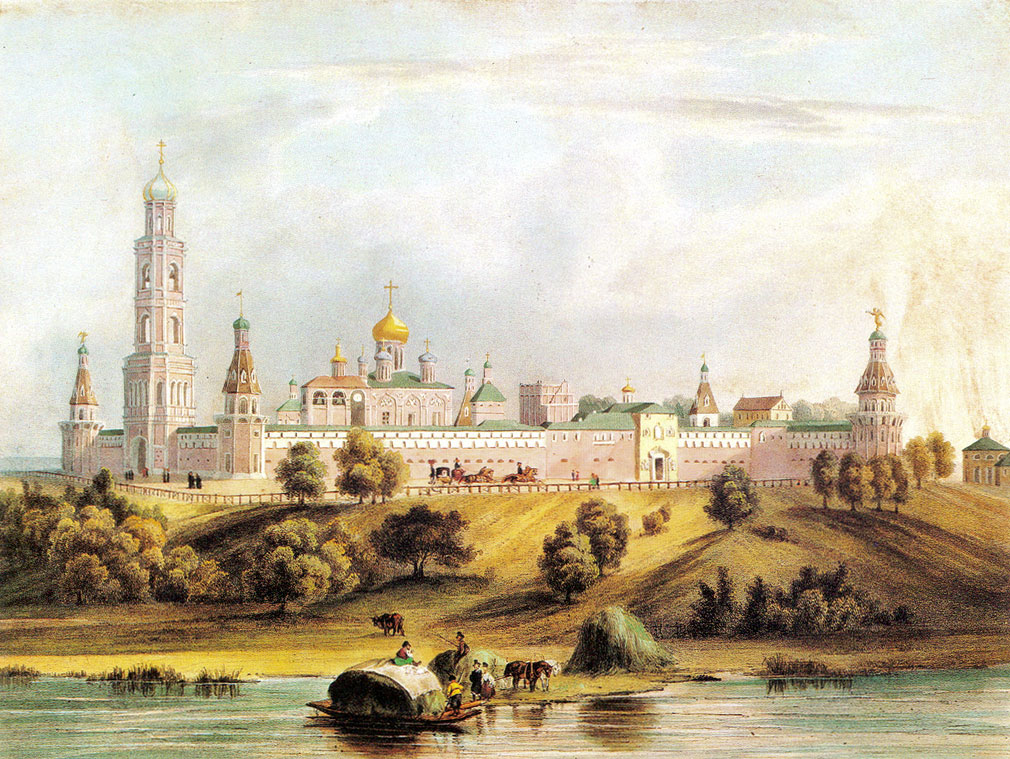
- A 19th-century watercolour view of the monastery
- Interactive map of Simonov Monastery

Monastery information
- Order: Orthodox
- Established: 1370
- Disestablished: 1920
- Diocese: Moscow

People
- Founder: Monk Feodor

Site
- Location: Moscow, Russia
- Coordinates: 55°42′49.57″N 37°39′23.75″E

Simonov Monastery (Russian: Симонов монастырь) in Moscow was established in 1370 by the monk Feodor, a nephew and disciple of St Sergius of Radonezh. It became one of the richest and most famous monasteries, comprising six major churches (often with multiple side chapels), and many icons. Job became the abbot in 1571, and became the first patriarch in Russia in 1589.

The monastery land formerly belonged to Simeon Khovrin, a boyar of Greek extraction and progenitor of the great clan of Golovins. He took monastic vows in the cloister under the name Simon (hence the name); many of his descendants are also buried there. In 1379, the monastery was moved a quarter mile to the north-east. Its original location, where bodies of the warriors killed in the Battle of Kulikovo such as Alexander Peresvet had been buried, is still commemorated by the old Simonov church.

During the 15th century, the cloister was the richest in Moscow. Among the learned monks who lived and worked there were Vassian Patrikeyev and Maximus the Greek. A white-stone cathedral was erected in 1405; it was later enlarged by order of Ivan the Terrible. As the monastery defended southern approaches to Moscow, it was heavily fortified in the 1640s. The last addition to the complex was a huge multi-storied bell-tower, modelled after Ivan the Great Bell Tower of Moscow Kremlin.

The monastery was abolished by the Communist government in 1923, and soon thereafter most of its buildings were demolished to make way for an automobile plant. Surviving structures all date back to the 17th century and include three towers of cannon-like appearance and auxiliary buildings in the Naryshkin baroque style. Recently the Moscow government announced plans for a full-scale reconstruction of the famous cloister.

According to several sources, part of the former monastery buildings was transferred in 1990 from the Ministry of Culture of the USSR to Russian Orthodox Church and Orthodox community of deaf people, who began the works on restoration and reconstruction of its facilities. The first service after the restoration was held in 1992.

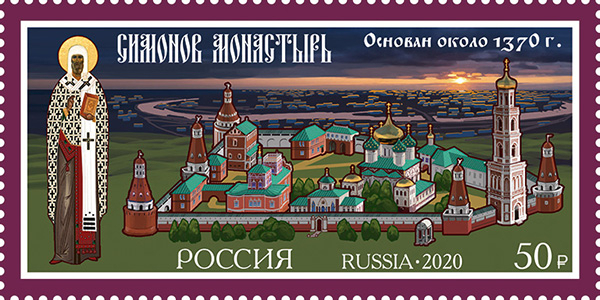
A 2020 Russian stamp dedicated to the 650th anniversary of the monastery

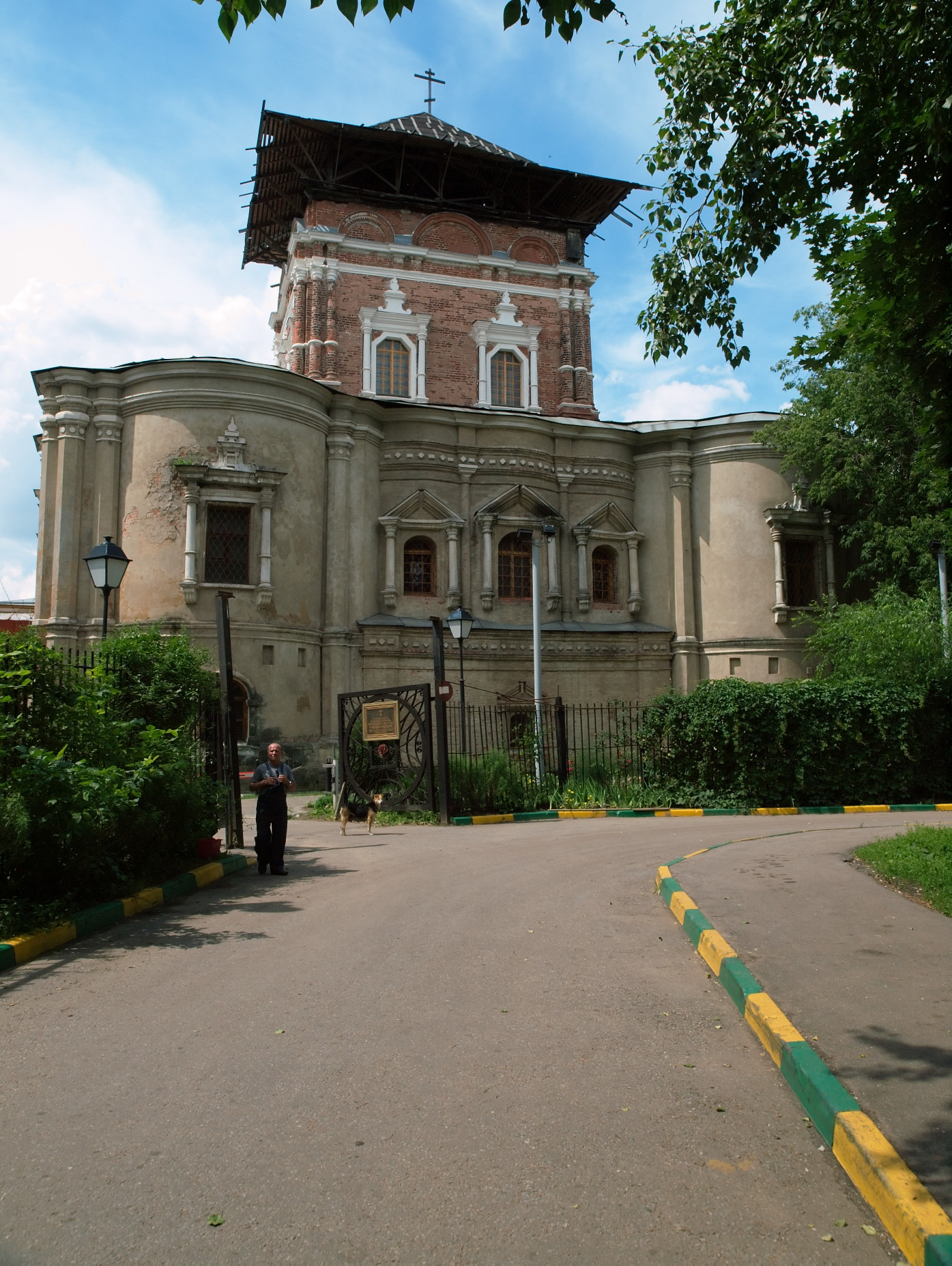
Osip Startsev's refectory.

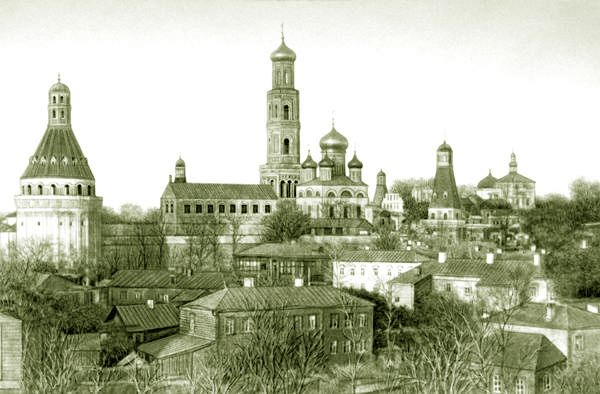
The earliest photograph of the monastery dates from 1882.

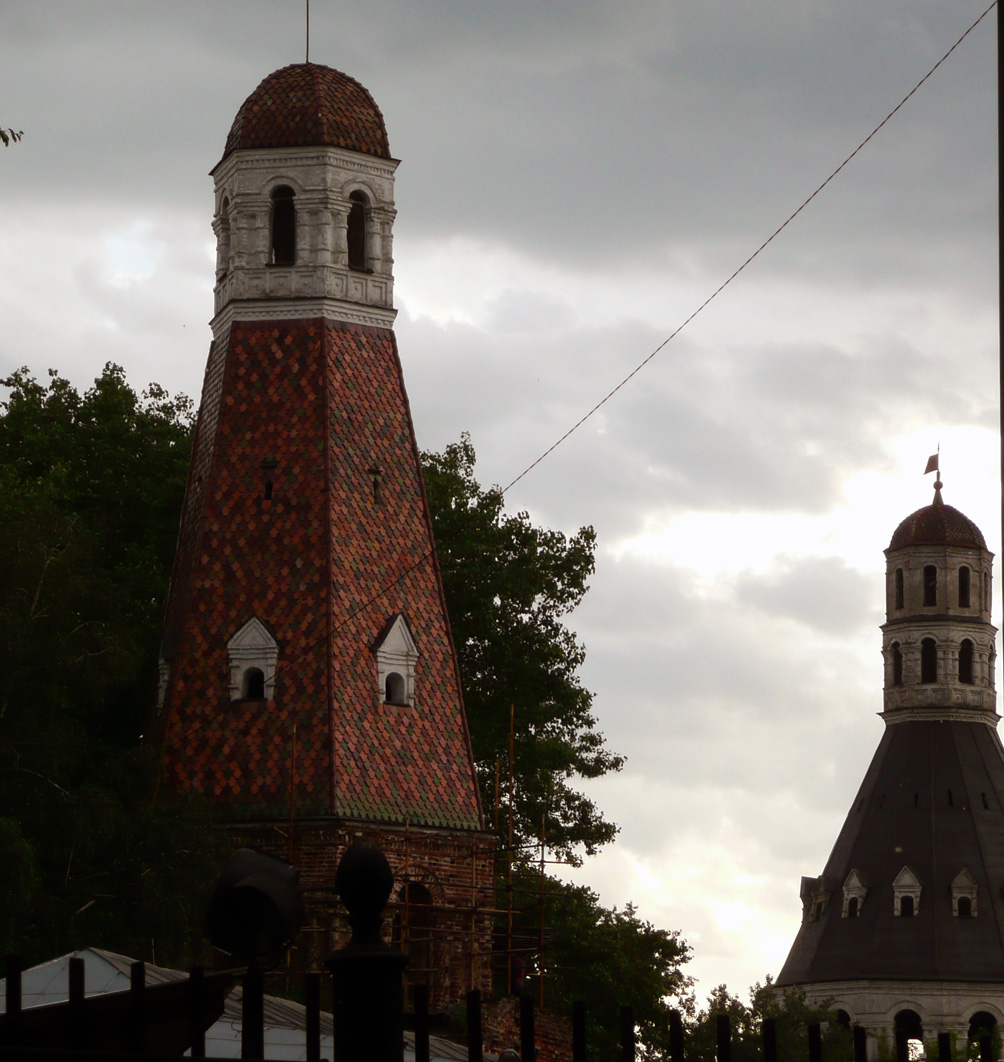
The distinctive appearance of the monastery towers is without a parallel anywhere in Russia.
