= Vasily Sazonov =

Russian painter (1789–1870)

- Василий Кондратьевич Сазонов
- Born: 1789; Gomel
- Died: May 17, 1870 (aged 80–81); Saint Petersburg
- Education: Member Academy of Arts (1830)
- Alma mater: Imperial Academy of Arts (1815)
- Known for: Painting
- Awards: Big Gold Medal of the Imperial Academy of Arts (1813)
- Patron: Count Nikolay Rumyantsev

Vasily Kondratievich Sazonov (Russian: Василий Кондратьевич Сазонов; 1789–1870) was a Russian history painter in the Classical style. Member of the Imperial Academy of Arts

== Biography ==
He was born a serf; belonging to Count Nikolay Rumyantsev. While participating in the hunts at Gomel Palace, young Sazonov would make sketches. These were noticed by the Count, who sent him to study at the Imperial Academy of Arts in 1804. He studied under the history painter Grigory Ugryumov and showed such rapid progress that the Count gave him his freedom.

He was heavily influenced by Ugryumov's style and also became a history painter. In 1812, he was awarded a gold medal for a scene from the life of Kuzma Minin and, in 1813, received another gold medal for a scene depicting the resistance to Napoleon's capture of Moscow.

He graduated in 1815 with the title of "Artist" and received a small stipend to continue his studies. In 1817, Count Rumyantsev gave him enough money to go abroad. He went to Rome, where he copied the Old Masters.

Upon returning to Saint Petersburg, he produced two major historical works: Dmitry Donskoy at the Battle of Kulikovo and Count Ostermann-Tolstoy undergoing surgery at the Battle of Kulm. Later, he painted an iconostasis for the newly rebuilt Transfiguration Cathedral and created decorations for the Tauride Palace. These projects earned him the title of Academician in 1830.

For the next twelve years, he received numerous commissions for religious paintings in Saint Petersburg's churches, interrupted by the occasional portrait. Some of his most notable works are in the church of the Semyonovsky Regiment and the church on Aptekarsky Island.

== Works ==
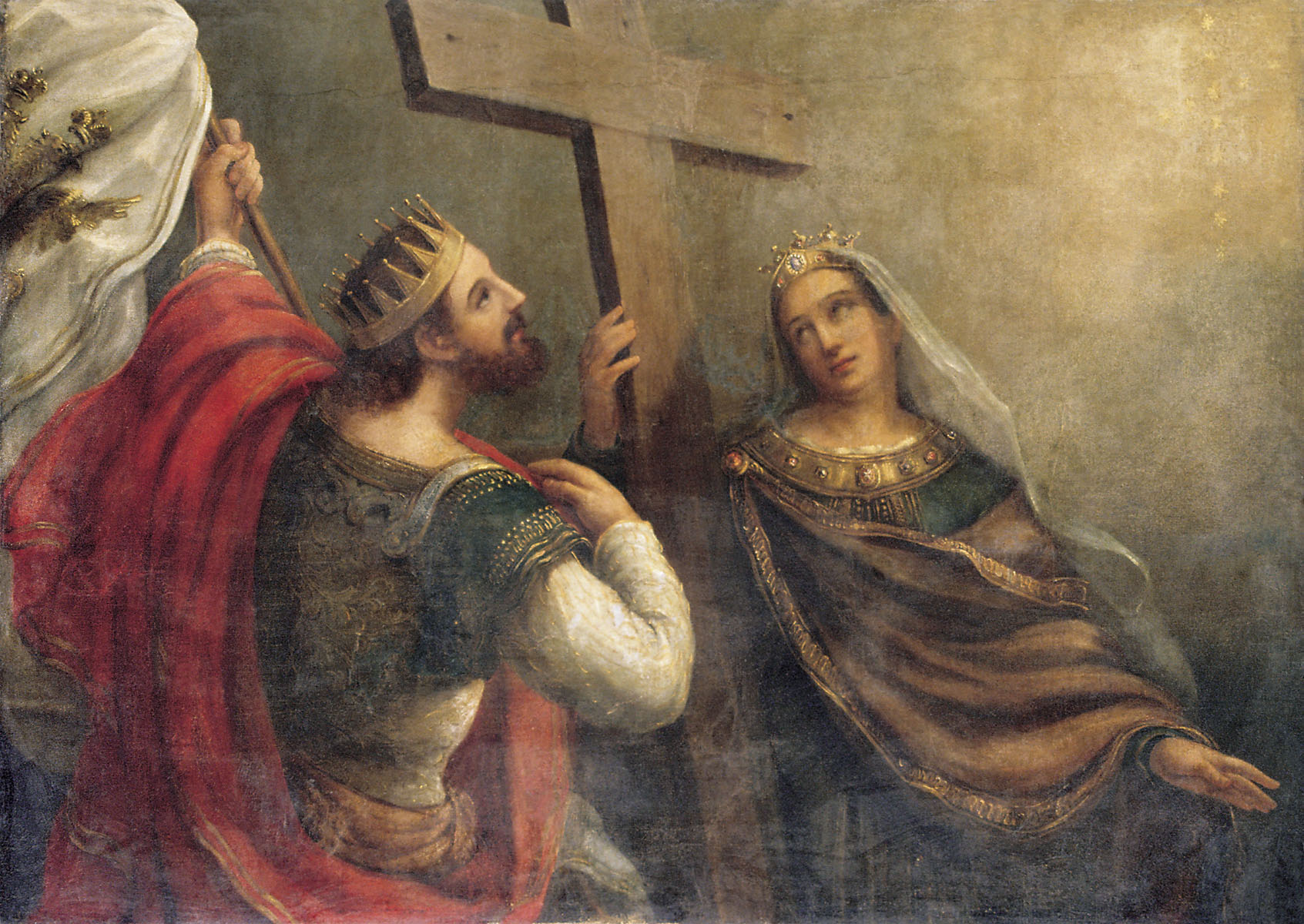
Saints Constantine and Helena present the Holy Cross

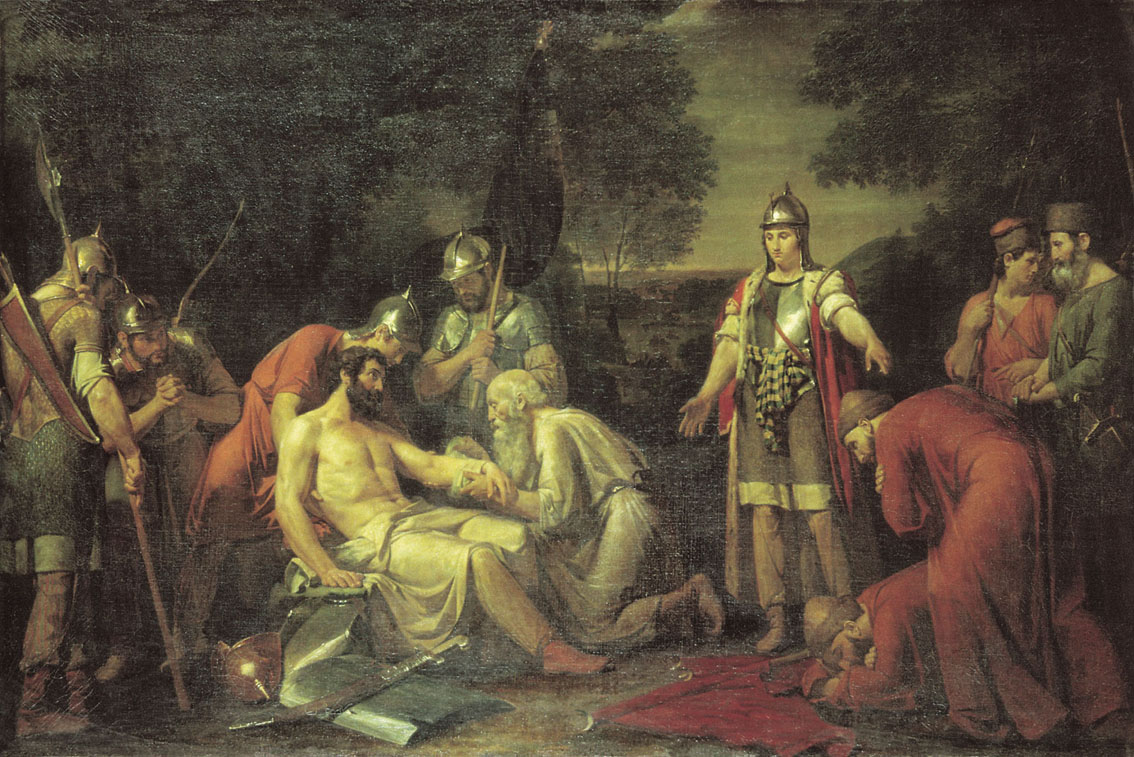
Dmitry Donskoy at the Battle of Kulikovo

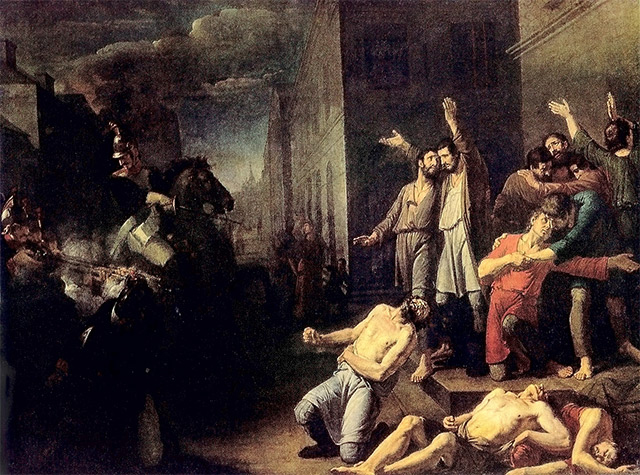
Shooting of the Russian Patriots

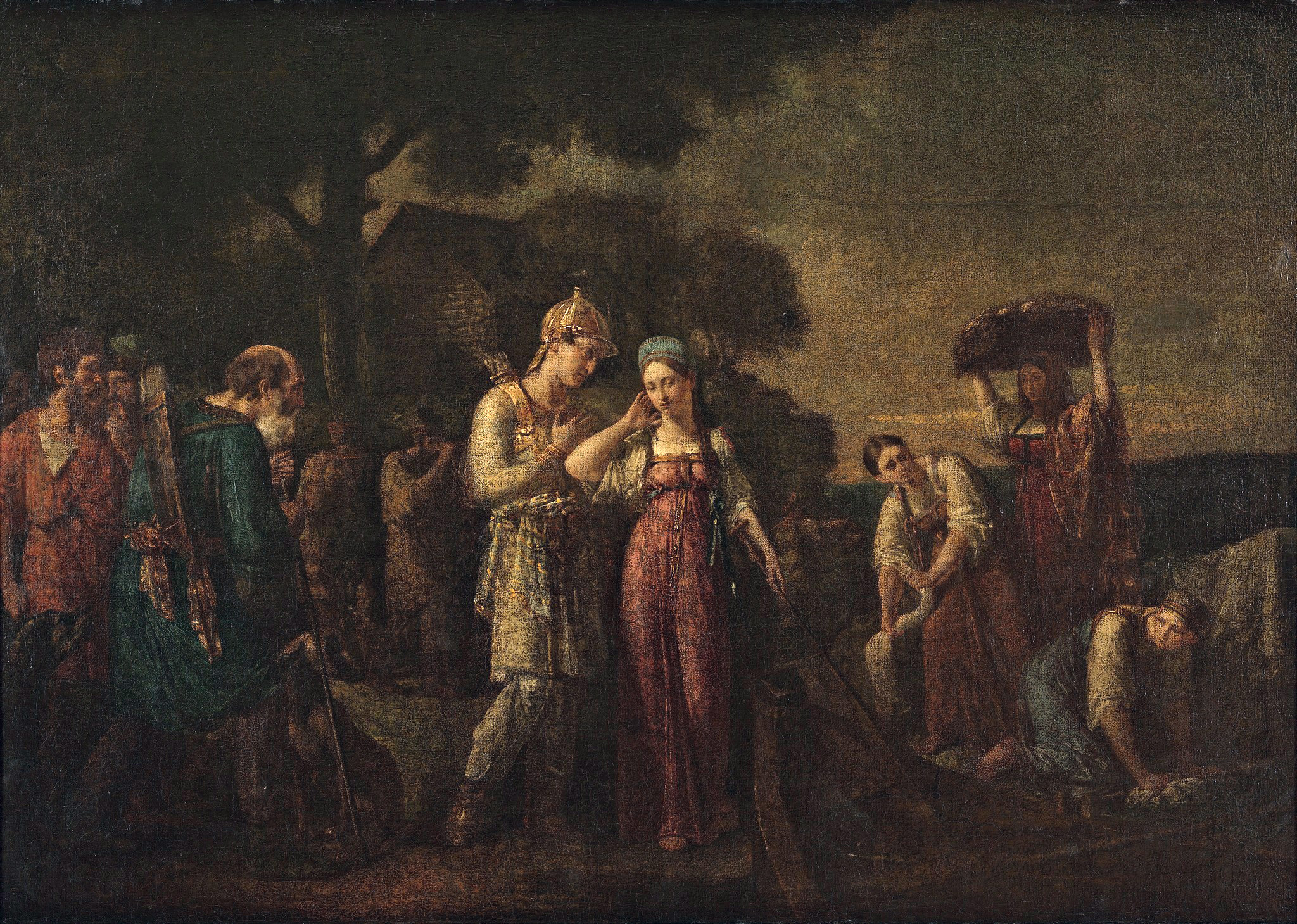
The first meeting of Prince Igor with Olga

== Literary sources ==
- С. Н. Кондаков (1915). Юбилейный справочник Императорской Академии художеств. 1764-1914 (in Russian). Vol. 2. pp. 174–175.
