= Peresvet =

Town in Moscow Oblast, Russia

Peresvet Пересвет
- Town
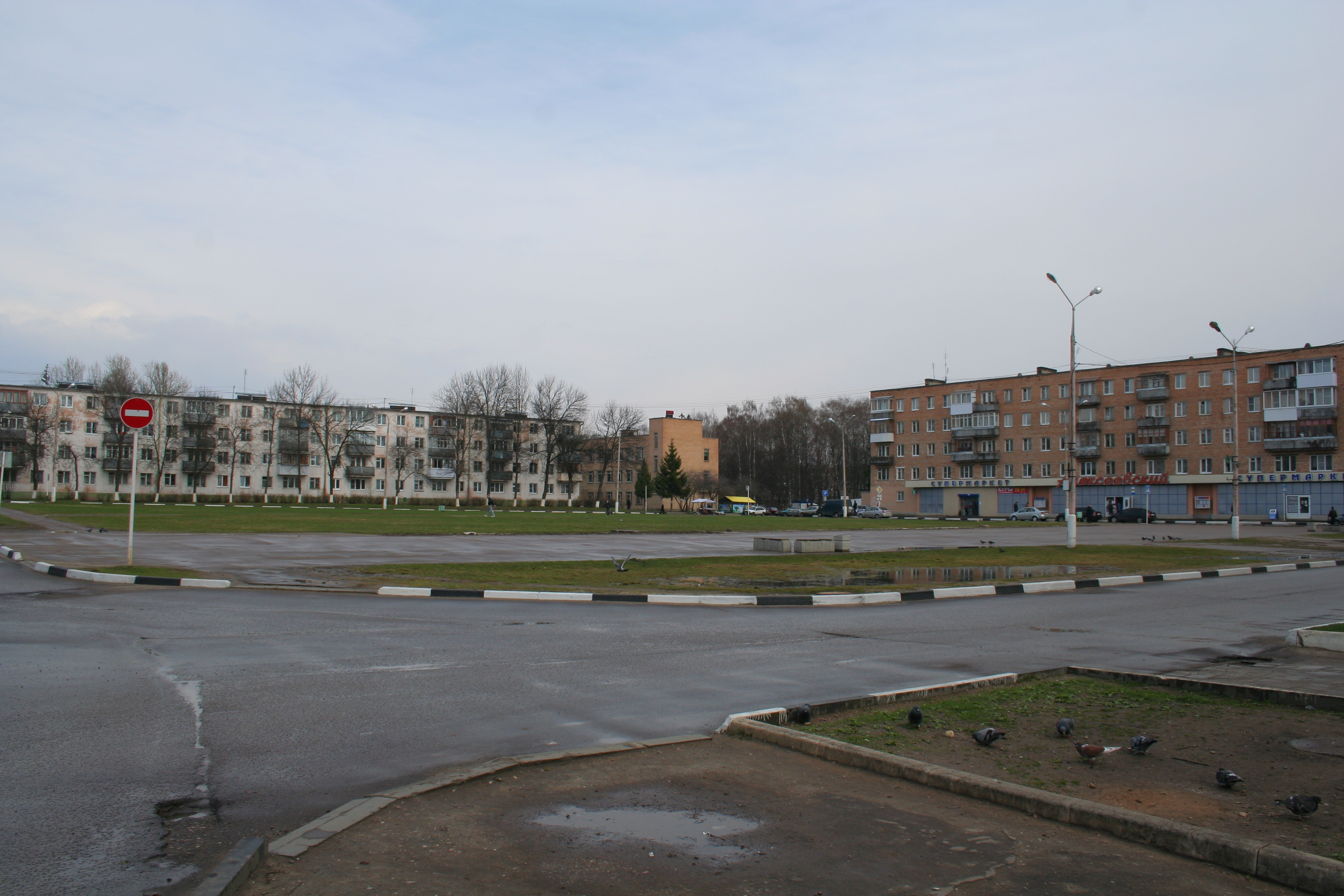
- Central square in Peresvet

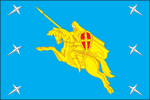
- Flag Coat of arms
- Interactive map of Peresvet
- Location of Peresvet Peresvet (Moscow Oblast)
- Coordinates: 56°26′N 38°07′E
- Country: Russia
- Federal subject: Moscow Oblast
- Administrative district: Sergiyevo-Posadsky District
- TownSelsoviet: Peresvet
- Founded: 1948
- Town status since: March 2000
- Elevation: 230 m (750 ft)

Population (2010 Census)
  - Total: 14,147
  - Estimate (2025): 11,421 (−19.3%)

Administrative status
  - Capital of: Town of Peresvet

Municipal status
  - Municipal district: Sergiyevo-Posadsky Municipal District
  - Urban settlement: Peresvet Urban Settlement
  - Capital of: Peresvet Urban Settlement
- Time zone: UTC+3 (MSK)
- Postal code: 141320
- OKTMO ID: 46728000011

Peresvet (Russian: Пересве́т) is a town in Sergiyevo-Posadsky District of Moscow Oblast, Russia, located on the Kunya River (Dubna's tributary) 90 kilometers (56 mi) northeast of Moscow and 17 kilometers (11 mi) north of Sergiyev Posad, the administrative center of the district. Population: 14,147 (2010 census); 14,719 (2002 census).

== History ==
It was founded in the summer of 1948 as the settlement of Novostroyka (Новостро́йка) servicing a research institute for bench testing of rocket engines and thermal vacuum chamber testing of spacecraft. During the Soviet period, the settlement was completely under the institute's authority and remained a restricted area until 1992. In the first post-Soviet years, it was managed by the administration of the town of Krasnozavodsk. On December 8, 1999, Novostroyka and a part of Krasnozavodsk containing the research institute were incorporated into the town of Peresvet (named after the medieval military hero Alexander Peresvet). The process was finalized on March 28, 2000.

== Administrative and municipal status ==
Within the framework of administrative divisions, it is, together with five rural localities, incorporated within Sergiyevo-Posadsky District as the Town of Peresvet. As a municipal division, the Town of Peresvet is incorporated within Sergiyevo-Posadsky Municipal District as Peresvet Urban Settlement.
