= Kulikovo Field =

Site of 14th century battle in Russia

Coordinates: 53°36′28″N 38°40′17″E

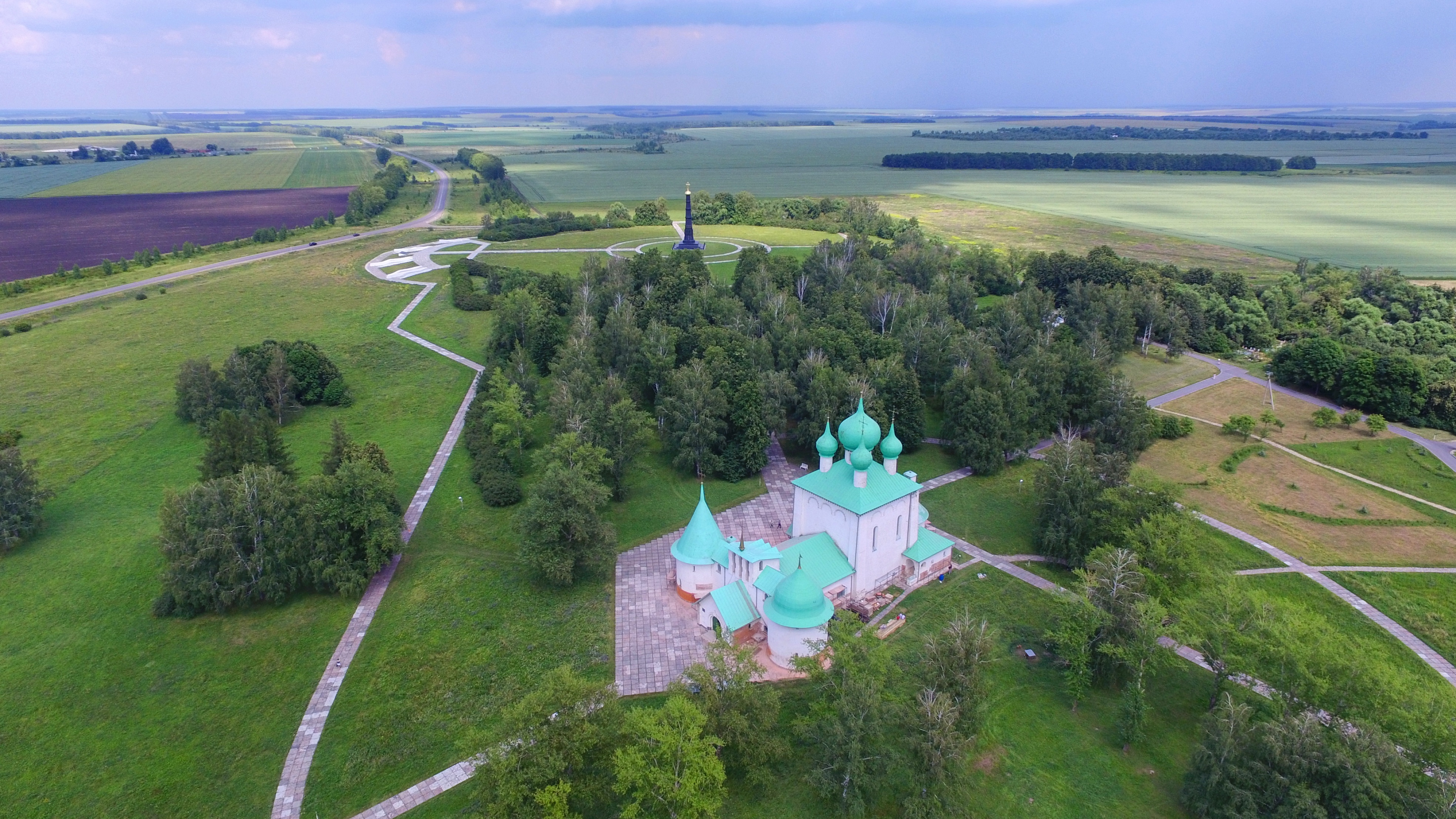
The memorial church of St. Sergius, with the 1850 column seen in the distance

Kulikovo Field (Russian: Куликово поле, romanized: Kulikovo pole, lit. 'snipe's field') is a field in the Kimovsky, Kurkinsky and Bogoroditsky districts of Tula Oblast in Russia.

It is where the Battle of Kulikovo took place on September 8, 1380, between a united Russian army led by Dmitry of Moscow and an army of the Golden Horde, under the command of Mamai. The battle was won by Dmitry, who received the name Donskoy ("of the Don").

== Description ==
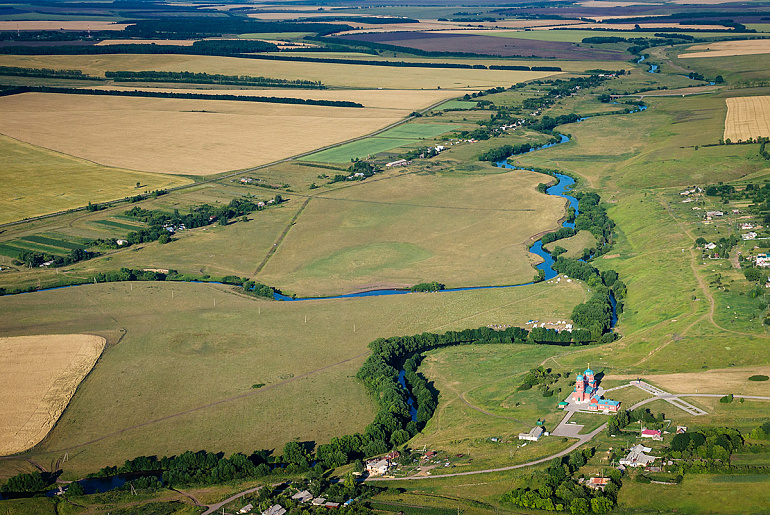
A bird's-eye view

As established by Stepan Nechayev in the 1830s, the battlefield is located between the rivers of Nepryadva, Krasivaya Mecha, and Don some 140 kilometres (87 mi) away from Tula and 23 kilometres (14 mi) away from the Kulikovo Pole railway station.

Today, Kulikovo Field is home to a museum complex to commemorate the battle, which includes a 28-metre-high (92 ft) column on the Red Hill (Красный Холм) built between 1848 and 1850, and a memorial church in honour of Sergius of Radonezh (built from 1913 to 1918 according to a design by Alexey Shchusev) that is now the Kulikovo Field Museum.

There is a stone church in the nearby settlement of Monastyrshchino (Монастырщино) where, according to a legend, the fallen Russian soldiers were interred after the battle. No burials have been found so far, which poses a puzzle for scholars who estimate that the battle claimed up to 200,000 lives on both sides.
