= Nepryadva =

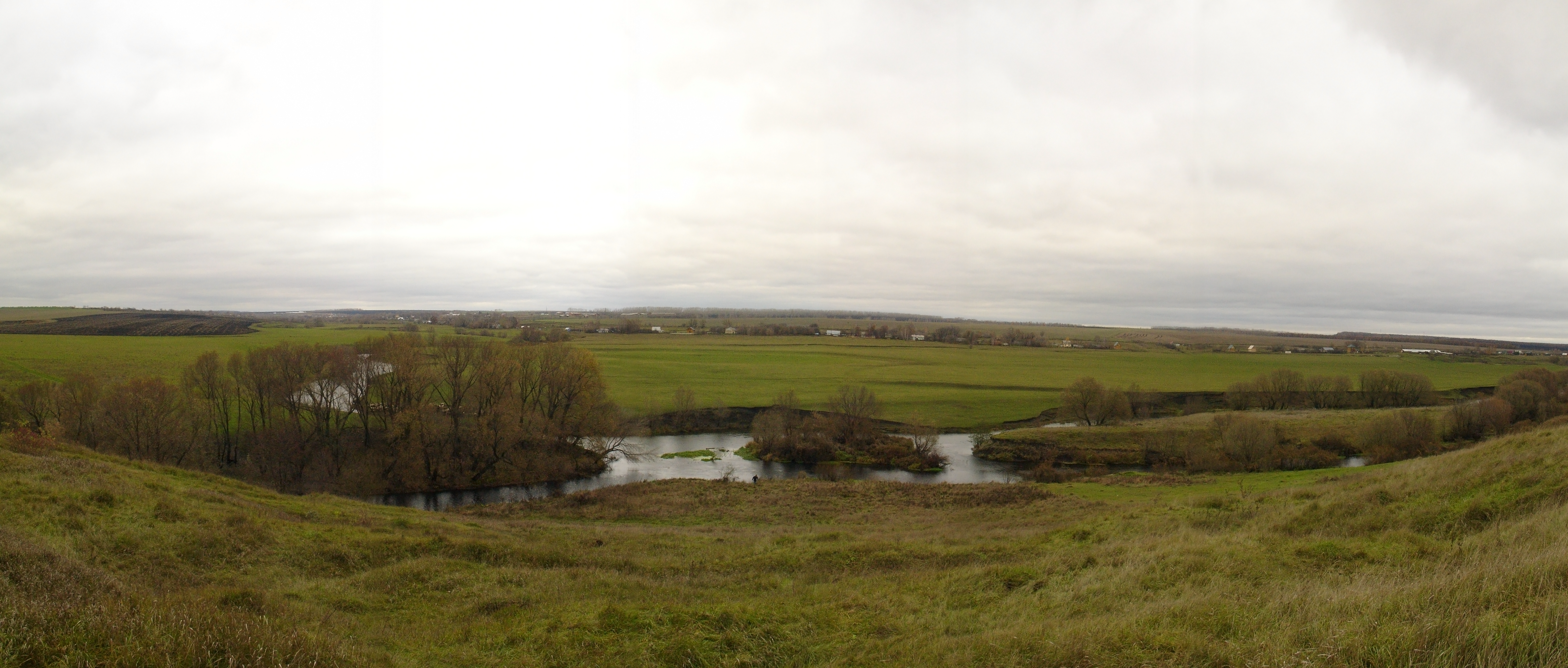
- Native name: Непрядва (Russian)

Location
- Country: Russia

Physical characteristics
- Mouth: Don
  - coordinates: 53.6645°N 38.6516°E
- Length: 67 km (42 mi)
- Basin size: 799 km^{2} (308 sq mi)

Basin features
- Progression: Don→ Sea of Azov

The Nepryadva (Russian: Непрядва) is a right tributary of the Don river in Tula Oblast, Russia. The river is 67 km long and its catchment area comprises 799 square kilometers.

Near the mouth of the river the Battle of Kulikovo was fought in the late summer of 1380.

== See also ==
- 2869 Nepryadva
