= The Tale of the Battle with Mamai =

15th or 16th century Russian literary work

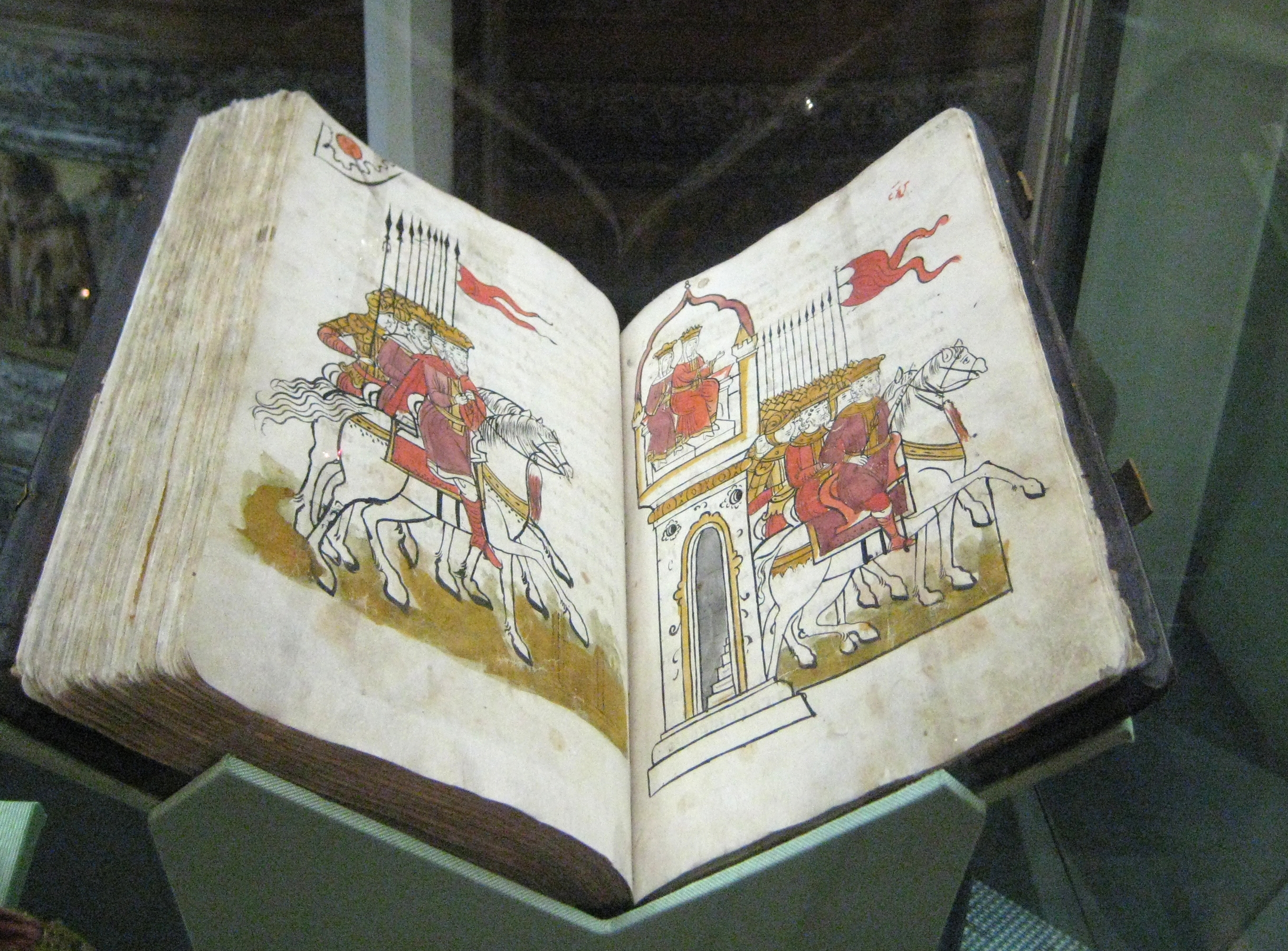
- 17th century manuscript in the State Historical Museum, Moscow
- Original title: Сказание о Мамаевом побоище
- Subject: Battle of Kulikovo
- Publication date: 15th century
- Publication place: Russia
- Original text: Сказание о Мамаевом побоище at Russian Wikisource

The Tale of the Battle with Mamai (Russian: Сказание о Мамаевом побоище, romanized: Skazaniye o Mamayevom poboishche), also translated as The Tale of the Battle Against Mamai, or The Tale of the Rout of Mamai, is a Russian literary work about the Battle of Kulikovo in 1380. The first version was likely produced in the 15th century, although some recent studies suggest that it was written in the early 16th century. It belongs to the Kulikovo cycle of works, along with the Chronicle Account of the Battle with Mamai and Zadonshchina.

The Tale starts with the following:

I want to tell you, brethren, about the battles of the recent war, about how the battle on the Don between Grand Duke Dmitry Ivanovich and all Orthodox Christians and the infidel Mamai and the godless sons of Hagar [Muslims] came about.

== Bibliography ==
- Bulanin, Dmitrij M. (25 August 2021). "Alexander the Great and other personages in the 'Tale of the Battle against Mamai'". The Routledge Handbook of the Mongols and Central-Eastern Europe. Routledge. pp. 449–464. ISBN 978-1-000-41745-6.
- Ciževskij, Dmitrij (18 February 2013). History of Russian Literature: From the Eleventh Century to the End of the Baroque. Walter de Gruyter. ISBN 978-3-11-087101-2.
- Crummey, Robert O. (6 June 2014). The Formation of Muscovy 1300–1613. Routledge. ISBN 978-1-317-87200-9.
- Galeotti, Mark (21 February 2019). Kulikovo 1380: The battle that made Russia. Bloomsbury Publishing. ISBN 978-1-4728-3122-4.
- Isoaho, Mari (1 June 2006). The Image of Aleksandr Nevskiy in Medieval Russia: Warrior and Saint. BRILL. ISBN 978-90-474-0949-6.
- Terras, Victor (1 January 1985). Handbook of Russian Literature. Yale University Press. ISBN 978-0-300-04868-1.
