= Krasivaya Mecha =

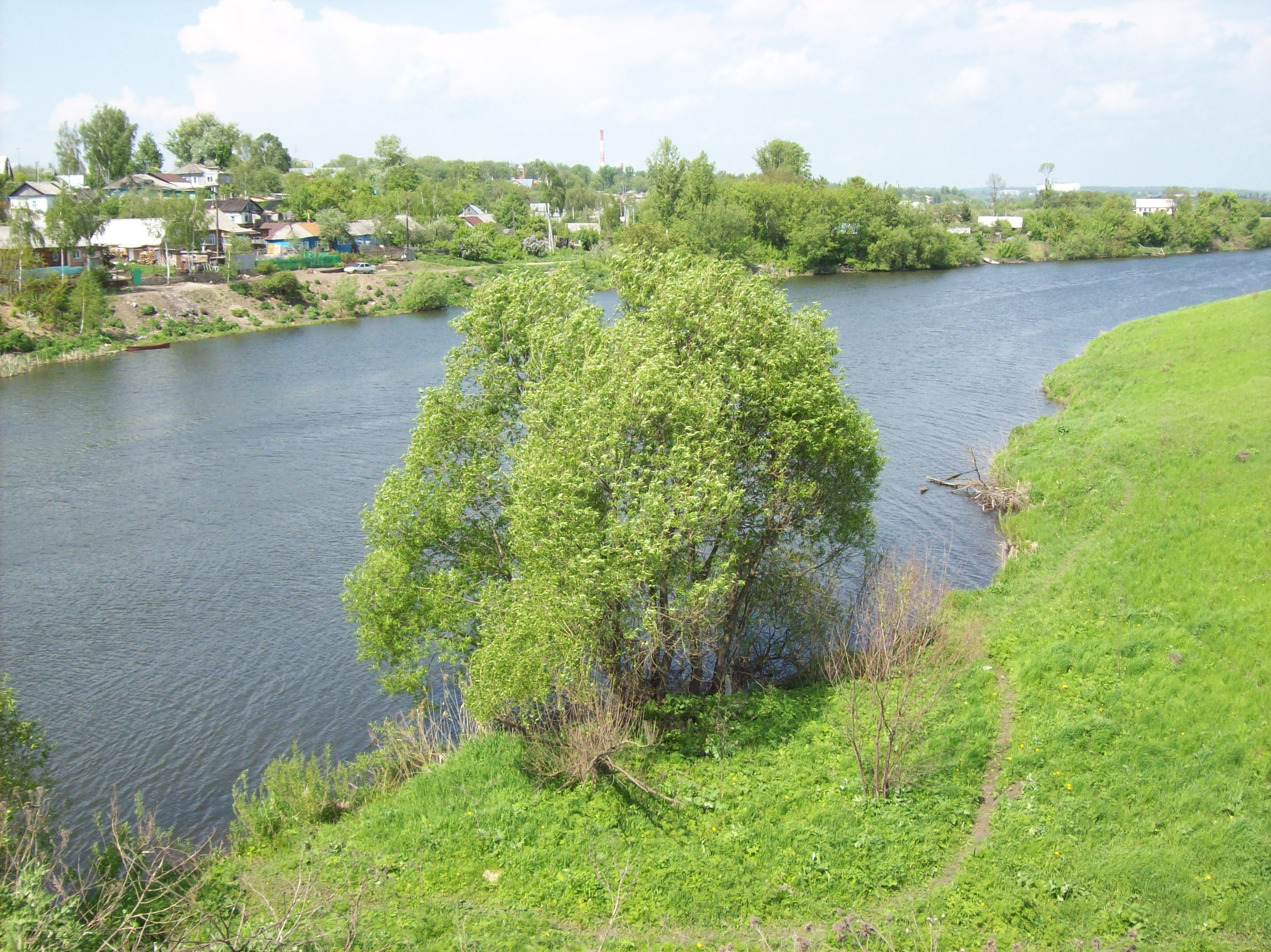
- Native name: Красивая меча (Russian)

Location
- Country: Russia

Physical characteristics
- Mouth: Don
  - coordinates: 52°55′19″N 39°02′53″E
- Length: 244 km (152 mi)
- Basin size: 6,000 km^{2} (2,300 sq mi)

Basin features
- Progression: Don→ Sea of Azov

Krasivaya Mecha (Russian: Краси́вая Ме́ча) is a river in Tula and Lipetsk oblasts in Russia. It is a right tributary of the Don, and is 244 kilometres (152 mi) long, with a drainage basin of 6,000 square kilometres (2,300 mi^{2}). The river freezes over in late November and is icebound until early April.

The town of Yefremov is along the Krasivaya Mecha River.

In his Sketches from a Hunter's Album, Russian writer Ivan Turgenev describes the area surrounding the river as the "Beautiful Lands," in reference to it being regarded as "one of the most beautiful regions in European Russia," according to the endnotes provided by Richard Freeborn for the English translation.
