= Zadonshchina =

14th-century literary work

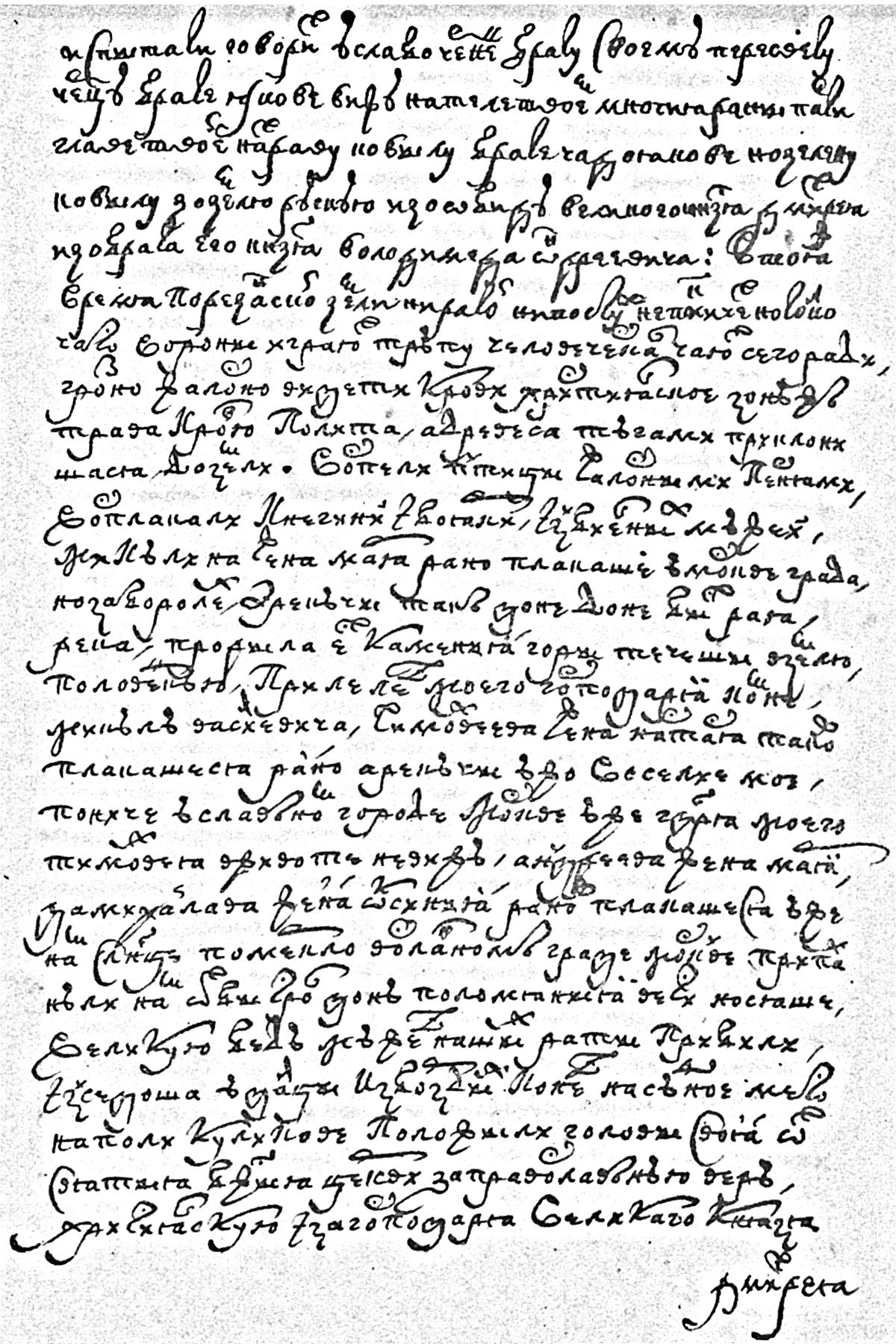
- Author: Attributed to Sofonii (Sofony) of Riazan
- Original title: Задонщина
- Translator: Serge Zenkovsky
- Language: Old Russian
- Genre: Military tale
- Publication date: end of 14th century
- Publication place: Russia

Zadonshchina (Russian: Задонщина; could be translated as "the region beyond the Don River") is a Russian literary monument of the late 14th century, which tells of the Battle of Kulikovo in 1380.

== The text ==
=== Redactions and the Prototext ===
Zadonshina exists in 2 redactions:

- Short redaction in one extant copy from Kirillo-Belozersky Monastery (KB) copied by the monk Efrosin (Russian: Ефросин). Possibly he himself abridged the tale; The second part of the battle is not described in this version. This is the oldest extant copy. It dates back to the end of the 15th century.
- Expanded redaction in three major extant and two incomplete copies. The major copies are: the Synodal copy, Undolsky’s copy and the copy of the State History Museum (Museum). Undolsky’s copy and the Museum copy stem from the same prototext. Undolsky’s copy is the most complete, however this one as well as all others have many mistakes, pointing at the insufficient understanding of the text by the copiers.

It is not clear what the original text was. Some scholars assert that the extant copies do not all go back to the same prototext. Many publications of Zadonshchina were composed by adding up excerpts from different copies.

=== Date of creation ===
Some Russian historians, including Mikhail Tikhomirov, believe that Zadonshchina was written between 1383 and 1393. Some manuscripts mention that 160 years had passed since the Battle of the Kalka River, which happened in 1223. At the same time, there is a mention of a Bulgarian city Tyrnov (contemporary Veliko Tarnovo), which in 1393 was taken by the Turks and could not be mentioned as Orthodox until the 19th century.

=== Authorship ===
One of the hypotheses is that the author of Zadonshchina was a certain Sofonii (Russian: Софоний) from Ryazan’. His name as the author of the text is mentioned in the KB copy and in the Synodal copy. Sofonii was probably one of the courtsmen of Volodimir Ondreevich, a cousin of Dmitry Ivanovich, the protagonist of Zadonshchina. Soviet/Russian textological research has shown that Sofonii is alluded to in all other copies of Zadonshchina as an author of a preceding work about the Battle of Kulikovo and hence is not the author of the text in question, but rather of a prototext on this subject, and that the actual author of Zadonshchina used that text in creating his work.

=== Composition ===
The text can poetically and thematically be divided into 3 parts:

- introduction (references to the past, historical background)
- “lament” (gathering of the hosts, 1st battle and the defeat, wives lamenting their fallen husbands)
- “praise” (second battle and praise to the princes)

== Contents and message ==
Zadonshchina presents a detailed description of the Battle of Kulikovo against the Tatars led by Mamai. The leader of the Muscovy hosts was prince Dmitry Ivanovich (entered in history as Dmitry Donskoy, Дмитрий Донской). The story propagates the importance of the unification of Russian principalities in order to defeat the common enemy – the Golden Horde. This epic also reflects the rise of the Moscow principality and stresses that the Muscovy princes were successors to the Kievan princes. It also crafted a proto-national myth about the need for unification against foreign enemies: "Let us lay down our lives for the Russian land and the Christian faith".

== Zadonshchina and The Tale of Igor's Campaign ==
A French Slavist André Mazon and later a Soviet historian Aleksandr Zimin proposed that The Tale of Igor's Campaign was written based on poetic images and ideas from Zadonshchina. They proposed that The Tale of Igor's Campaign was not an Old Russian text, but an 18th-century forgery. This approach is criticized by linguists, notably Roman Jakobson and Andrey Zaliznyak who show that the language of the Tale is far more archaic, and that the passages in Zadonshchina allegedly borrowed from the Tale differ from the rest of the work by linguistic criteria (whereas in the Tale no such distinction can be drawn).

== Translation ==
The English translation can be found in Medieval Russia's Epics, Chronicles and Tales by S. Zenskovsky (New York: Meridian, 1974).

== Other sources on the Battle of Kulikovo ==
1. Chronicles (Simeonovskaya, Novgorodskaya, Sofiyskaya)

2. The Word of Mamay's Defeat (Russian: Сказание о Мамаевом побоище, Skazaniie o Mamaevom poboishche)

3. The Word on the Life and Death of Dmitry Ivanovich (Слово о житии и преставлении Дмитрия Ивановича, Slovo o zhitii i o prestavlenii Dmitriia Ivanovicha)
