= Military history of Sweden =

Swedish military history encompasses the military engagements and strategic developments of Sweden from prehistoric times to the present day. As a significant European power during the 17th and early 18th centuries, Sweden played a major role in shaping the political landscape of Northern Europe. The country's military history is marked by periods of expansionism, particularly during the Swedish Empire era, followed by a long-standing policy of armed neutrality. Key phases include the Viking Age, the rise of the Swedish Empire, involvement in the Thirty Years' War, the Great Northern War, and more recent participation in United Nations peacekeeping operations. Sweden's military strategies have evolved from aggressive expansion to a focus on territorial defense and international cooperation, reflecting changes in its geopolitical position and global security landscape. Despite maintaining official neutrality through both World Wars, Sweden has continued to adapt its military capabilities and policies in response to regional and global security challenges, including its recent decision to join NATO in response to changing European security dynamics.

== Prehistoric Sweden and the Viking Age ==
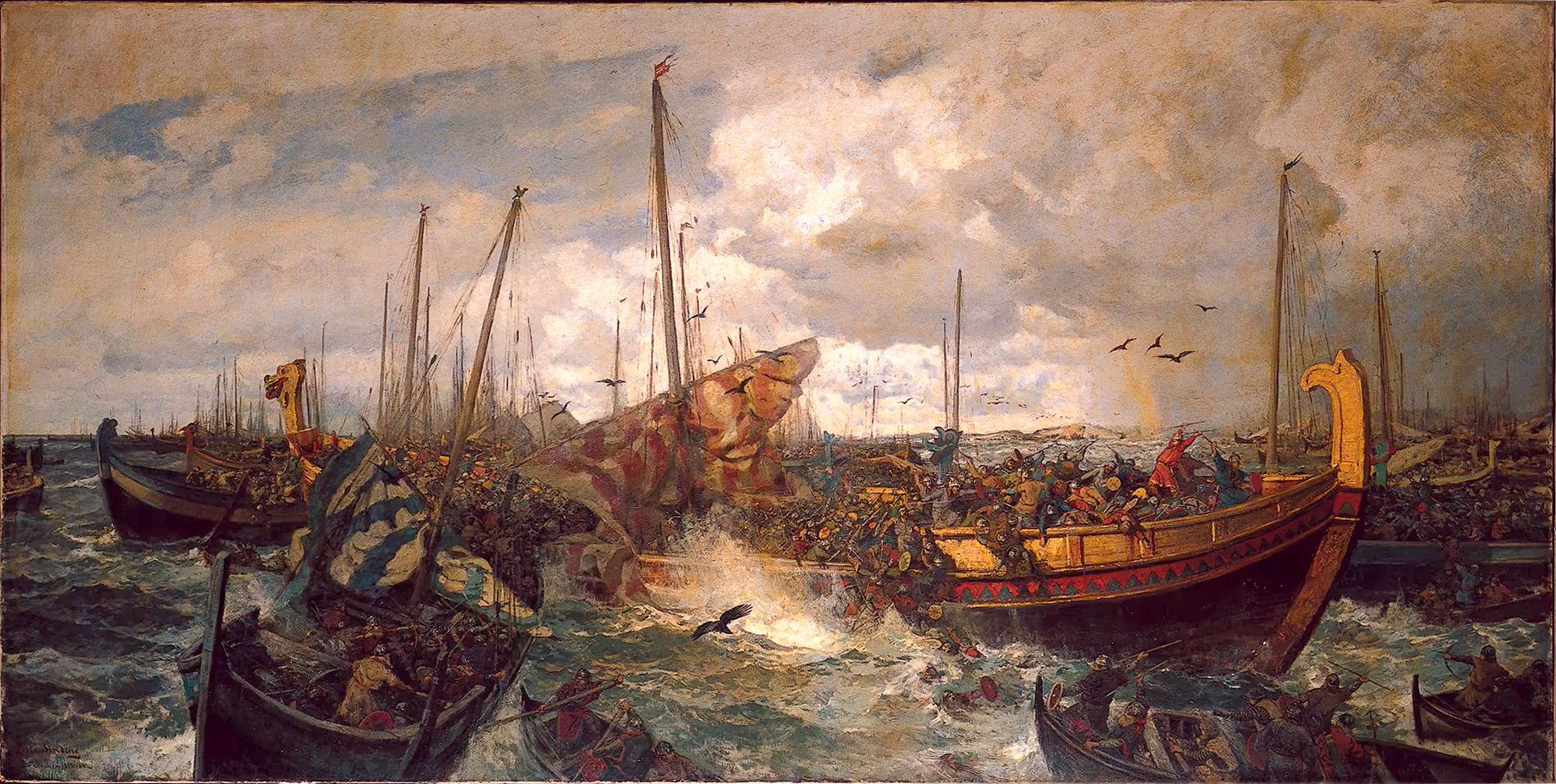
The Battle of Svolder was a naval battle in the 10th century that resulted in the partition of Norway between Denmark and Sweden.

During prehistoric times, Sweden was divided into two kingdoms: Svea and Göta. There were many wars fought between these kingdoms and eventually the Svea won. The Icelandic sagas tell of many family feuds as well, one can assume that these were common in Sweden also, as the structure of society was similar.

During the Early Middle Ages, many Vikings took recruitment in the fleet and participated both in trade and in plundering raids. The system of Leidang was used to organize the armies in the different parts of the country. In an alliance with the Danes, the Swedish king Olof Skötkonung won the war against the Norwegians at the battle of Svolder.

== Middle Ages ==
The Russo-Swedish War (1495–97) was a result of an alliance between Ivan III of Russia and Hans of Denmark, who was waging war against the Sture family of Sweden in the hope of regaining the Swedish throne. Ivan III sent Princes Daniil Shchenya and Vasily Shuisky to lay siege to the Swedish castle of Vyborg. The siege lasted for three months and ended when a castellan set his supply of powder on fire, thus "scaring the Muscovites out of their wits", as the Swedish records say. The following year Russian generals Vasily Kosoy and Andrey Chelyadnin severely devastated Swedish Finland as far as Hämeenlinna (Tavastehus). Another detachment sailed along the shore, forcing the Finns into subservience.

Sten Sture the Elder, who was then at Turku (Åbo), was enraged at the news of the Russian expedition and sent Svante Nilsson with 2,000 men to take Ivangorod, a new fortress which Ivan III had built to protect Russian Ingria against Livonian Knights. The fortress was taken but was impossible to defend it for a considerable period of time — Svante Nilsson proposed to hand it over to the Knights, an offer which they declined. Thereupon the Swedes set the fortress ablaze and sailed home. After the Swedish throne fell to Hans of Denmark, hostilities were suspended until 1508, when Sweden and Russia ratified a peace treaty for 60 years. Sweden and Russia would fight many wars in the following centuries (see Russo-Swedish Wars)

== The Early Vasa era ==
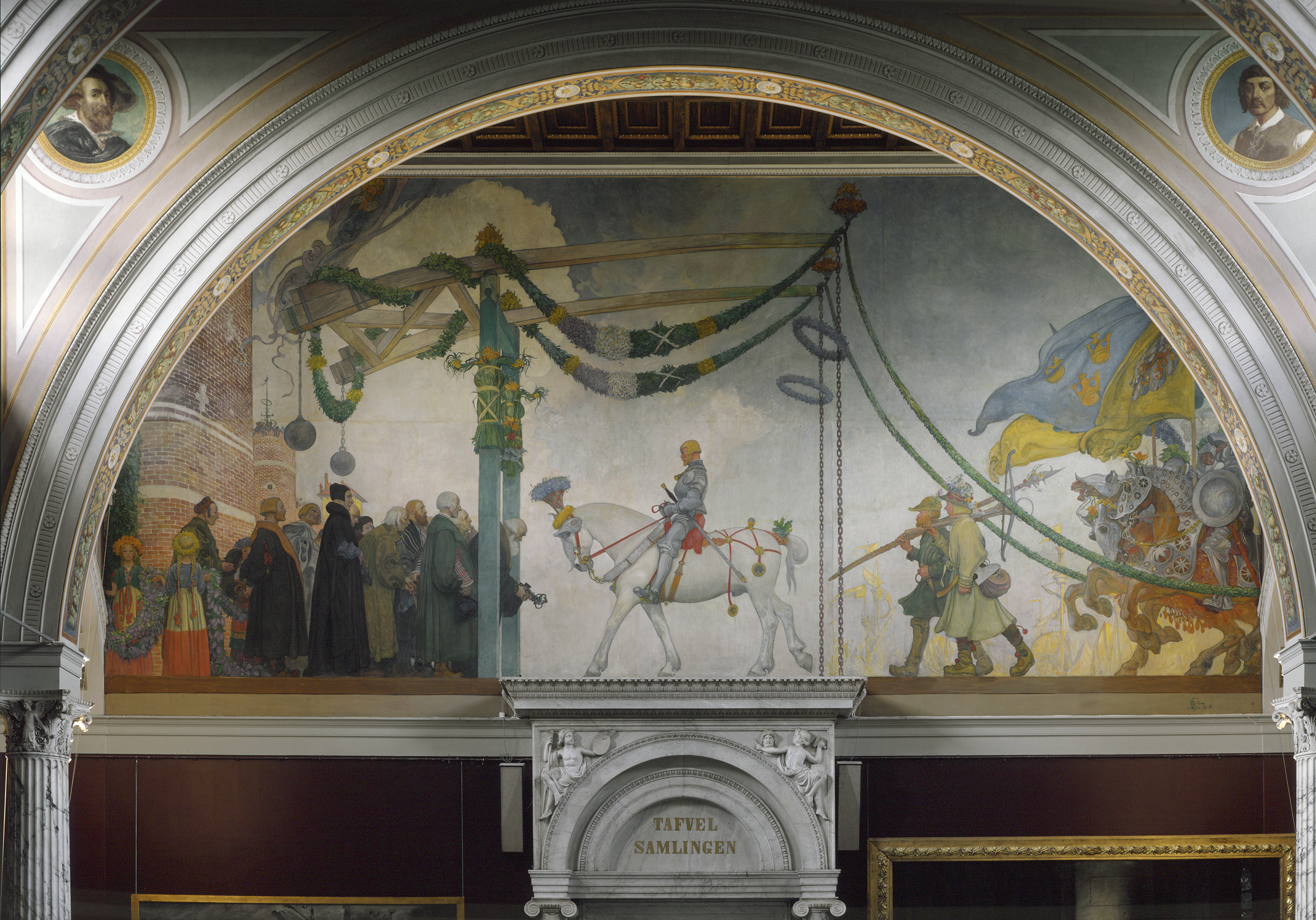
A 1908 painting of Gustav Vasa's entry into Stockholm shortly after the conquest of Stockholm in 1523.

=== Swedish War of Liberation ===
The Swedish War of Liberation (1521–1523) was a civil war in which the Swedish nobleman Gustav Vasa successfully deposed king Kristian II, as regent of the Kalmar Union in Sweden.

=== The De la Gardie Campaign ===
The De la Gardie Campaign refers to the actions of a 15,000-strong military unit commanded by Jacob De la Gardie in alliance with the Russian commander Mikhail Skopin-Shuisky against the Polish–Lithuanian Commonwealth in the Polish–Muscovite War (1605–18). The campaign was a result of an alliance between Charles IX of Sweden and Vasili IV of Russia, whereby the latter promised to cede the County of Kexholm to Sweden vs Estonia 1655.

The combined Russo-Swedish forces set out from Novgorod late in 1609 and marched towards Moscow, relieving the Siege of Troitse-Sergiyeva Lavra on their way. They dispersed the supporters of False Dmitry II, who maintained an alternative court in Tushino near Moscow and challenged the authority of Vasily IV. In the aftermath, some of the Tushino boyars summoned Wladyslaw IV to lay his claim to the Russian throne, while Skopin-Shuisky was poisoned at the behest of his uncle and rival, Prince Dmitry Shuisky.

In June 1610, De la Gardie and Dmitry Shuisky departed from Moscow in order to lift Żółkiewski's Siege of Smolensk. The campaign ended with most of De la Gardie's forces being destroyed by the Polish hetman Stanisław Żółkiewski at the Battle of Klushino in 1610. The De la Gardie Campaign can be considered a prelude to the Ingrian War.

=== The Ingrian War ===
The Ingrian War between Sweden and Russia, which lasted between 1610 and 1617 and can be seen as part of the Time of Troubles, is mainly remembered for the attempt to put a Swedish duke on the Russian throne. It ended with a large Swedish territorial gain in the Treaty of Stolbovo which laid an important foundation to Sweden's Age of Greatness.

=== The Kalmar War ===
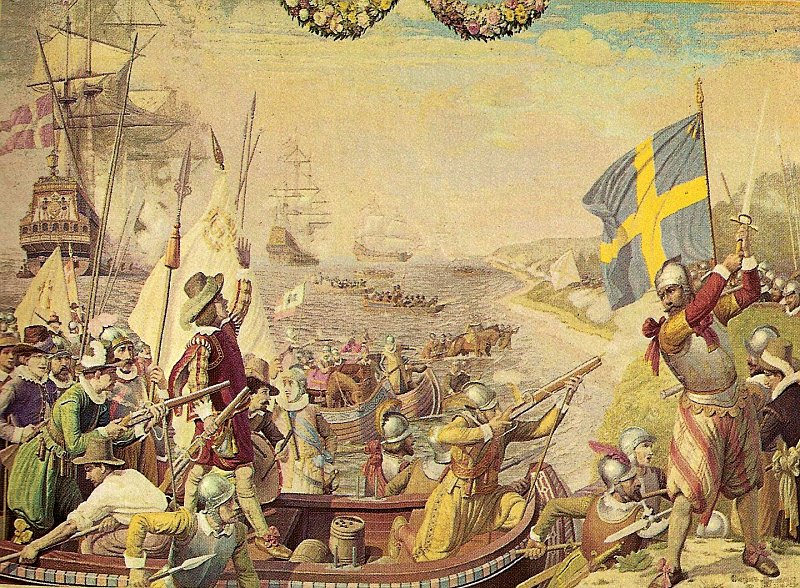
Depiction of the Kalmar War. The conflict, lasting from 1611 to 1613, was fought between Denmark–Norway and the Kingdom of Sweden.

The Kalmar War was a war between Sweden and Denmark 1611 to 1613. Sweden sought an alternative trade route to avoid paying Denmark's Sound Toll through Northern Norway. This was not to Denmark's liking and they invaded southern Sweden. England and the Netherlands were also invested in the Baltic Sea trade, and pressured to curtail Denmark's power by ending the Kalmar War before a decisive victory could be attained. The Danes, while well-equipped and strong, had relied heavily on mercenary forces and Christian IV, low on funds, was finally amenable to persuasion in 1613. With England's intercession, the Treaty of Knäred was signed on 20 January 1613.

Denmark reached its victory, restoring Norwegian control of Sweden's land route through Lapland by incorporating Sámi Lapland into Norway (and thus under Danish rule). Further, Sweden had to pay a high ransom for two fortresses captured by Denmark. Sweden, however, achieved a major concession — the right of free trade through the Sound Strait, becoming exempt of the Sound toll (a right shared by England and Holland).

=== Polish–Swedish Wars ===
The Polish–Swedish wars were a series of wars between the Polish–Lithuanian Commonwealth and Sweden, in the wider meaning to the series of wars in which both Sweden and the Polish–Lithuanian Commonwealth participated between 1563 and 1721, in the narrower meaning denoting the two wars between 1600 and 1629.

== The Swedish Empire era ==
=== The Thirty Years' War ===
Although the Battle of Lützen was a Swedish victory, Gustavus Adolphus, the King of Sweden, was killed.

The Thirty Years' War was fought between 1618 and 1648, principally on the territory of today's Germany, and involved most of the major European continental powers, including Sweden. Although it was from the outset a religious conflict between Protestants and Catholics, the rivalry between the Habsburg dynasty and other powers was also a central motive.

Sweden held, for a time, control of the principal trade routes of the Baltic; and the increment of revenue resulting from this commanding position was of material assistance during the earlier stages of the war in Germany, whither the Swedish king Gustavus II Adolphus transferred his forces in June 1630. Gustavus, later to be called "the Lion of the North" due to his skills as a commander, intervened on the Protestant side in the German civil war. Using new military techniques such as lighter and more mobile artillery, a larger proportion of his infantry using firearms (as opposed to pikes), and cavalry shock tactics, he won a crushing victory at the Battle of Breitenfeld in 1631. In the Battle of Lützen on 6 November 1632 he rode into a group of enemy cavalry and was killed. The battle itself was a draw. Two years later Imperial troops won a convincing victory over the Protestant Army at Nördlingen. In order to prevent the Habsburg's from winning the war, France, who had already given major financial subsidies to Sweden, intervened on the Protestant side. The war dragged on for many years until a peace agreement was at last reached in 1648. In the Peace of Westphalia Sweden received an indemnity, as well as control of Western Pomerania and the bishoprics of Bremen and Verden. It thus won control of the mouth of the Oder, Elbe, and Weser Rivers, and acquired three voices in the Council of Princes of the German Reichstag.

=== The Torstenson War ===
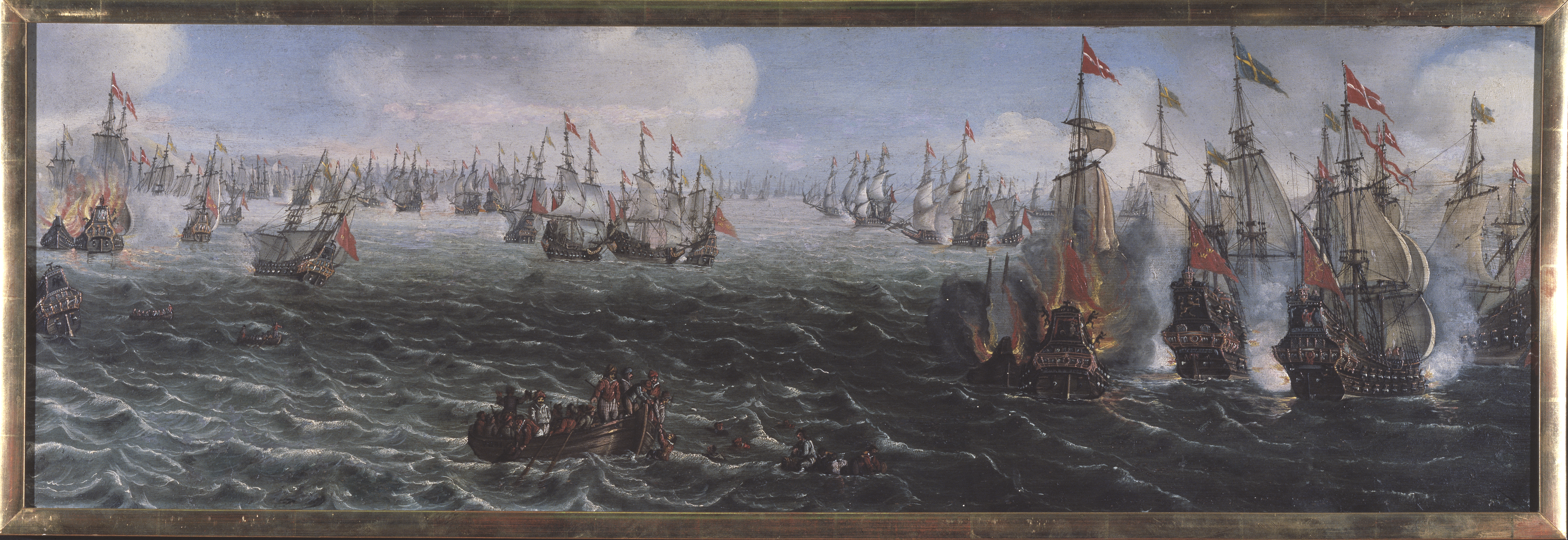
The Battle of Fehmarn in 1644, was a decisive victory for the Swedish Navy during the Torstenson War.

The Torstenson war was a short period of conflict between Sweden and Denmark/Norway which occurred in 1643 to 1645 during the waning days of the Thirty Years' War. It was named after Lennart Torstenson.

=== Dutch-Swedish War ===
The Dano-Swedish War (1658–1660), was a Dutch intervention in the Northern Wars, in which Sweden tried to extend its control over the Baltic Sea.

=== Charles X's wars ===
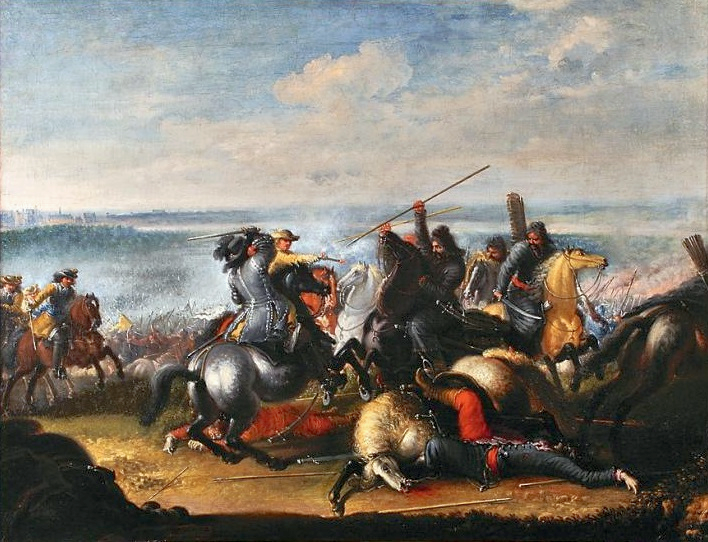
Swedish king Charles X Gustav in skirmish with Polish Tartars during the Battle of Warsaw, 1656.

Sweden attacked Poland in 1655. The goal was to gain full control over the Baltic Sea. During the two first years, Swedish troops occupied large parts of Poland and the war was almost won. In 1656, Sweden won the battle of Warsaw, but the Polish resistance hardened and the farmers began fighting a guerrilla war against the Swedes.

The war did not go well, and in the autumn of 1657, Denmark-Norway declared war against Sweden. Charles X took then the army and marched north. In October, the Swedes conquered Frederiksodde and on 30 January the Swedish army crossed the Little Belt; on 5–6 February they crossed the Great Belt, one of the biggest feats of the Swedish army. Denmark-Norway surrendered and handed over the Danish provinces of Blekinge, Bornholm, Halland and Scania as well as the Norwegian provinces of Trondheim and Båhuslen after the Treaty of Roskilde.

Wanting to follow up his victory, Charles X attacked Copenhagen in 1659, but was forced to withdraw because of the strong Danish defence and support from the Dutch navy. Norwegian forces succeeded in reconquering the province of Trondheim. The 1660 Treaty of Copenhagen restored Trondheim to Norway and Bornholm to Denmark.

=== The Scanian War ===
The Scanian War was fought between the union of Denmark–Norway and Sweden from 1675–1679. The war was prompted by the Swedish involvement in the Franco-Dutch War. Sweden had allied with France against several European countries. The United Provinces, under attack by France, sought support from Denmark-Norway.

The Danish objective was to retrieve the Scanian lands that had been given to Sweden after the Northern Wars. Although the Danish offensive was initially a great success, Swedish counter-offensives nullified much of the gain. The most important battle was fought at Battle of Lund were Swedish forces won a costly victory, this was a turningpoint in the war for Sweden. Eventually, a French-dictated peace was negotiated stipulating that all territory lost by Sweden be returned.

=== Great Northern War ===
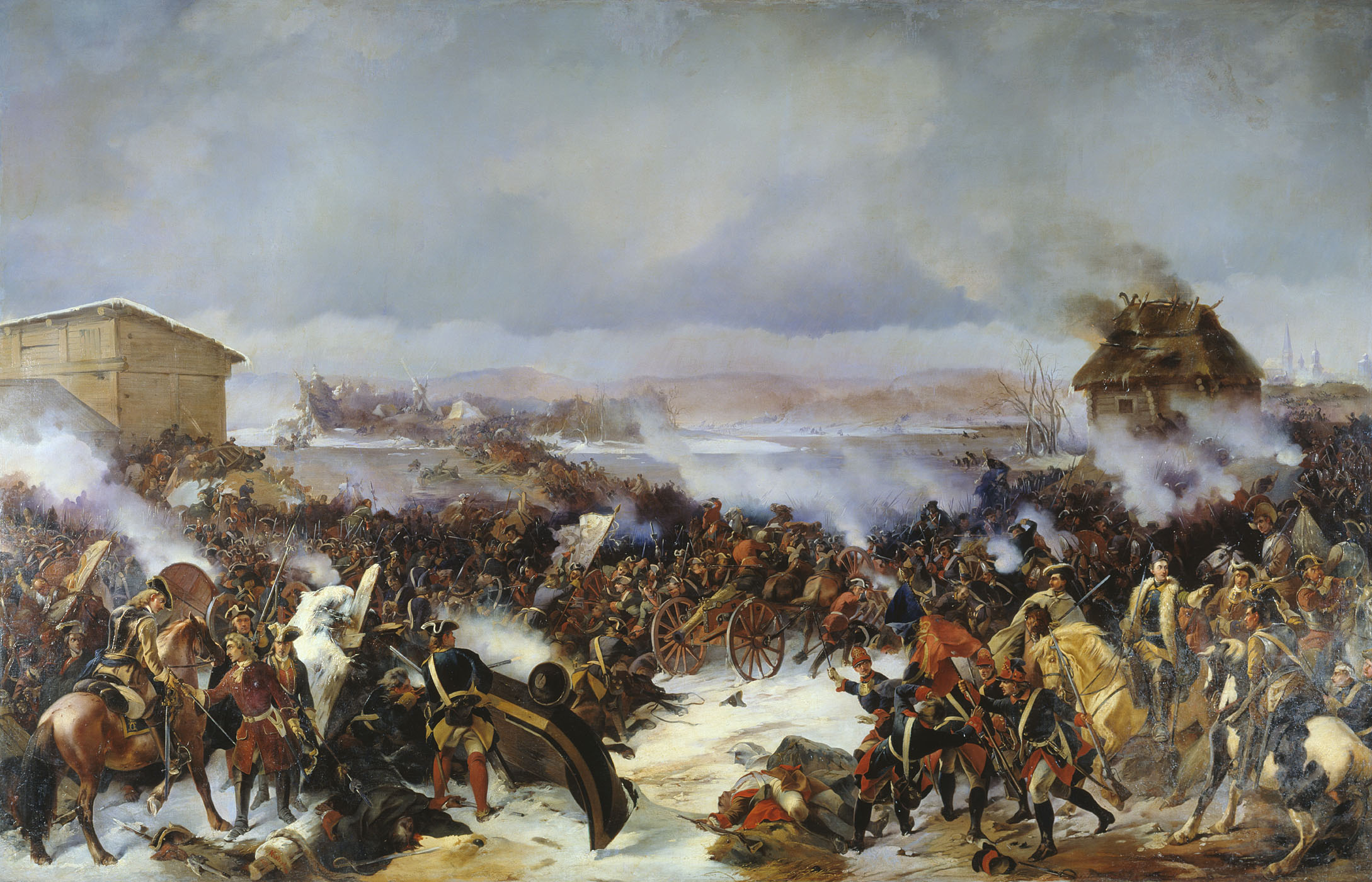
Depiction of the Battle of Narva, 1700. An early battle of the Great Northern War, The battle saw Russian forces surrender to a Swedish Army a quarter of its size.

The Great Northern War took place between 1700 and 1721. It was fought between a coalition of Russia, Denmark–Norway, and Saxony (also the Polish–Lithuanian Commonwealth, from 1701, and Prussia and Hanover from 1715) and Sweden, which was helped by the Ottoman Empire and monetary subsidized by France.

The war began as a coordinated attack on Sweden, ruled by the young Charles XII, by the coalition in 1700 and ended in 1721 with the Treaty of Nystad and the Stockholm treaties. Despite spectacular early Swedish victories, the ultimate result of the war was the end of the Swedish Empire. Russia supplanted Sweden as the dominant Power on the Baltic Sea and became a major player in European politics.

== The Age of Liberty ==
=== Hats and Caps ===
The policy of the Hats was a return to the traditional alliance between France and Sweden. When Sweden descended to a position of a second-rate power the French - alliance became too costly a luxury. Horn had clearly perceived this; and his cautious neutrality was therefore the soundest statesmanship. But the politicians who had ousted Horn thought differently. To them prosperity without glory was a worthless possession. They aimed at restoring Sweden to her former position as a great power. France, naturally, hailed with satisfaction the rise of a faction which was content to be her armourbearer in the north; and the golden streams which flowed from Versailles to Stockholm during the next two generations were the political life-blood of the Hat party.

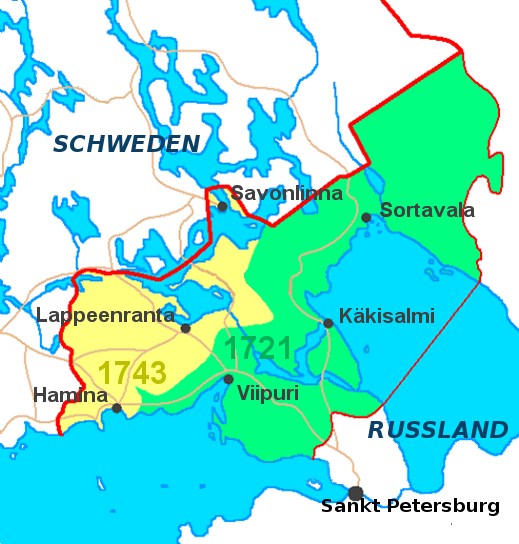
Map of Old Finland. Sweden ceded the territories in yellow to the Russian Empire following the Hat's War in 1743.

The first blunder of the Hats was the hasty and ill-advised war with Russia. The European complications consequent with upon the almost simultaneous deaths of Charles VI, Holy Roman Emperor and Empress Anne of Russia, seemed to favour their adventurous schemes; and, despite the frantic protests of the Cap, a project for the invasion of Russian Finland was rushed through the premature Riksdag of 1740. On 20 July 1741 war was formally declared against Russia; a month later the Diet was dissolved and the lantmarskalk set off to Finland to take command of the army.

The first blow was not struck until six months after the declaration of war; and it was struck by the enemy, who routed the Swedes at Lappeenranta and captured that frontier fortress. Nothing else was done on either side for six months more; and then the Swedish generals made a "tacit truce" with the Russians through the mediation of the French ambassador at St. Petersburg. By the time that the "tacit truce" had come to an end the Swedish forces were so demoralized that the mere rumour of a hostile attack made them retire panic-stricken to Helsinki; and before the end of the year all Finland was in the hands of the Russians. The fleet, disabled by an epidemic, was, throughout the war, little more than a floating hospital.

To face the Riksdag with such a war as this upon their consciences was a trial from which the Hats naturally shrank; but to do them justice, they showed themselves better parliamentary than military strategists. A motion for an inquiry into the conduct of the war was skilfully evaded by obtaining precedence for the succession question Queen Ulrike Eleonora of Sweden had lately died childless and King Frederick was old; and negotiations were thus opened with the new Russian empress, Elizabeth of Russia, who agreed to restore the greater part of Finland if her cousin, Adolph Frederick of Holstein, were elected successor to the Swedish crown. The Hats eagerly caught at the opportunity of recovering the lost lands and their own prestige along with it. By the Treaty of Åbo, on 7 May 1743, the terms of the empress were accepted and only that small part of Finland which lay beyond the Kymi river was retained by Russia. In March 1751 the old King Frederick died. His slender prerogatives had gradually dwindled down to vanishing point.

=== The Pomeranian War ===
King Adolf Frederick of Sweden (1751–1771) would have given even less trouble than his predecessor but for the ambitious promptings of his masterful consort Louisa Ulrika, Frederick the Great's sister, and the tyranny of the estates, who seemed bent upon driving the meekest of princes into rebellion. An attempted monarchical revolution, planned by the queen and a few devoted young nobles in 1756, was easily and remorselessly crushed; and, though the unhappy king did not, as he anticipated, share the fate of Charles Stuart, he was humiliated as never monarch was humiliated before.

The same years which beheld this great domestic triumph of the Hats saw also the utter collapse of their foreign "system." At the instigation of France they plunged recklessly into the Seven Years' War; and the result was ruinous. The French subsidies, which might have sufficed for a six weeks demonstration (it was generally assumed that the king of Prussia would give little trouble to a European coalition), proved quite inadequate; and, after five unsuccessful campaigns, the unhappy Hats were glad to make peace and ignominiously withdraw from a little war which had cost the country 40,000 men. When the Riksdag met in 1760, the indignation against the Hat leaders was so violent that an impeachment seemed inevitable; but once more the superiority of their parliamentary tactics prevailed, and when, after a session of twenty months, the Riksdag was brought to a close by the mutual consent of both the exhausted factions, the Hat government was bolstered up for another four years. But the day of reckoning could not be postponed forever; and when the estates met in 1765 it brought the Caps into power at last. Their leader, Ture Rudbeck, was elected marshal of the Diet over Frederick Axel von Fersen, the Hat candidate, by a large majority; and, out of the hundred seats in the secret committee, the Hats succeeded in getting only ten.

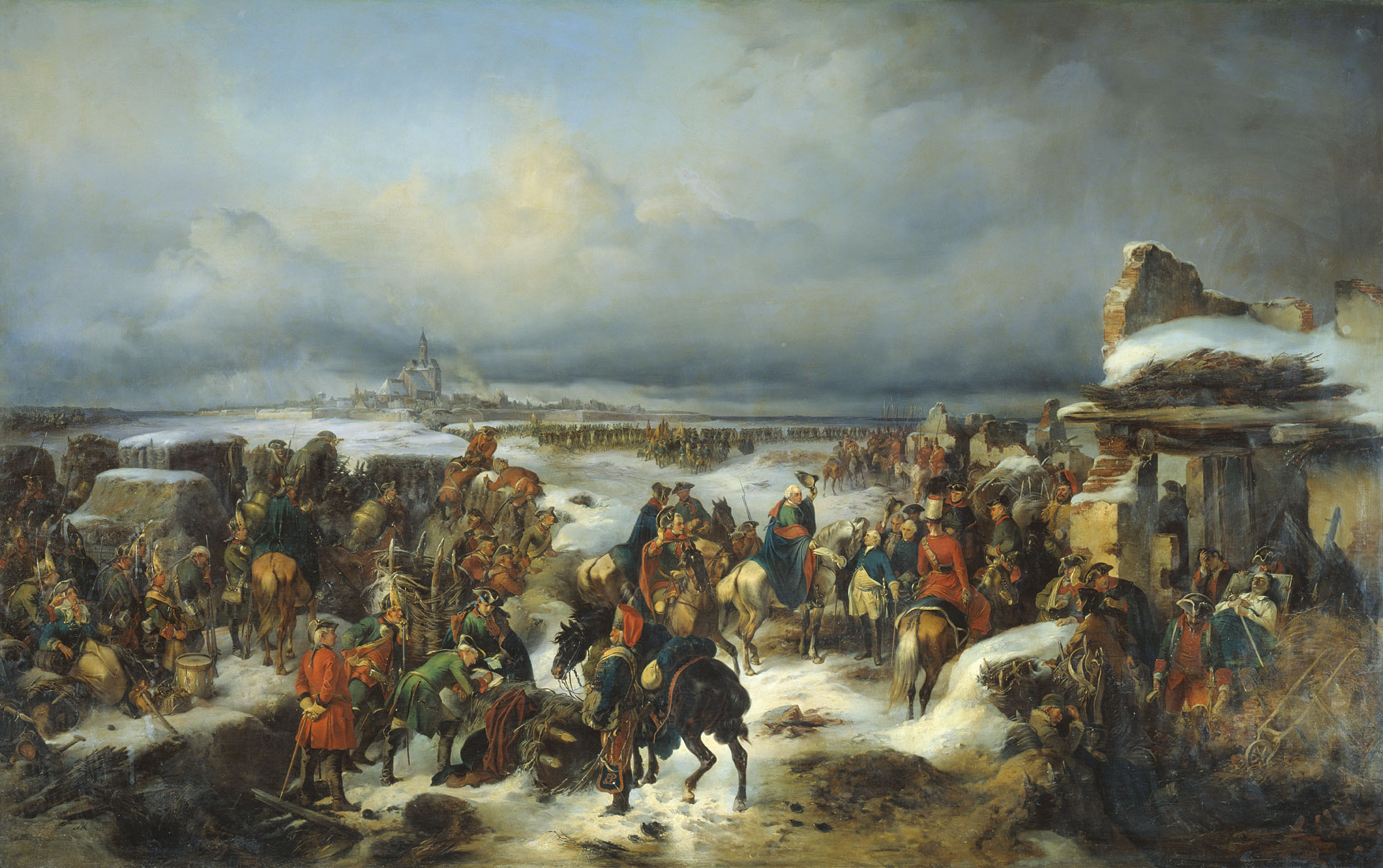
Depiction of the fall of Kolberg shortly after the third siege of the city in 1761. Two Swedish regiments supported the Russian siege of city.

The Caps struck at once at the weak point of their opponents by ordering a budget report to be made; and it was speedily found that the whole financial system of the Hats had been based upon reckless improvidence and the wilful misrepresentation, and that the only fruit of their long rule was an enormous addition to the national debt and a depreciation of the note circulation to one third of its face value. This revelation led to an all-round retrenchment, carried into effect with a drastic thoroughness which has earned for this parliament the name of the "Reduction Riksdag". The Caps succeeded in reducing the national debt, half of which was transferred from the pockets of the rich to the empty exchequer, and establishing some sort of equilibrium between revenue and expenditure. They also introduced a few useful reforms, the most remarkable of which was the liberty of the press in 1766. But their most important political act was to throw their lot definitely in with Russia, so as to counterpoise the influence of France.

Although no longer a great power, Sweden still had many of the responsibilities of a great power; and even if the Swedish alliance with France had weakened, it was still in place. Sweden's geographical position made it invulnerable for half the year, her Pomeranian acted as a gateway to the Holy Roman Empire, while the Finnish frontier was not far from the Saint Petersburg.

A watchful neutrality, not venturing much beyond defensive alliances and commercial treaties with the maritime powers, was therefore Sweden's safest policy, and this the older Caps had always followed out. But when the Hats became the armourbearers of France in the north, a protector strong enough to counteract French influence became the cardinal exigency of their opponents, the younger Caps, who now flung themselves into the arms of Russia, overlooking the fact that even a pacific union with Russia was more to be feared than a martial alliance with France. For France was too distant to be dangerous. She sought an ally in Sweden and it was her endeavour to make that ally as strong as possible. But it was as a future prey, not as a possible ally, that Russia regarded her ancient rival in the north. In the treaty which partitioned Poland there was a secret clause which engaged the contracting powers to uphold the existing Swedish constitution as the swiftest means of subverting Swedish independence; and an alliance with the credulous Caps, "the Patriots" as they were called at St. Petersburg, guaranteeing their constitution, was the corollary to this secret understanding. Thus, while the French alliance of the warlike Hats had destroyed the prestige of Sweden, the Russian alliance of the peaceful Caps threatened to destroy her very existence.

Fortunately, the domination of the Caps was not for long. The general distress occasioned by their drastic reforms had found expression in swarms of pamphlets which bit and stung the Cap government, under the protection of the new press laws. The senate retaliated by an order in council, which the king refused to sign declaring that all complaints against the measures of the last Riksdag should be punished with fine and imprisonment. The king, at the suggestion of the crown prince thereupon urged the senate to summon an extraordinary Riksdag as the speediest method of relieving the national distress, and, on their refusing to comply with his wishes, abdicated. From 15 to 21 December 1768 Sweden was without a regular government. Then the Cap senate gave way and the estates were convoked for 19 April 1769.

On the eve of the contest there was a general assembly of the Hats at the French embassy, where the Comte de Modêne furnished them with 6,000,000 livres, but not until they had signed in his presence an undertaking to reform the constitution in a monarchical sense. Still more energetic on the other side, the Russian minister, Andrey Osterman, became the treasurer as well as the counsellor of the Caps, and scattered the largesse of the Russian empress with a lavish hand; and so lost to all feeling of patriotism were the Caps that they openly threatened all who ventured to vote against them with the Muscovite vengeance, and fixed Norrköping, instead of Stockholm, as the place of meeting for the Riksdag as being more accessible to the Russian fleet. But it soon became evident that the Caps were playing a losing game; and, when the Riksdag met at Norrköping on 19 April, they found themselves in a minority in all four estates. In the contest for speaker of the Riksdag (Lantmarskalk) the leaders of the two parties were again pitted against each other, when the verdict of the last Diet was exactly reversed, von Fersen defeating Rudbeck by 234, though Russia spent no less a sum than 90,000 Riksdaler to secure the election of the latter.

The Caps had short shrift, and the joint note which the Russian, Prussian and Danish ministers presented to the estates protesting, in menacing terms, against any "reprisals" on the part of the triumphant faction, only hastened the fall of the government. The Cap senate resigned en masse to escape impeachment, and an exclusively Hat ministry took its place. On 1 June the "Reaction Riksdag", as it was generally called, removed to the capital; and it was now that the French ambassador and the crown prince Gustav called upon the new Privy Councillors to redeem their promise as to a reform of the constitution which they had made before the elections. Be it when, at the end of the session, they half-heartedly brought the matter forward, the Riksdag suddenly seemed to be stricken with paralysis. Impediments multiplied at every step; the cry was raised: "The constitution is in danger" and on 30 January 1770 the Reaction Riksdag, after a barren ten months session, rose amidst chaotic confusion without accomplishing anything.

== Gustavian times ==
=== Gustav III's Russian War ===
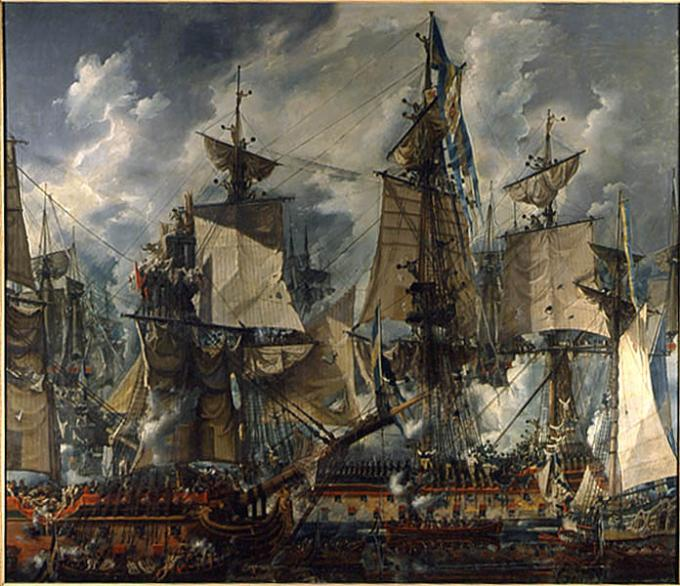
Contemporary painting of the Battle of Hogland, the first engagement of Russo-Swedish War of 1788–1790.

The Russo-Swedish War of 1788–90, known as Gustav III's Russian War in Sweden and as Catherine II's Swedish War in Russia, was fought between Sweden and Russia from June 1788 to August 1790.

The conflict was initiated by King Gustav III of Sweden for domestic political reasons, as he believed that a short war would leave the opposition no recourse but to support him. Despite establishing himself an autocrat in bloodless coup d'état that ended parliamentary rule in 1772, his political powers did not give him the right to start a war.

The Swedes initially planned a naval assault on St. Petersburg. One Swedish army was to advance through Finland; a second army, accompanied by the Swedish coastal flotilla, was to advance along the Finnish coast into the Gulf of Finland; while a third army sailed with the Swedish battlefleet in order to land at Oranienbaum to advance on St. Petersburg.

The Russian battlefleet under Samuel Greig met the Swedish fleet off Hogland Island in the Gulf of Finland on 17 July 1788, at the Battle of Hogland. The battle was tactically indecisive, but the Russians did enough to prevent the Swedish landing. As the war was deeply unpopular in Sweden and the Finnish officers were mutinous, news of the failure at Hogland triggered a revolt among some of the noble army officers, known as the League of Anjala.

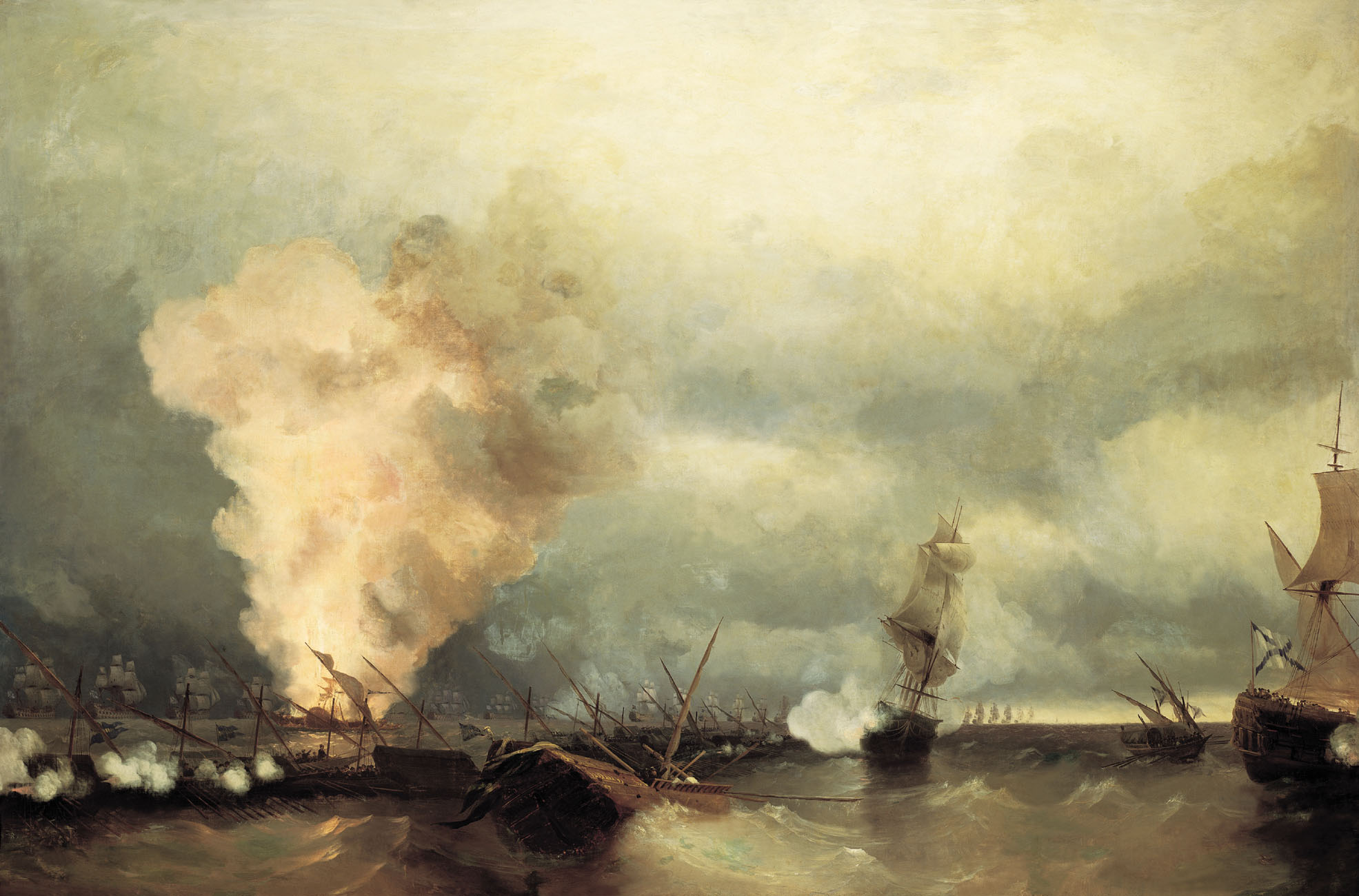
Although the Swedish Navy suffered heavy losses at the Battle of Vyborg Bay, the rest of the Swedish fleet was able to break through the Russian naval blockade.

The Swedish attack on Russia caused Denmark–Norway to declare war on Sweden in August in accordance with its treaty obligations to Russia. A Norwegian army briefly invaded Sweden and won the Battle of Kvistrum Bridge, before peace was signed on 9 July 1789 following the diplomatic intervention of Great Britain and Prussia. Under their pressure, Denmark-Norway declared itself neutral to the conflict, bringing this Lingonberry War to an end.

At sea, the two evenly matched battlefleets met again at the Battle of Öland on 25 July 1789, which was indecisive. A month later, on 24 August, the Russian Vice-Admiral Nassau-Siegen decisively defeated the Swedish coastal flotilla at the First Battle of Svensksund.

In 1790, King Gustav revived the plan for a landing close to St. Petersburg, this time near Vyborg. But the plan foundered in a disastrous attack on the Russian fleet at the Battle of Reval on 13 May. A further attack on the Russian fleet off Kronstadt at the beginning of June also failed and the Swedish battlefleet and galley flotilla both retired to Vyborg Bay, where the combined Swedish fleets of some 400 vessels were blockaded by Vasily Chichagov's Baltic Fleet for a month. On 3 July the Swedes forced their way out in the costly Battle of Vyborg Bay, losing six battleships and four frigates as a result.

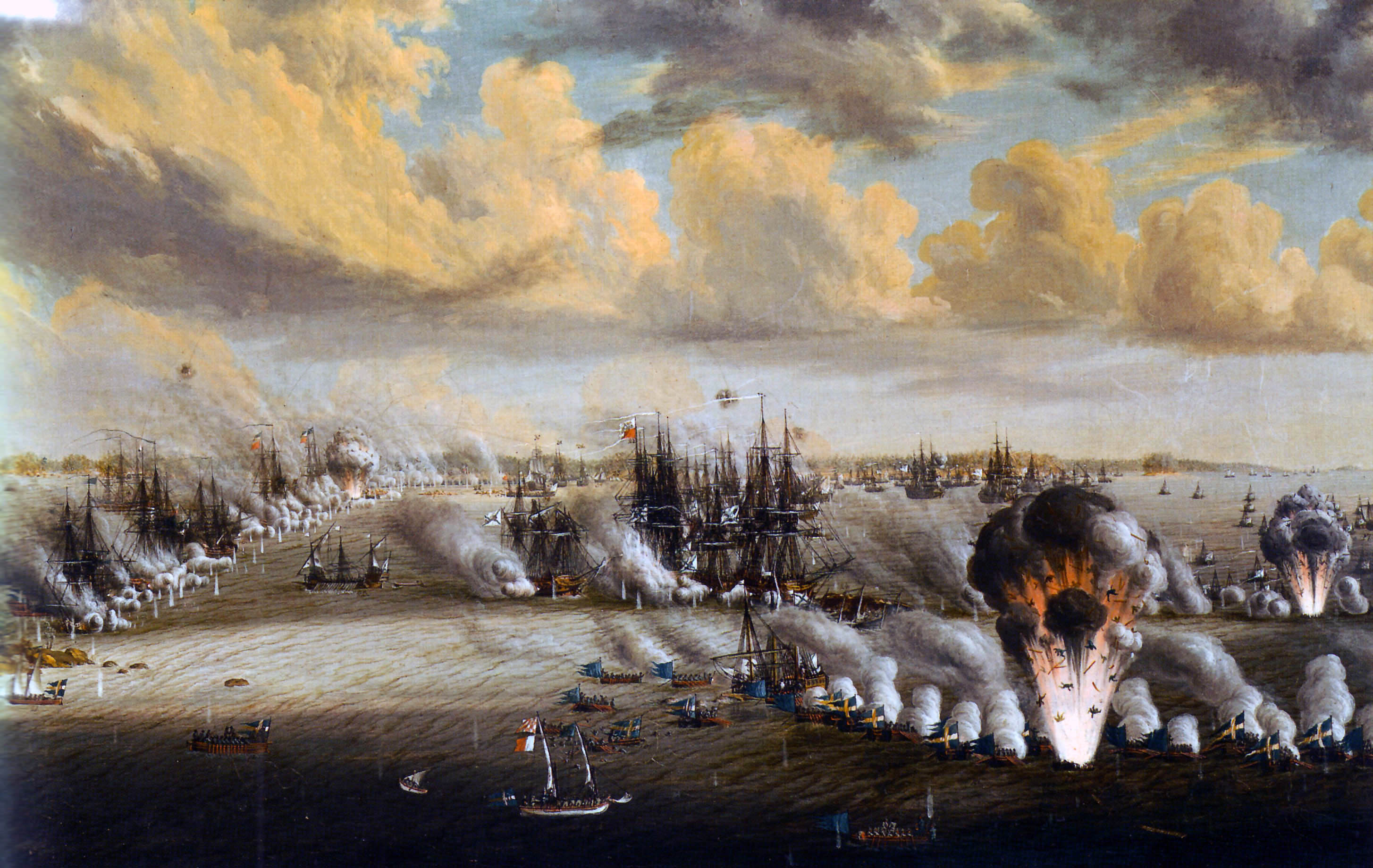
The Swedish Navy dealt the Russian fleet a devastating defeat in the Battle of Svensksund, resulting in the end of the war.

The Swedish battlefleet retired to Sveaborg for repairs while the Swedish galley flotilla made for a strong defensive position at Svenskrund. An impetuous Russian attack on the Swedish galley flotilla on 9 July at the Second Battle of Svensksund resulted in disaster for the Russians who lost some 9,500 out of 14,000 men and about one third of their flotilla. It was the greatest naval victory ever gained by Sweden and helped to pave the way for peace. The Russian Vice-Chancellor Alexander Bezborodko immediately agreed to negotiations, and the war was ended by the Treaty of Värälä on 14 August.

The Russo-Swedish War of 1788–1790 was, overall, mostly insignificant for the parties involved. Catherine II regarded the war against her Swedish cousin as a minor distraction, as her land troops were tied in the war against Turkey and she was likewise concerned with revolutionary events unfolding in Poland and in France. The war solved Gustav III's domestic problems only briefly, as he was assassinated at the Opera in Stockholm, in 1792.

=== The Finnish War ===
The Finnish War was fought between Sweden and Russia from February 1808 to September 1809. As a result of the war, the eastern third of Sweden was established as the semi-autonomous Grand Duchy of Finland, according to the Finns a personal union with Imperial Russia. Another notable effect was the Swedish parliament's adoption of a new constitution and a new royal house, that of Bernadotte.

== The Union era ==
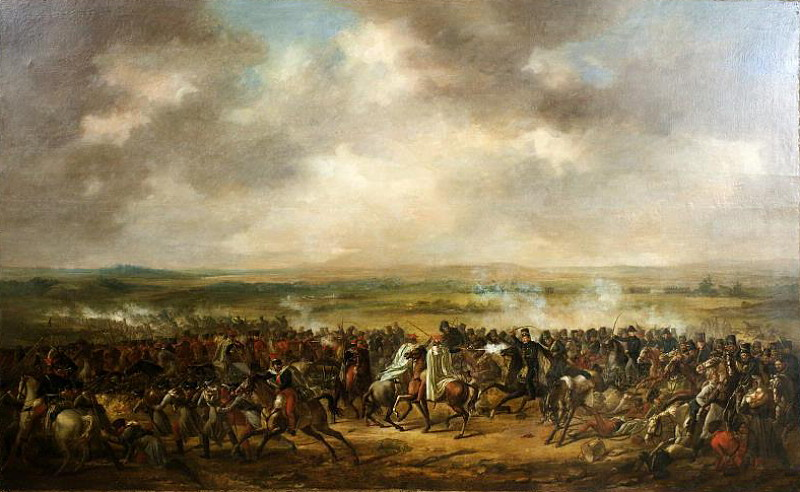
The Battle of Bornhöved was fought in 1813, during the War of the Sixth Coalition. The battle was the last time Swedish and Danish forces met on the battlefield.

=== The Napoleonic Wars ===
The Napoleonic Wars comprised a series of global conflicts fought during Napoleon Bonaparte's imperial rule over France (1805–1815). These wars were to some extent a continuation of the French Revolutionary Wars which followed on the French Revolution of 1789. Sweden was part of the Fourth Coalition, an alliance organized against Napoleon's French Empire in 1806–1807. Under the leadership of its new Crown Prince Charles John, formerly French Marshal Bernadotte, Sweden was a founding member of the Sixth Coalition and played a key role in the German Campaign of 1813. Bernadotte was the primary author of the Trachenberg Plan, the successful campaign plan for 1813, and commanding general of the 120,000 man Allied Army of the North. The principal battles involving Sweden include the Battle of Großbeeren, the Battle of Dennewitz and the Battle of Leipzig. Following the Allied victory at Leipzig, Charles John and the Swedes went on to wage a short, successful campaign in Denmark and Norway.

=== The Battle of Bornhöved ===
The Battle of Bornhöved was a battle between Sweden and Denmark on 7 December 1813 in Bornhöved in northern Germany. The Swedes were victorious and this was a first step in conquering Norway. This would be realized in the Treaty of Kiel of 1814.

=== War with Norway ===
According to the Treaty of Kiel, the king of Denmark–Norway ceded Norway to the king of Sweden. However, Norwegian resistance led to the restoration of Norwegian independence in 1814. Trying to enforce the provisions of the Kiel treaty, Sweden invaded Norway in July 1814. After two weeks, the superior strength of the Swedish army had forced the Norwegians to conclude the Convention of Moss on 14 August 1814. Norway kept its new constitution and formal independence, but had to accept a personal union with Sweden.

The peace with Norway at Moss concluded the last Swedish war.

== World War I ==
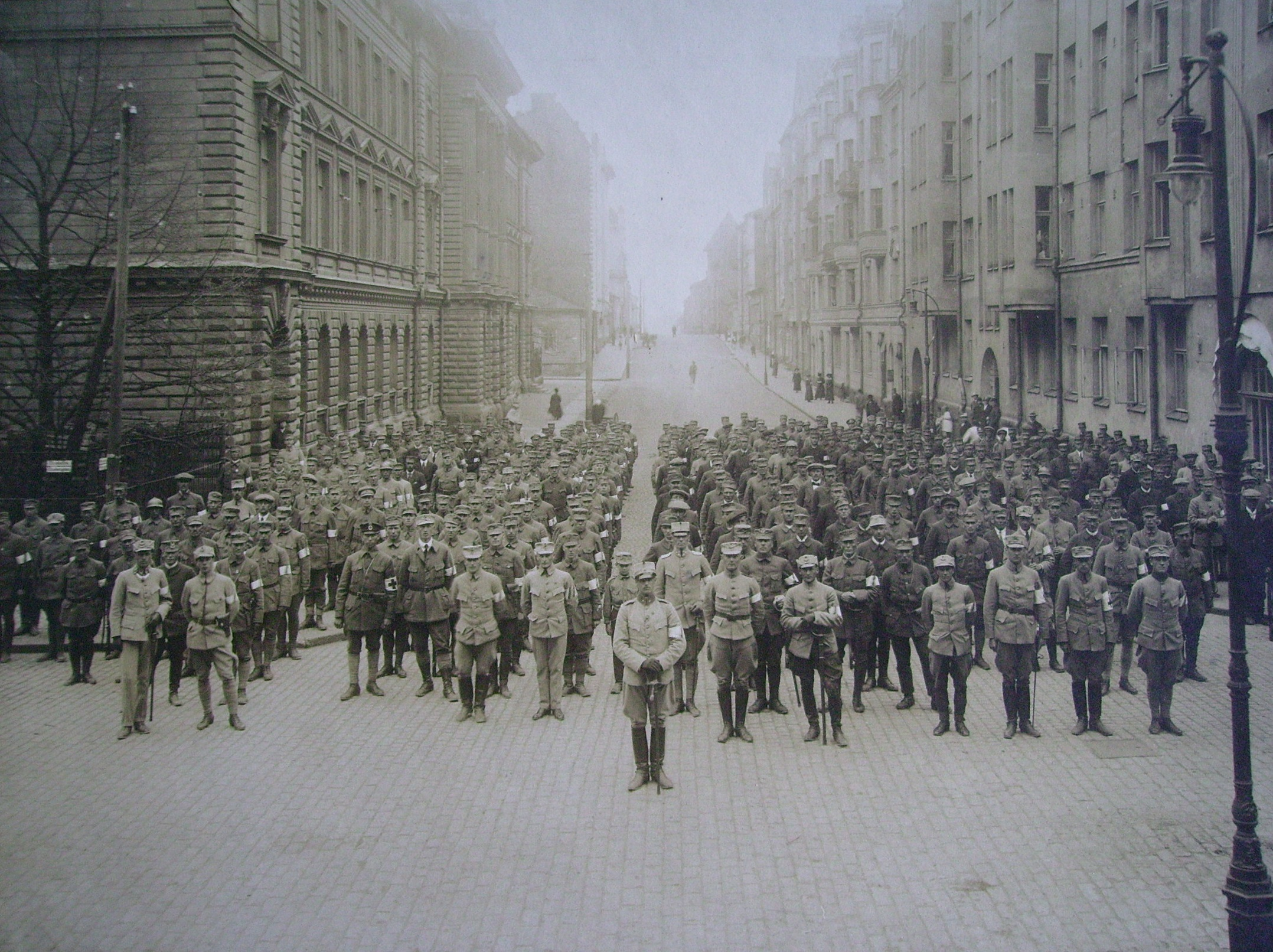
The Swedish Brigade at the Whites victory parade in Helsinki. The unit of Swedish volunteers assisted the White Guard during the Finnish Civil War.

Sweden was officially neutral during World War I, although, under German pressure, they did take steps which were detrimental to the Allied powers including mining the Öresund channel, thus closing it to Allied shipping. Sweden also provided volunteers fighting for the White Guards together with the Germans against the Reds and Russians in the Finnish Civil War.

== World War II ==
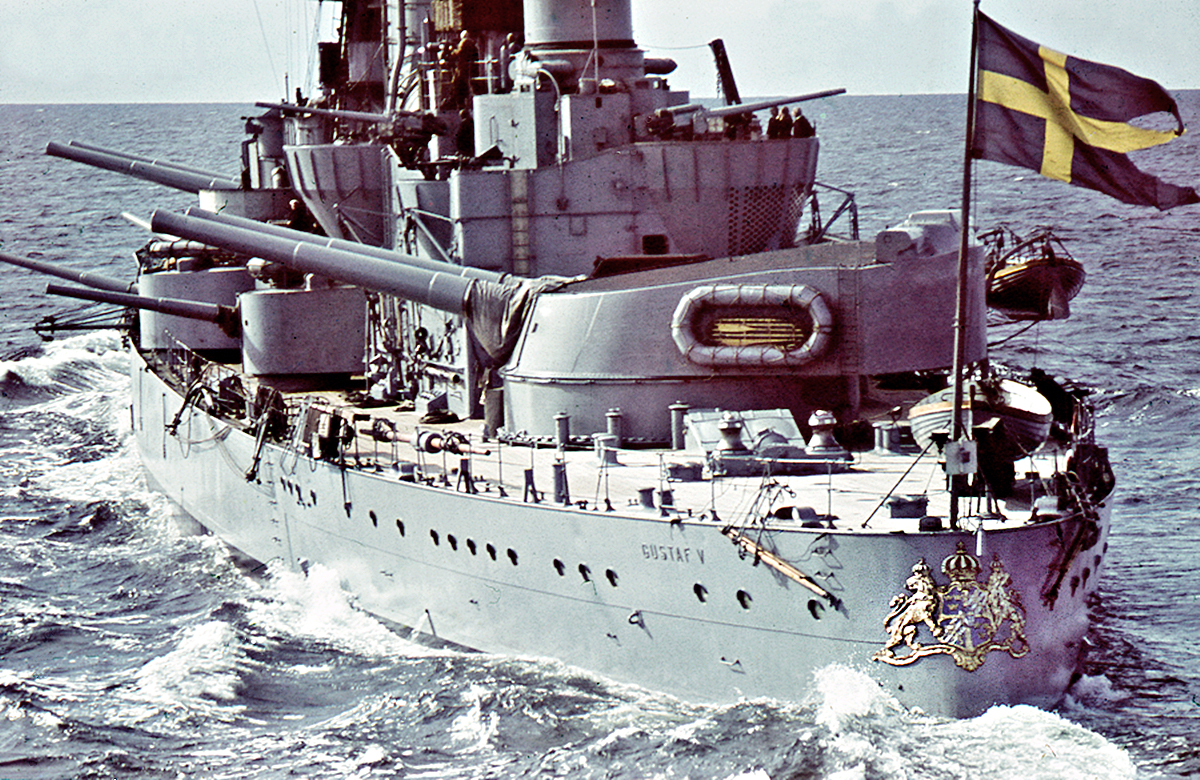
Swedish coastal defence ship HM Pansarskepp Gustaf V, with Bofors gun 283 mm (1922-1957).

Swedish neutrality – national policy since the end of the Napoleonic Wars – was maintained during World War II.

== Cold War ==
Sweden kept the non-alignment policy as well as the conscription-based army. The Swedish Air Force became one of the world's most prominent thanks to SAAB and other contractors. During this time a concept of "total defence" was developed to counter the feared full-scale invasion by the Soviet Union. This included, for example; bomb shelters in all new big buildings, bridges with prepared places for explosives and a pre-planned war-placement for almost every single citizen. During this time the "total defence system" could mobilize up to one million people to the military alone. This included around 100,000 Home Guard troops that could be mobilized within hours to protect the general mobilization, which could take up to two weeks to reach completion.

=== Congo Crisis ===
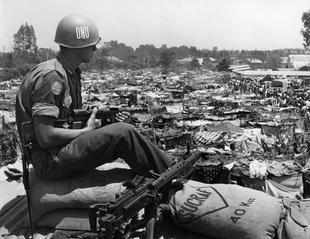
A Swedish soldier of the United Nations Operation in the Congo (UNOC). Carl von Horn of the Swedish Army was appointed UNOC's supreme commander.

During the Congo Crisis (1960–65) the U.N. Fighter Wing was formed and the Swedish F 22 Kongo was part of it. The Swedes flew Saab 29 Tunnan fighters against the rebel forces of Katanga.

== Post Cold War ==
During the 1990s, the armed forces budget was cut and several regiments were closed down. Several regiment towns have protested against downsizing, and the government has tried to prevent rising unemployment by relocating state agencies to these towns.

The number of enlisted recruits has decreased. The recruits are encouraged to sign up for additional service after their mandatory training is over. The units formed by those who chose to continue their service can be used as rapid response units in international missions, and are also targets of recruiting to the Nordic Battle Group.

Since the ending of the cold war, and despite a continuing position of neutrality, Sweden has been slowly playing an increased role in international operations, including NATO operations in Kosovo (KFOR) and Afghanistan (the International Security Assistance Force).

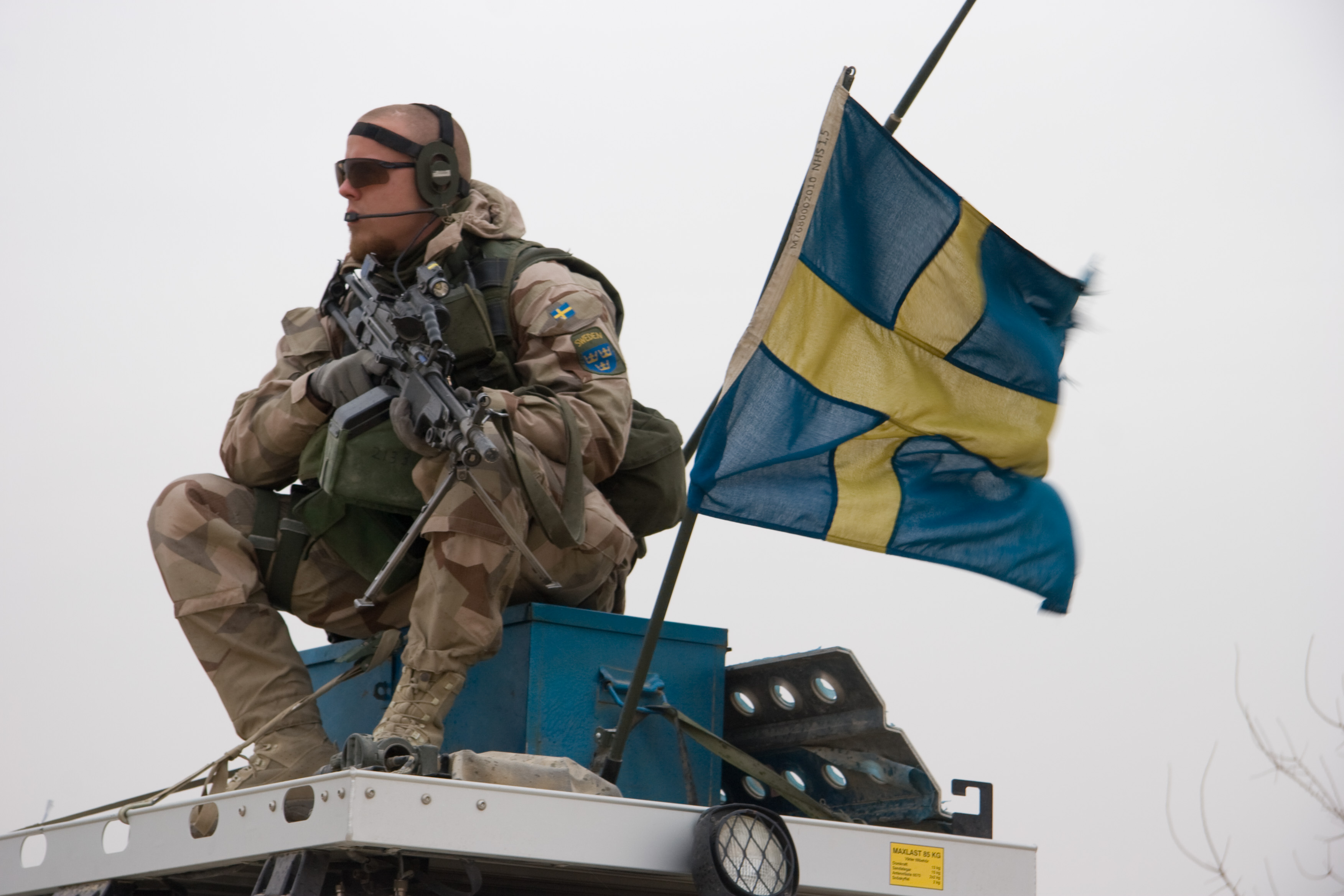
Swedish soldier in Afghanistan, 2008. The Swedish military contributed to International Security Assistance Force, a NATO-led mission security mission following the 2001 invasion of Afghanistan.

As of February 2020, Swedish soldiers are present in the following regions:

- Afghanistan
- Central African Republic
- Hungary
- Korea
- Kosovo
- Mali
- Middle East
- Pakistan
- Somalia
- Western Sahara
- Yemen

Sweden has registered about 15 units in the rapid response unit catalogs of the EU, UN, or NATO. Sweden takes an active part in international exercises such as the Multi National Experiment run by the USJFCOM.

Sweden is the framework nation for the Nordic Battlegroup, one of the EU Battlegroups that was active during the first half of 2008. This was also repeated during 2011. Sweden had command of the battlegroup for the third time in 2015, when it was placed in standby during the period of 1 January - 30 June.

In 2010 Sweden deactivated conscription, only to activate it again in 2017. During the same time, the conscription was made gender-neutral, meaning that both women and men are since called up for obligatory military service .

== Sweden and NATO ==
After Russias annexation of Crimea in 2014 Sweden made the national defence the priority of the military once again. The full Russian invasion of Ukraine in 2022 also made Sweden together with Finland apply for NATO membership. Several regements were re-open and the military defence budget will double from 2020 to 2024.

On March 7, 2024, Sweden became NATO's 32nd member soon after Hungary deposited its instrument of ratification.

== See also ==
- Rise of Sweden as a Great Power
- List of Swedish wars
- Category:Wars involving Sweden
- Swedish Armed Forces
