= Battle of Tsaryovo-Zaymishche =

1610 battle

Coordinates: 55°25′36″N 34°49′16″E

- Part of Polish–Muscovite War (1605–1618)
Date	23–24 June 1610
Location	Russia
Result	Polish–Lithuanian victory

Belligerents
Polish–Lithuanian Commonwealth	Tsardom of Russia

Commanders and leaders
Stanisław Żółkiewski	Grigory Valuyev

Strength
11,000	6,000–8,000

Casualties and losses
Light	Light

The Battle of Tsaryovo-Zaymishche took place on June 23–24, 1610, during the Polish–Muscovite War (1605–18). Forces of the Polish–Lithuanian Commonwealth were commanded by Hetman of Poland, Stanislaw Zolkiewski, while Russians were led by Grigory Valuyev. The battle ended in decisive Polish victory.

== Prelude ==
On September 29, 1609, the Commonwealth army under Chancellor Lew Sapieha reached the heavily fortified Russian city of Smolensk. The Siege of Smolensk began on October 4. Meanwhile, the Russian army of Tsar Vasili concentrated in the area of Moscow. In early May 1610, a Russian unit under Dmitry Shuisky was sent to aid the garrison of Smolensk. Near Mozhaysk, Szuisky concentrated some 15.000 soldiers, together with 25.000 poorly armed and untrained peasants. Furthermore, he was supported by 8.000 well-equipped Swedish soldiers of Jacob De la Gardie.

== Battle ==
On June 4, 1610, Hetman Zolkiewski ordered the army to march towards Tsaryovo-Zaymishche. Before the Poles and Lithuanians reached the town (June 23), the Russians burned it, preparing temporary strongpoints, protected by a forest and nearby swamps. A clash ensued, in which neither side managed to prevail. On the next day, more Commonwealth troops appeared and attacked, forcing the Russians to retreat. A temporary bridge was constructed, protected by Polish infantry and Zaporozhian Cossacks. In the afternoon of June 24, after a short fight, the Russians abandoned their positions, losing some 100 men.

== Aftermath ==
After the battle, rebel forces under Aleksander Zborowski appeared at Tsaryovo-Zaymishche. After Hetman Zolkiewski had personally guaranteed payment of their salaries, Zborowski’s soldiers joined his army. Meanwhile Russian survivors of the battle retreated to a fortified camp, which was surrounded by 700 Polish cavalry, 800 infantry, and 3.000 Cossacks. After a few days, the Russians surrendered, and Commonwealth forces immediately marched towards Klushino (see Battle of Klushino).
