= Grigory Valuyev =

17th-century Russian voivode

Voyevoda Grigory Valuyev
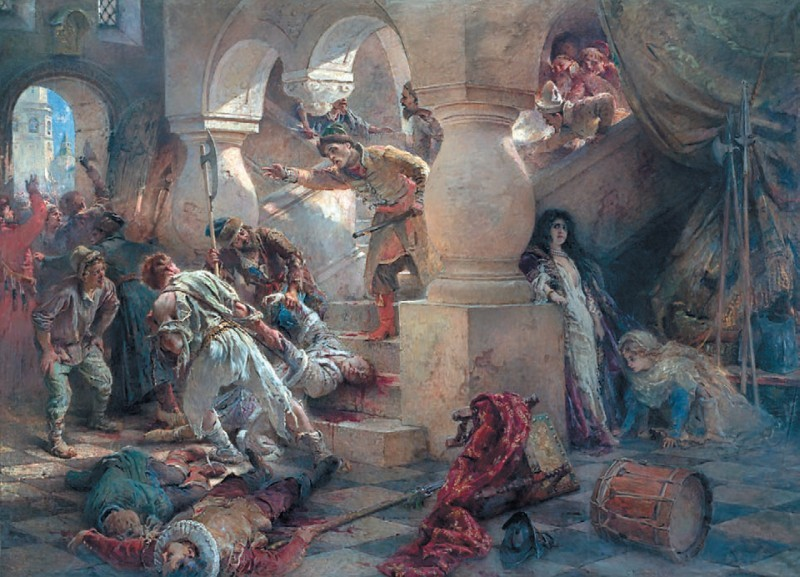
- Native name: Григорий Леонтьевич Валуев
- Died: after 1623
- Allegiance: Muscovite Tsardom
- Service years: 1606–1623
- Rank: Voivode
- Conflicts: Siege of Troitse-Sergiyeva Lavra, Battle of Tsaryovo-Zaymishche

Grigory Leontyevich Valuyev, also spelt as Voluyev (Russian: Григорий Леонтьевич Валуев) (? – after 1623), was a Russian voyevoda, the older of the two sons of Leontiy Valuyev.

== Life ==
Grigory Valuyev (together with Ivan Voyeykov) made himself a name in May 1606 by fatally shooting False Dmitry I (according to other accounts, it was a Muscovite merchant by the name of Mylnik or Mylnikov who had made the fatal shot). Thus, Voluyev’s participation in the impostor’s assassination brought him closer to the court of Vasili IV of Russia. Grigory Valuyev was often used as a voyevoda/messenger between the tsar and his cousin Mikhail Skopin-Shuisky during the latter’s trip to Novgorod in 1609. At the order of Mikhail Skopin-Shuisky, Grigory Valuyev (together with Semyon Golovin, Prince Yakov Baryatinsky, and David Zherebtsov) had to prevent the Lithuanian forces from crossing the Zhabyn River. On 1 September 1609, Valuyev, Golovin, and a Swedish commander marshal Kristiern Somme occupied Pereyaslavl-Zalessky and then forced the Polish army out of Alexandrovskaya Sloboda.

On 9 January 1610 Mikhail Skopin-Shuisky sent Grigory Valuyev with 500 soldiers to assist in relieving the Siege of Troitse-Sergiyeva Lavra, laid by Polish commanders Jan Piotr Sapieha and Aleksander Józef Lisowski. After Mikhail Skopin-Shuisky’s sudden death in April 1610, Valuyev was transferred under the command of Dmitry Shuisky and sent to defend the western borders from the army of Hetman Stanisław Żółkiewski. On 11 May 1610 Grigory Valuyev, together with Swedish commanders Jacob De la Gardie and Evert Horn, expelled the Polish army from Joseph-Volokolamsk Monastery and rescued Metropolitan Filaret of Rostov from Roman Ruzhinsky (commander of False Dmitry II’s army in Tushino). After that, Valuyev and Prince Fyodor Yeletsky were put in charge of a unit stationed in a village of Tsaryovo-Zaymishche and responsible for providing cover for the army of Dmitry Shuisky (located near Mozhaysk). Stanisław Żółkiewski besieged Tsaryovo-Zaymishche and then led the rest of his army towards Mozhaysk, defeating the Russians at the Battle of Klushino. The hetman then returned to Tsaryovo-Zaymishche and offered the besieged to surrender.

Grigory Valuyev and Fyodor Yeletsky decided to capitulate and swore allegiance to Władysław IV Vasa on the conditions specified earlier by a Russian voyevoda and statesman Mikhail Glebovich Saltykov during his negotiations with Sigismund III Vasa (those conditions were as follows: 1) release of all Russian prisoners, 2) in case Władysław takes control over Smolensk, Sigismund must abandon the city without causing any destruction or violence, 3) there will be no Catholicism in Russia). Valuyev, Yeletsky and their men joined the Polish army and headed towards Moscow, asking the Muscovites in a written message to swear allegiance to the new Russian tsar Władysław. As the ensuing developments illustrated, the Poles had no intention to fulfill these conditions.

After the enthronement of Mikhail Romanov in the summer of 1613, Grigory Valuyev showed himself as his zealous servant. In 1614, he was ordered to remain in Moscow to defend the city against a possible attack by the Nogai Horde. In 1615, Valuyev served as voyevoda in Vologda and was sent back to Moscow that same year. In 1617, he and a boyar named Boris Lykov-Obolensky were dispatched to Mozhaysk to defend the city against Władysław’s army. In 1618, Valuyev participated in the defense of Moscow against Władysław’s army. In 1619-1620, he was a voyevoda in Yelets. In 1621, Valuyev was sent as a second voyevoda to Vyazma to join Prince Alexei Sitsky. In 1623, he was dispatched to Astrakhan to serve together with Prince Ivan Fyodorovich Khovansky. Grigory Valuyev was married to a certain Ulyana Stepanovna, from whom he had the only son named Ivan.
