= Trinity Lavra of St. Sergius =

Russian monastery and the spiritual centre of the Russian Orthodox Church

- Троице-Сергиева лавра (Russian)
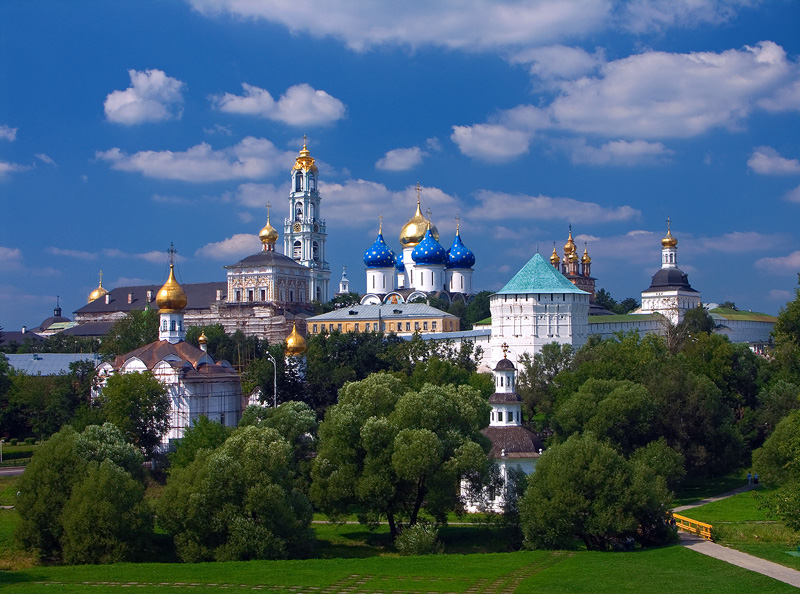
- General view
- Interactive map of Trinity Lavra of St. Sergius

Monastery information
- Established: 1345
- Diocese: Moscow (stauropegic)

People
- Founder: Sergius of Radonezh

Site
- Location: Sergiyev Posad, Russia
- Location within European Russia Location within Europe

UNESCO World Heritage Site
- Official name: Architectural Ensemble of the Trinity Sergius Lavra in Sergiev Posad
- Criteria: Cultural: (ii), (iv)
- Reference: 657
- Inscription: 1993 (17th Session)
- Area: 22.75 ha (0.0878 sq mi)
- Buffer zone: 15.57 ha (0.0601 sq mi)
- Website: www.stsl.ru/languages/en/
- Coordinates: 56°18′37.26″N 38°7′52.32″E

The Trinity Lavra of St. Sergius (Russian: Троице-Сергиева лавра) is a lavra and the most important Russian monastery, being the spiritual centre of the Russian Orthodox Church. The monastery is situated in the town of Sergiyev Posad, about 70 kilometres (43 mi) to the northeast from Moscow by the road leading to Yaroslavl, and currently is home to over 300 monks.

== History ==
=== 14th century ===
The monastery was founded in 1337 by one of the most venerated Russian saints, Sergius of Radonezh, who built a wooden church in honour of the Holy Trinity on Makovets Hill. Early development of the monastic community is well documented in contemporary lives of Sergius and his disciples.

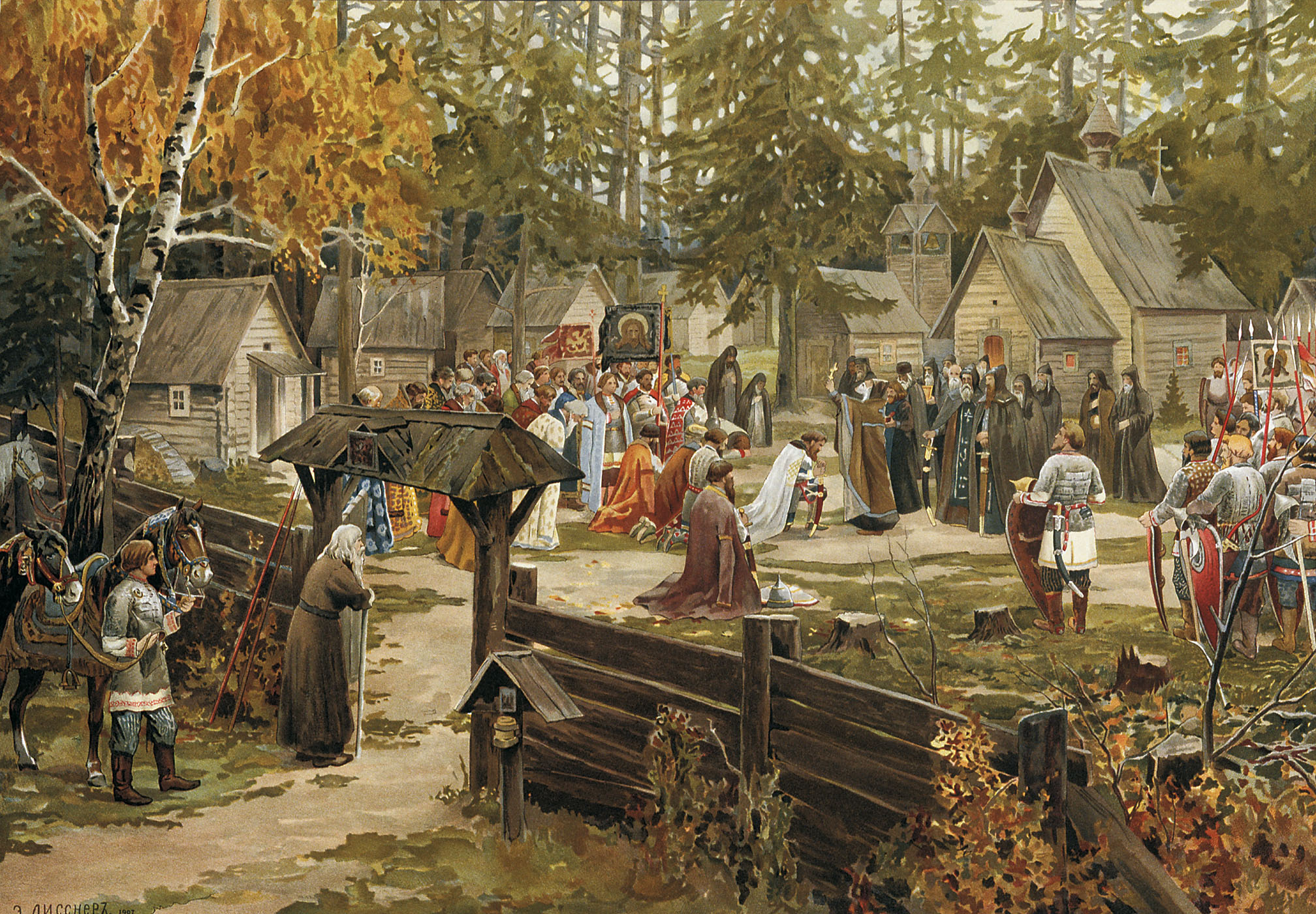
Sergius of Radonezh blessing Dmitri Donskoi before the Battle of Kulikovo depicted in a 1907 watercolor on paper by Ernst Lissner.

In 1355, Sergius introduced a charter which required the construction of auxiliary buildings, such as refectory, kitchen, and bakery. This charter was a model for Sergius' numerous followers who founded more than 400 monasteries all over Russia, including the celebrated Solovetsky, Kirillov, and Simonov monasteries.

St. Sergius supported Dmitri Donskoi in his struggle against the Tatars and sent two of his monks, Peresvet and Oslyabya, to participate in the Battle of Kulikovo (1380). At the outbreak of the battle, Peresvet died in a single combat against a Tatar bogatyr. The monastery was devastated by fire, when a Tatar unit raided the area in 1408.

=== 15th century ===
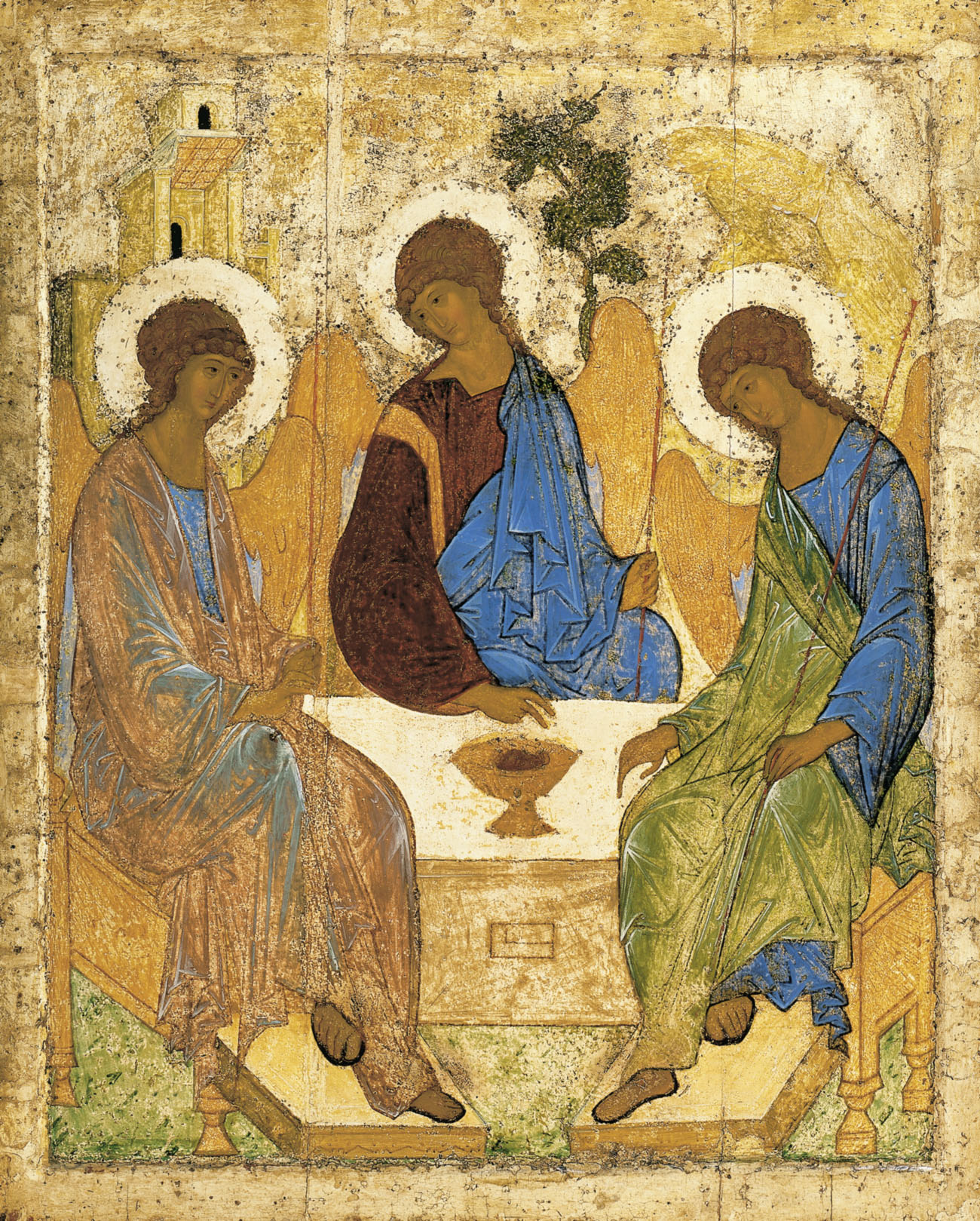
Rublev's icon The Trinity is the central piece of the Trinity Cathedral's iconostasis.

St. Sergius was declared patron saint of the Russian state in 1422. The same year the first stone cathedral was built by a team of Serbian monks who had found refuge in the monastery after the Battle of Kosovo. The relics of St. Sergius still may be seen in this cathedral, dedicated to the Holy Trinity. The greatest icon painters of medieval Russia, Andrei Rublev and Daniil Chyorny, were summoned to decorate the cathedral with frescoes. Traditionally, Muscovite royals were baptized in this cathedral and held thanksgiving services here.

In 1476, Ivan III invited several Pskovian masters to build the church of the Holy Spirit. This structure is one of the few remaining examples of a Russian church topped with a belltower. The interior contains the earliest specimens of the use of glazed tiles for decoration. In the early 16th century, Vasily III added the Nikon annex and the Serapion tent, where several of Sergius' disciples were interred.

=== 16th century ===
It took 26 years to construct the six-pillared Assumption Cathedral, which was commissioned by Ivan the Terrible in 1559. The cathedral is much larger than its model and namesake in the Moscow Kremlin. The magnificent iconostasis of the 16th–18th centuries features Simon Ushakov's masterpiece, the icon of Last Supper. The interior walls were painted with violet and blue frescoes by a team of Yaroslavl masters in 1684. The vault contains burials of Boris Godunov, his family and several 20th-century patriarchs.

As the monastery grew into one of the wealthiest landowners in Russia, the woods where it had stood were cleared and a village (or posad) sprang up near the monastery walls. It gradually developed into the modern town of Sergiyev Posad. The cloister itself was a notable centre of chronicle-writing and icon painting. Just opposite the monastery walls St. Paraskeva's Convent was established, among whose buildings St. Paraskeva's Church (1547), Introduction Church (1547), and a 17th-century chapel over St. Paraskeva's well are still visible.

=== 17th century ===
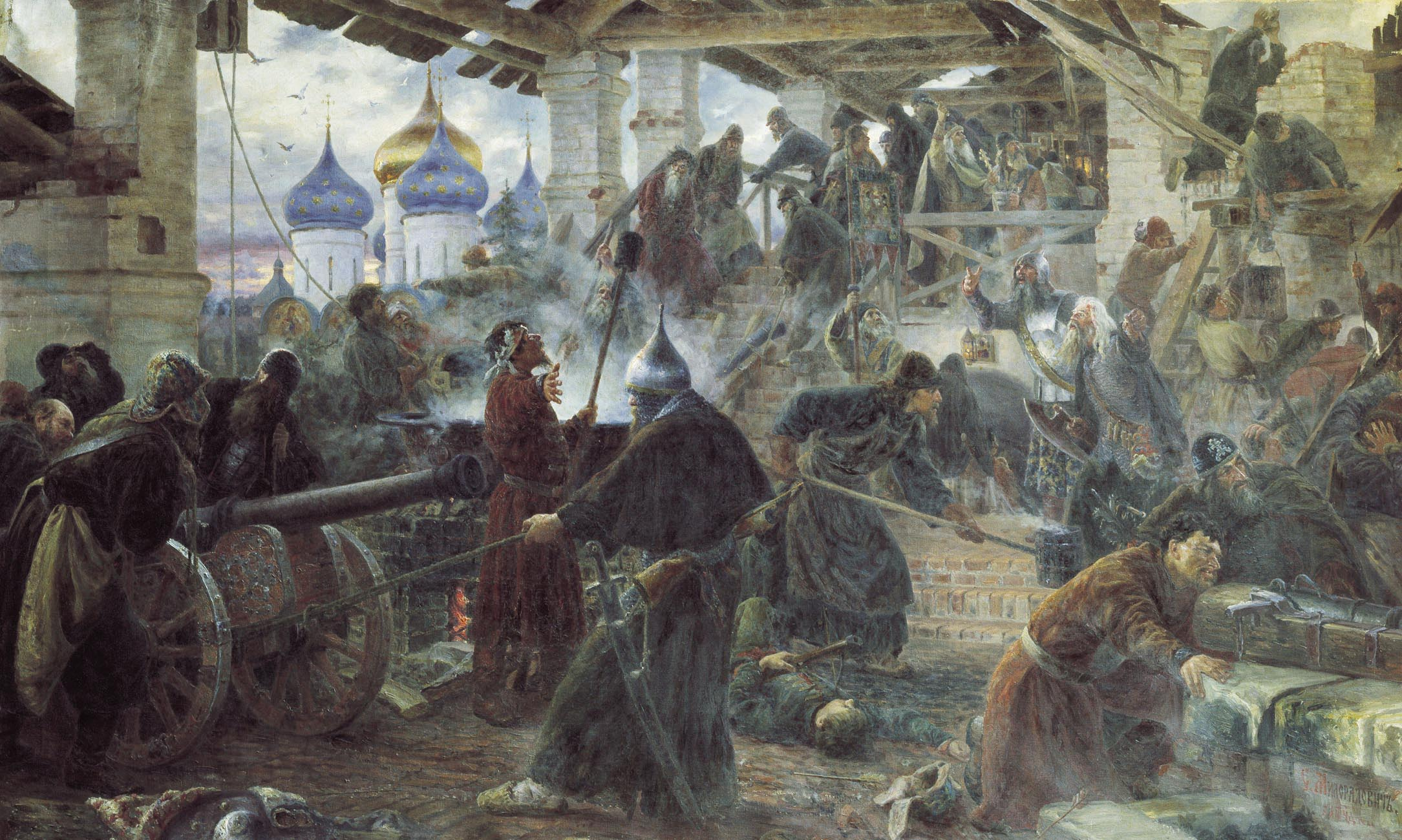
Siege of 1608–1610: Orthodox monks led by the chronicler Avraamy Palitsyn defended the monastery against Polish troops from September 1609 to January 1611.

In 1550s, a wooden palisade surrounding the cloister was replaced with 1.5 km (0.93 mi) long stone walls, featuring twelve towers, which helped the monastery to withstand a celebrated 16-month Polish-Lithuanian siege in 1608–1610. A shell-hole in the cathedral gates is preserved as a reminder of Wladyslaw IV's abortive siege in 1618.

By the end of the 17th century, when young Peter I twice found refuge within the monastery from his enemies, numerous buildings had been added. These include a small baroque palace of the patriarchs, noted for its luxurious interiors, and a royal palace, with its facades painted in checkerboard design. The refectory of St. Sergius, covering 510 square metres (5,500 sq ft) and also painted in dazzling checkerboard design, used to be the largest hall in Russia. The five-domed Church of John the Baptist's Nativity (1693–1699) was commissioned by the Stroganovs and built over one of the gates. Other 17th-century structures include the monks' cells, a hospital topped with a tented church, and a chapel built over a holy well discovered in 1644.

=== 18th and 19th centuries ===
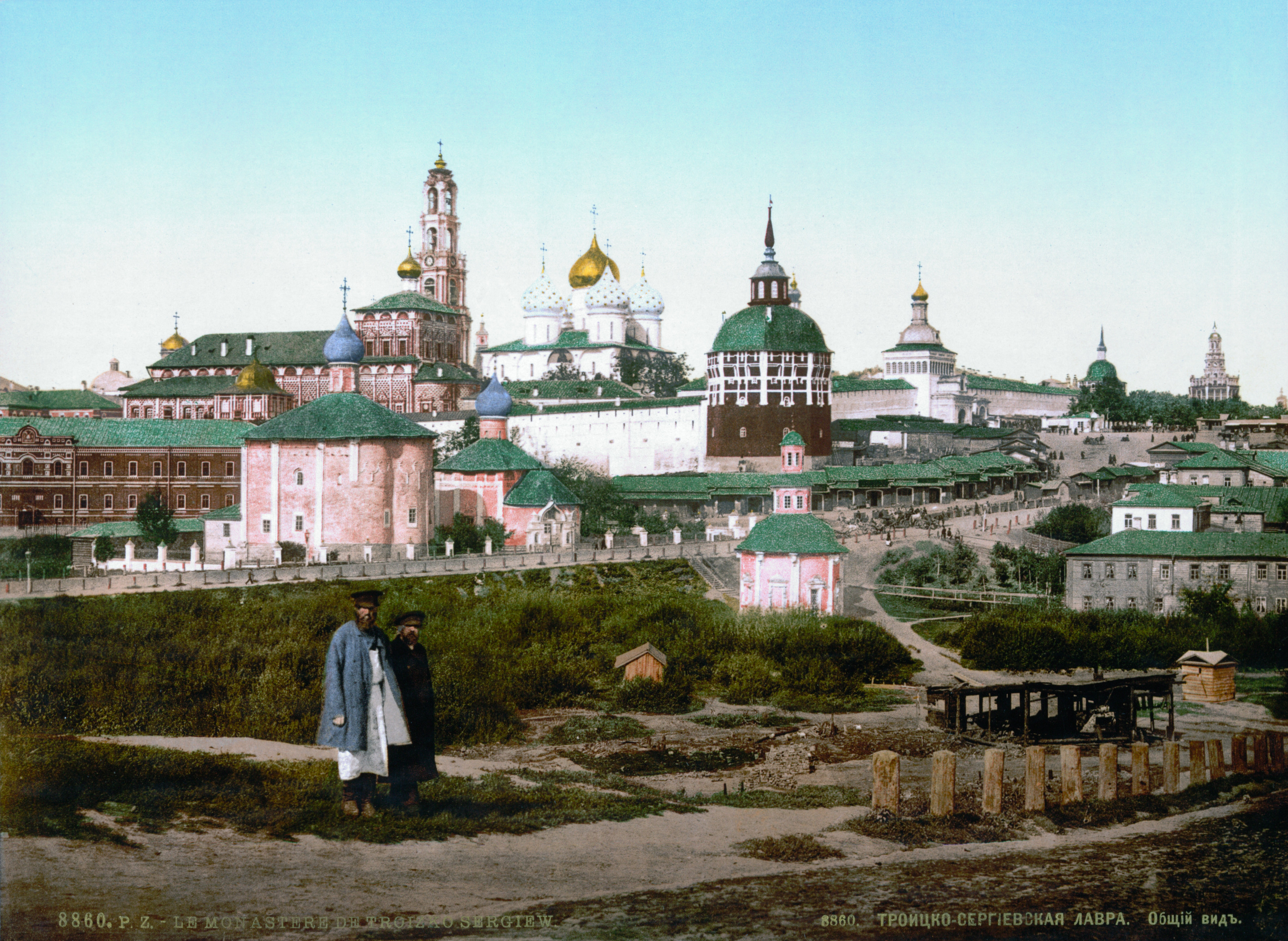
View of the lavra in the 1890s.

In 1744, Empress Elizabeth conferred on the cloister the dignity of a Lavra. The metropolitan of Moscow was henceforth also the Archimandrite of the Lavra. Elizabeth particularly favoured the Trinity and annually proceeded afoot from Moscow to the cloister. Her secret spouse Alexey Razumovsky accompanied her on such journeys and commissioned a baroque church to the Virgin of Smolensk, the last major shrine to be erected in the Lavra. Another pledge of Elizabeth's affection for the monastery is a white-and-blue baroque belltower, which, at 88 meters, was one of the tallest structures built in Russia up to that date. Its architects were Ivan Michurin and Dmitry Ukhtomsky.

Throughout the 19th century, the Lavra maintained its status as the richest Russian monastery. A seminary founded in 1742 was replaced by an ecclesiastical academy in 1814. The monastery boasted a supreme collection of manuscripts and books. Medieval collections of the Lavra sacristy attracted thousands of visitors. In Sergiyev Posad, the monastery maintained several sketes, one of which is a place of burial for the conservative philosophers Konstantin Leontiev and Vasily Rozanov.

=== 20th century ===
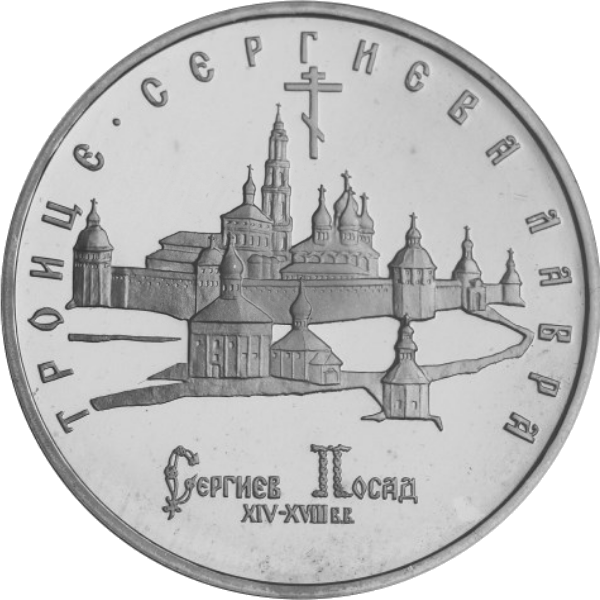
1993 5 ruble coin depicting Trinity Lavra

Consequent to the Russian Revolution of 1917, the Soviet government closed the lavra in 1920. Its buildings were assigned to different civic institutions or declared museums. Part was used for training electrical engineers specialising in radio. In May 1923 Charles Ashleigh reported how the hall was used to demonstrate the new radio technology before a mixed audience primarily composed of peasants and soldiers, but with some townspeople. The broadcast started with an announcement followed by music with a band from the Moscow cavalry playing Stenka Razin. Then the audience were treated to a short lecture on the benefits of chemical manure and machine ploughs. After a gypsy song the performance was brought to a conclusion with a talk about the wonders of radio. In 1930, monastery bells, including the Tsar-Bell of 65 tons, were destroyed. Pavel Florensky and his followers prevented the authorities from stealing and selling the sacristy collection but overall many valuables were lost or transferred to other collections.

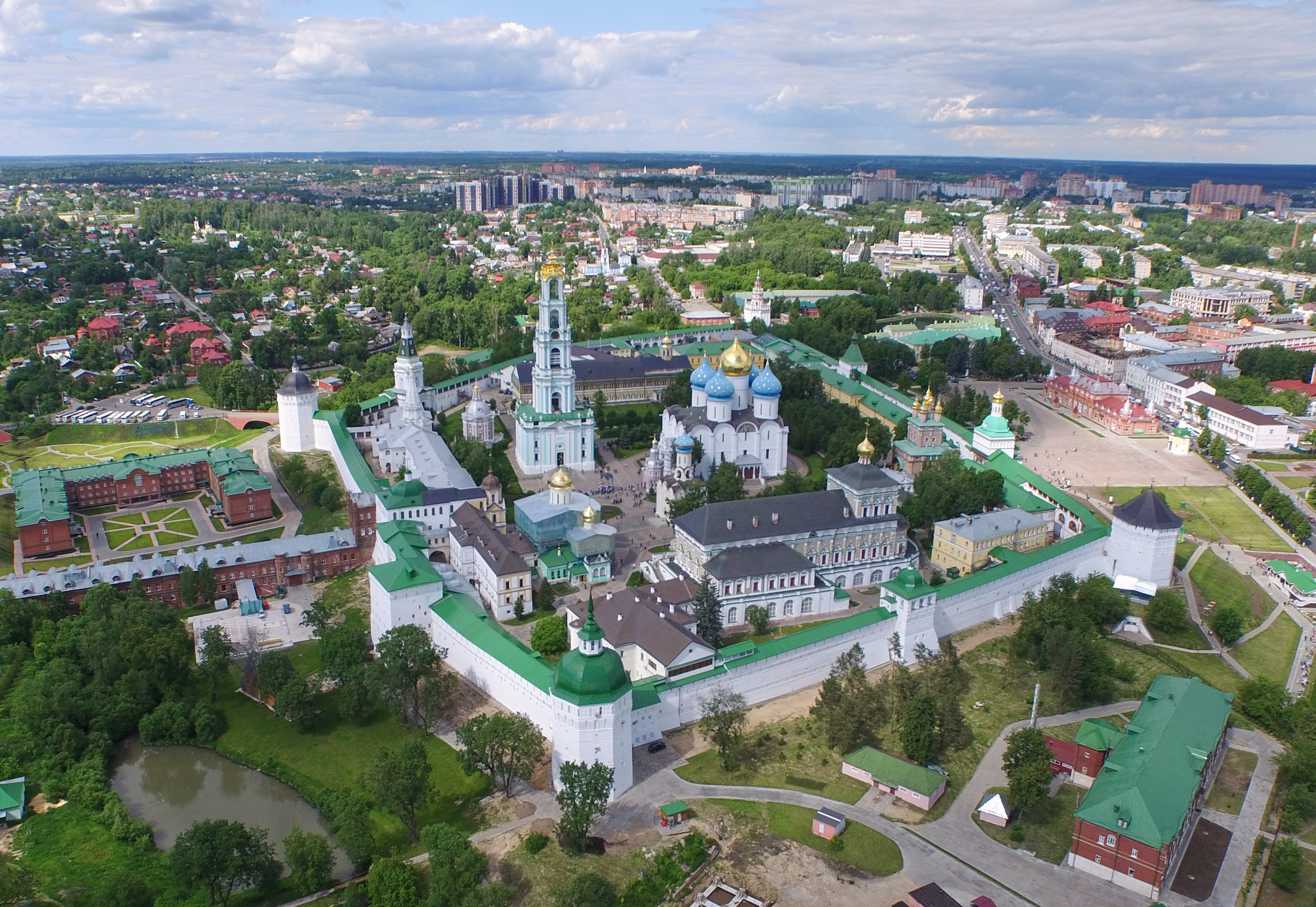
Aerial view

In 1945, following Joseph Stalin's temporary tolerance of the church during World War II, the Lavra was returned to the Russian Orthodox Church. On April 16, 1946 divine service was renewed at the Assumption Cathedral. The lavra continued as the seat of the Moscow Patriarchate until 1983, when the patriarch was allowed to settle at the Danilov Monastery in Moscow.

After that, the monastery continued as a prime centre of religious education. Important restoration works were conducted in the 1960s and 1970s. In 1993, the Trinity Lavra was inscribed on the UN World Heritage List.

The Lavra has a number of representative churches (podvorie or metochia) in its vicinity and throughout Russia. The Lavra's hieromonks have manned a number of sketes at remote locations (such as the Anzer Island in the Solovki Archipelago in the White Sea), as well as Trinity Church on King George Island in the Antarctic.

== Notable burials ==
- Innocent of Alaska
- Patriarch Alexy I of Russia
- Tsar Boris Godunov and family
- Yuriy Trubetskoy
- Dmitry Troubetskoy
- Sergius of Radonezh
- Feodor II of Russia
