= Avraamy Palitsyn =

Russian historian

- Авраамий Палицын
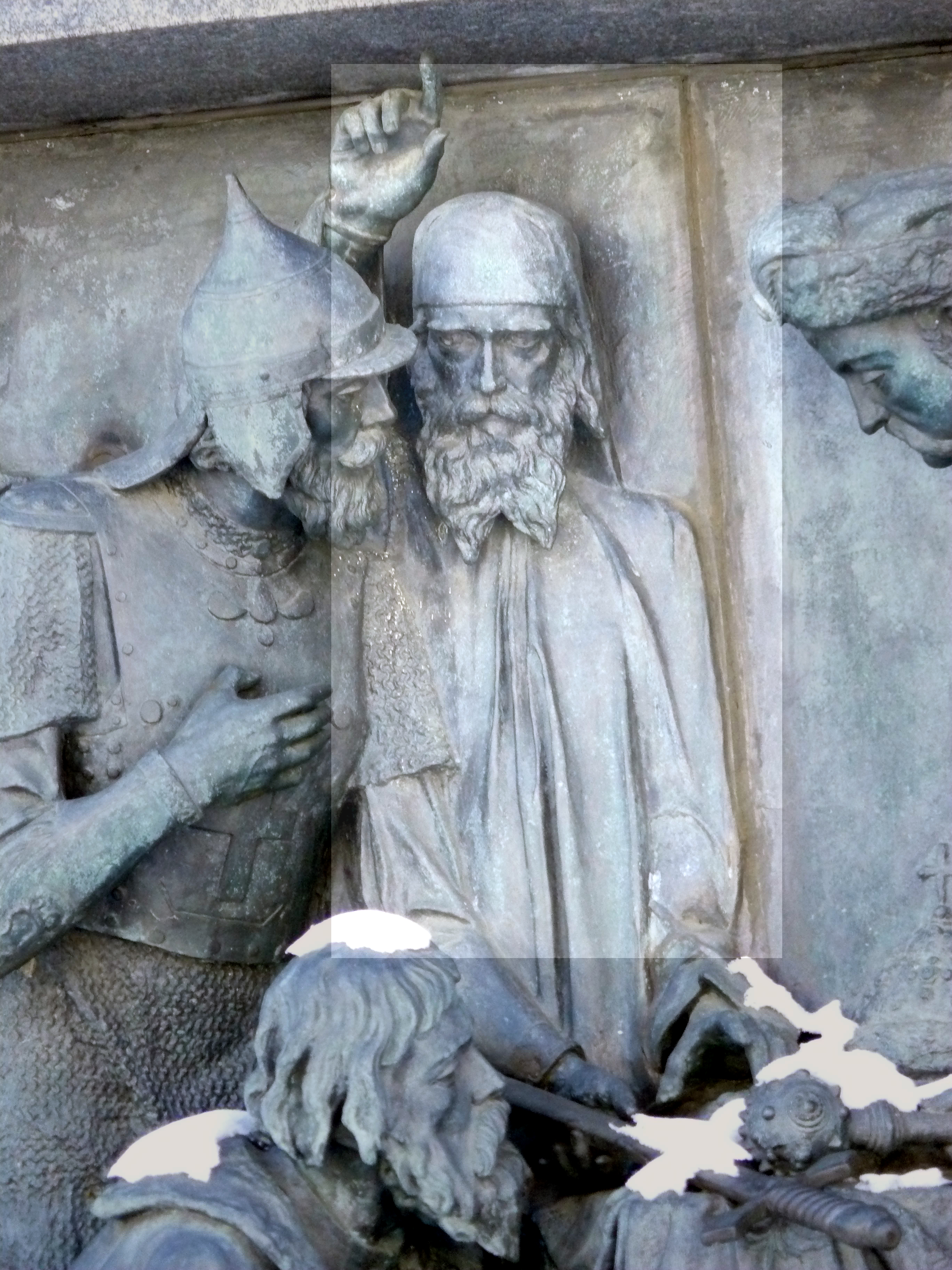
- Avraamy Palitsyn on the Millennium of Russia's Monument. Veliky Novgorod, Russia
- Born: 1550; Rostov, Tsardom of Russia
- Died: 13 September 1626 (aged 75–76); Solovetsky Monastery, Tsardom of Russia
- Scientific career
- Fields: History
- Institutions: Troitse-Sergiyeva Lavra

Avraamy Palitsyn (Russian: Авраамий Палицын; 1550 – 13 September 1626 or 1627) was a 17th-century Russian historian. Born near Rostov, he was the cellarer at the Troitse-Sergiyeva Lavra from 1606 to 1613. Palitsyn died in the Solovetsky Monastery on 13 September 1626.

From 1611 to 1612, he made numerous written appeals for the liberation of Moscow from the Polish forces that had conquered it during the Time of Troubles. He took part in the Russian deputation that signed the Treaty of Deulino in 1618.

Palitsyn wrote Istoriya v pamyat sushchim predydushchim godom (History to Be Remembered by Future Generations), a history of Russia's Time of Troubles, in 1620, as well as a description of the siege of his monastery that lasted from 1608 to 1610. His magnum opus was first printed by Nikolai Novikov in 1784.
