= Siege of Troitsky monastery =

1608–1610 siege during the Time of Troubles

Siege of the Trinity monastery
- Part of the Time of Troubles and the Polish–Russian War (1609–1618)
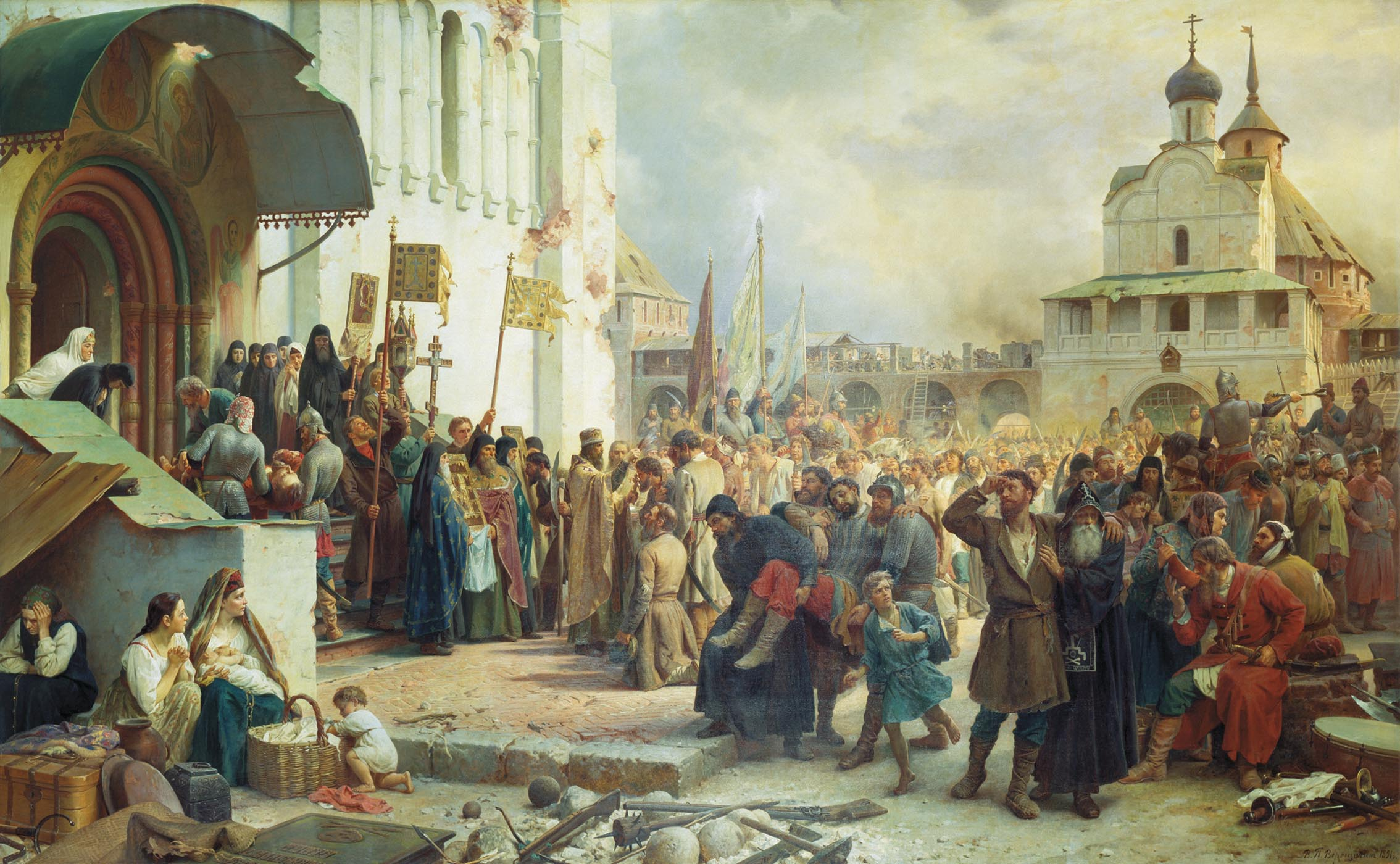
- Orthodox monks led by the chronicler Avraamy Palitsyn defended the Troitse-Sergiyeva Lavra against Polish troops from September 1609 to January 1611.
Date	23 September 1608 – 12 January 1610
Location	Sergiyev Posad, Russia 56°18′36″N 38°07′47″E
Result	Russian victory

Belligerents
Poland–Lithuania	Russia

Commanders and leaders
Jan Piotr Sapieha; Aleksander Lisowski	Grigory Dolgorukov; Aleksey Golokhvastov; Archimandrite Joasaph; Since October 1609: Grigory Valuyev; Davyd Zherebtsov

Strength
30,000 Polish interventionists and Cossacks; • Perhaps as few as 10,000 mercenaries took part (3,350 infantry-, 6,770 cavalrymen), with up to 17 field guns	2,400 warriors (Note: 2–2,500); 1,000 citizenry, specifically the elderly, women and children

Casualties and losses
Unknown	Heavy, around 2,000

The siege of Troitsky monastery (Russian: Троицкая осада) was an abortive attempt of the Polish–Lithuanian irregular army (mercenaries) that acted in support of False Dmitry II to capture the Trinity Lavra of St. Sergius, north-east of Moscow. The siege lasted for 16 months, from 23 September 1608 until 12 January 1610.

== Siege ==
In December 1608, the Polish army of some 15,000 men, led by Jan Piotr Sapieha and Aleksander Lisowski, laid siege to the fortress of the Trinity Monastery (Russian: Троицкий монастырь, romanized: Troitskiy monastyr'), which had been protecting the northern approaches to Moscow. The Russian garrison (estimated at between 2,200 and 2,400 men) consisted of dvoryane, streltsy, monastic servants, monks, and peasants, led by the voyevodas Prince Grigory Dolgorukov and Aleksey Golokhvastov.

In early October 1608, the attackers began shelling and mining the monastery. Numerous assaults in October and November were repelled by the Russians and resulted in heavy losses for the Polish army. The besieged undertook frequent sallies, one of which (9 November) ended with the explosion of a mine under a monastery tower and the destruction of an enemy battery on the Red Mountain, with two peasants, Shipov and Sloba, losing their lives during this sally.

There had been no significant military activity from late November 1608 until May 1609, but the besieged garrison suffered many casualties due to an outbreak of scurvy. In May through July 1609, the Russians repelled a number of enemy attacks. On 19 October 1609, and 4 January 1610, auxiliary detachments under the command of David Zherebtsov (900 men) and Grigory Valuyev (500 men) managed to make their way into the fortress. Under the threat of the approaching army of Mikhail Skopin-Shuisky, the Polish forces raised the siege on 12 January 1610 and retreated to Dmitrov.

== Aftermath ==
This defeat was a major blow for False Dmitry II. After King Sigismund III Vasa arrived at Smolensk in September 1609, the majority of his Polish supporters left him and joined with the armies of the Polish king. At the same time, a strong Russo-Swedish army under Mikhail Skopin-Shuisky and Jacob De la Gardie approached Tushino, forcing him to flee his camp disguised as a peasant and go to Kostroma. He was killed by his own men on 11 December 1610.

== See also ==
- Time of Troubles
- Sigismund III of Poland

== Sources ==
- Егоршина, Петрова (2023). История русской армии [The history of the Russian Army] (in Russian). Moscow: Edition of the Russian Imperial Library. ISBN 978-5-699-42397-2.
- Гумилев, Лев (2023). От Руси к России. Moscow: Москва. ISBN 978-5-17-153845-3.
