= Battle of Klushino =

1610 battle of the Polish-Muscovite War

- Part of the Polish–Russian War (1609–1618)
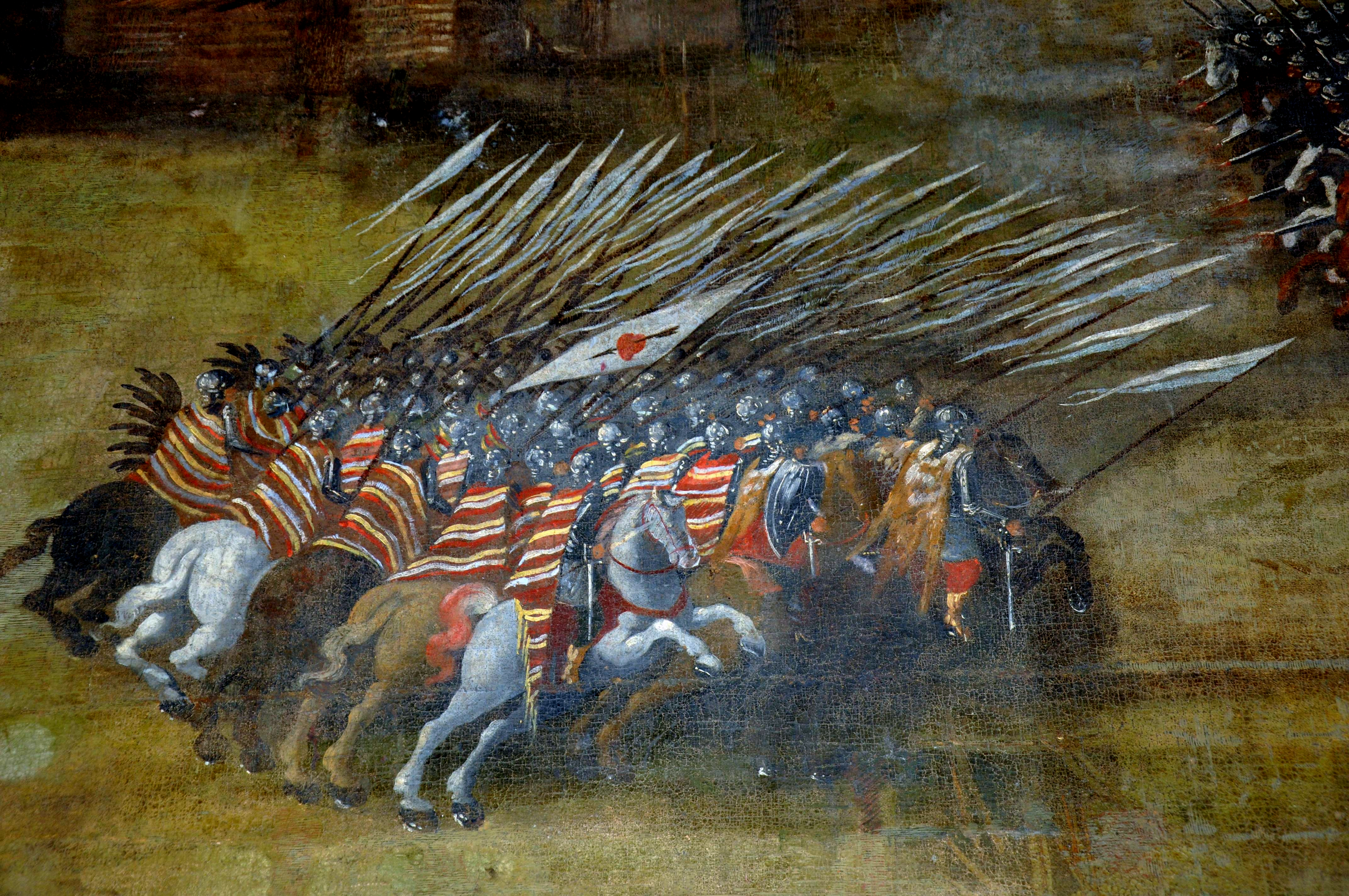
- Polish hussar line at the Battle of Kłuszyn
Date	4 July 1610
Location	Klushino, Russia 55°39′27″N 34°55′48″E
Result	Polish–Lithuanian victory

Belligerents
Poland–Lithuania	Russia (yes) Sweden

Commanders and leaders
Stanisław Żółkiewski	Dmitry Shuisky; Jacob De la Gardie

Strength
6,500–6,800 Poles; 2 guns	10,000 to 30,000 Russians; 5,000 mercenaries 11 guns

Casualties and losses
200–500 killed	5,000–15,000 dead and wounded
- Location within European Russia

The Battle of Klushino, or the Battle of Kłuszyn, was fought on 4 July 1610, between forces of the Polish–Lithuanian Commonwealth and the Tsardom of Russia during the Polish–Russian War, part of Russia's Time of Troubles. The battle occurred near the village of Klushino (Polish: Kłuszyn) near Smolensk (Polish: Smoleńsk). In the battle the outnumbered Polish-Lithuanian force secured a decisive victory over Russia, due to the tactical competence of hetman Stanisław Żółkiewski and the military prowess of Polish hussars, the elite of the army of the Crown of the Kingdom of Poland. The battle is remembered as one of the greatest triumphs of the Polish cavalry and an example of excellence and supremacy of the Polish military at the time.

== Background ==
In 1610, in response to the Polish-Lithuanian advance on Russia, Russia and Sweden formed an alliance, and launched an operation known as the De la Gardie Campaign. A Russian army under Prince Dmitry Shuisky was heading towards the besieged fortress of Smolensk, but was intercepted by Polish-Lithuanian forces. In the meantime, Shuisky divided his forces into several smaller units.

The Polish-Lithuanian forces of about 12,000 under hetman Stanisław Żółkiewski encountered the advance Russian force of 8,000 under Grigory Valuyev and attempted to attack it soon after dawn on 24 June, but the Russians were able to fortify their positions at Tsaryovo-Zaymishche camp. The Russian troops found themselves encircled and trapped in their camp, but the main force under Shuisky, of about 35,000, was only days away. Russia, however, did not know the real strength of the Polish-Lithuanian forces, and how greatly they outnumbered them. Further, the besieged advance unit failed to notify Shuisky that it had encountered the Polish-Lithuanian army. On the other hand, Żółkiewski was confident in his powerful hussars, and decided to press with the attack. On 3 July he decided to leave part of his forces besieging the camp, and take the most mobile units against Shuisky's troops. The ruse was successful, as the besieged troops never realized that the bulk of the Polish-Lithuanian army was temporarily engaged elsewhere, and neither was Shuisky aware of the Polish-Lithuanian movements nor expecting a major engagement.

== Opposing forces ==
The Polish-Lithuanian forces numbering about 6,500–6,800 men (of which about 5,500, or about 80 percent, were the famous "winged" hussars) under Hetman Stanisław Żółkiewski faced a numerically superior force of about 30,000 Russians under Princes Dmitry Shuisky, Andrey Galitzine, and Danilo Mezetsky, as well as about 5,000 mercenary units temporarily allied to Russia, under the command of Jacob De la Gardie, composed of Flemish, French, Irish, German, Spanish, English, and Scottish soldiers. Including the forces that did not take part in combat (remained in camp, reserve, or were delayed), the numbers were 12,300 Polish-Lithuanian soldiers against 48,000 soldiers under Russian command. The Polish-Lithuanian army was supported by two cannons (some sources say four), and the Tsardom of Russia by 11.

== Battle ==
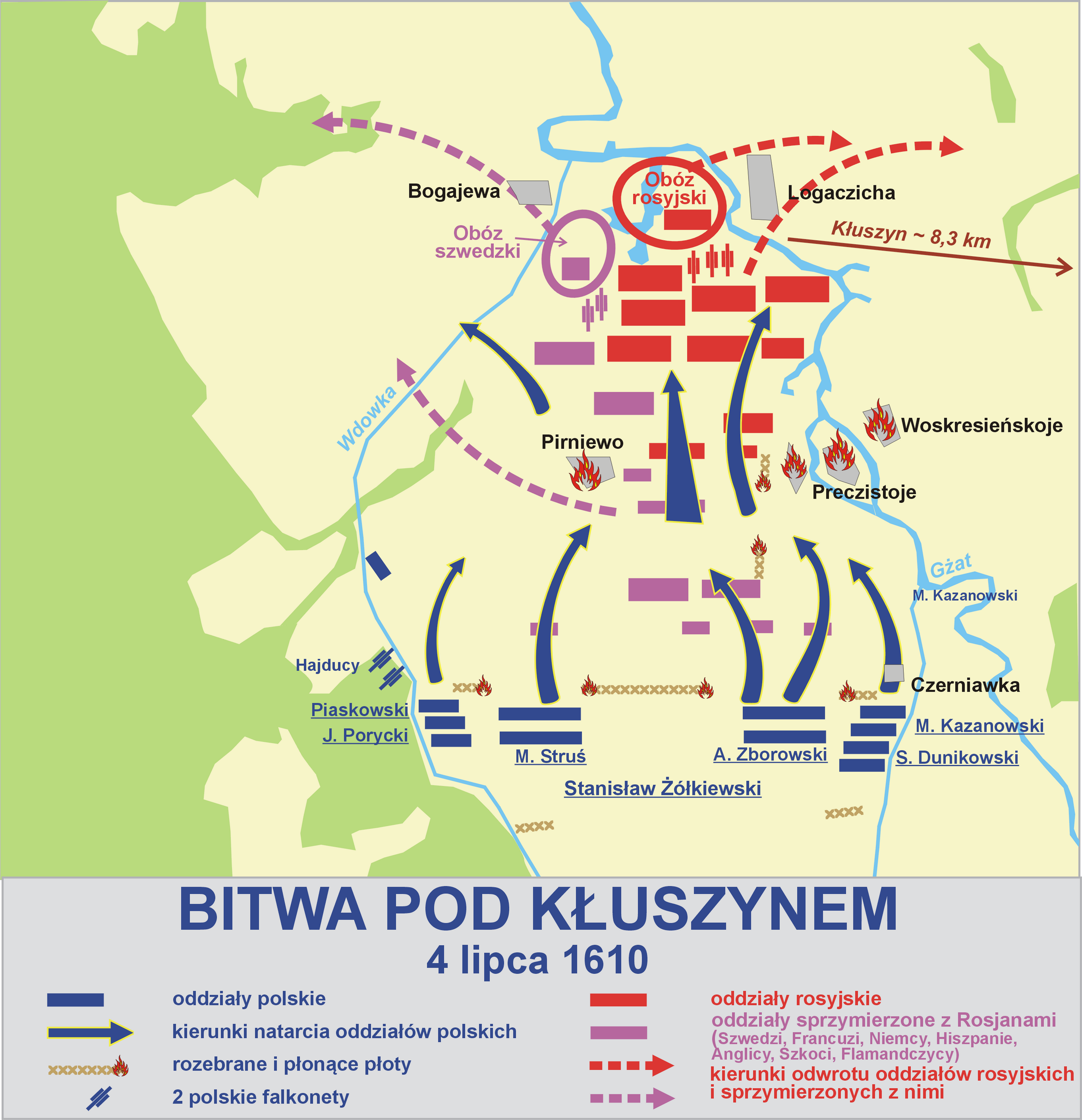
Map of the battle

According to a description based on the work of Leszek Podhorecki, although the Poles were more aware that the battle was about to take place, the forces encountered one another in the darkness of the night, and Żółkiewski decided to organize his army rather than engaging immediately, which also gave the Tsardom of Russia time to prepare. According to Mirosław Nagielski, however, the Poles under Żółkiewski purposefully chose to engage the opponent at that time, hoping to catch them asleep.

The Russian army was divided into foreign mercenary regiments on the right (north-west) flank, and the main Russian army on the center and left (south-east) flank. The Russian battle line consisted of infantry (pikemen, musketeers, arquebusiers), mostly behind the village fences, with a second line of cavalry to the rear and on the left wing (where there were fewer fences). The Russian artillery, left in the camp, played no role in the battle. Polish units consisted primarily of cavalry, namely the Polish hussars, with about 400 Cossack infantry on the left wing. Another 200 infantry and two cannons would arrive later, and did not participate in the first part of the battle.

The battlefield, a flat agricultural field, was crossed by a high village picket fence, reinforced by improvised fieldworks, which allowed the Polish hussars to charge only through a narrow gap.

The battle began before dawn. The first part of the battle consisted of Polish hussars repeatedly charging the fortified Russian positions, attempting to break them. The Polish forces continued to make ferocious attacks, and Samuel Maskiewicz, a witness from one hussar company, claimed that his unit charged eight or ten times. The Polish hussars' attacks on the infantry, hidden behind the fences, and using firearms, were not successful.

Hoping to take advantage of Polish exhaustion, Shuiski ordered a reiter unit to counterattack the hussars. However, their attempt to employ caracole tactics ended disastrously when the Polish cavalry instead closed into melee after discharging their firearms. As this Russian cavalry counterattack was mauled by the Poles, the left flank of the Russian army was broken and, in the ensuing confusion, Russian ranks broke and they were pushed back towards their camp gates.

While the center of the Russian army disintegrated, Russian regiments continued to hold on the right wing until they were overpowered, and the mercenary troops continued to put up strong resistance for several hours on the left wing. Eventually when the Polish infantry and cannons arrived, the mercenaries were forced to abandon their positions. A large portion of the foreign troops managed to retreat under the protection of their long infantry pikes in good order to the safety of their fortified camp (which was separate from the Russian camp).

The Polish forces now surrounded the two enemy camps. Further, the mercenaries who took positions in the forest were surrounded as well. However, the Russian fortified camp, filled with some still unbloodied troops (outnumbering the exhausted Polish force) was a serious obstacle.

Żółkiewski decided to attempt negotiations with the enemy, with significant success. Abandoned by the Russians, the foreign mercenaries entered negotiations with the Polish troops and eventually surrendered, having reached satisfactory conditions. The mercenaries were allowed to withdraw under the condition that they would not enlist with the Tsardom of Russia against the Polish–Lithuanian Commonwealth again. Additionally, several hundred mercenaries chose to switch sides, enlisting with the Polish-Lithuanian army.

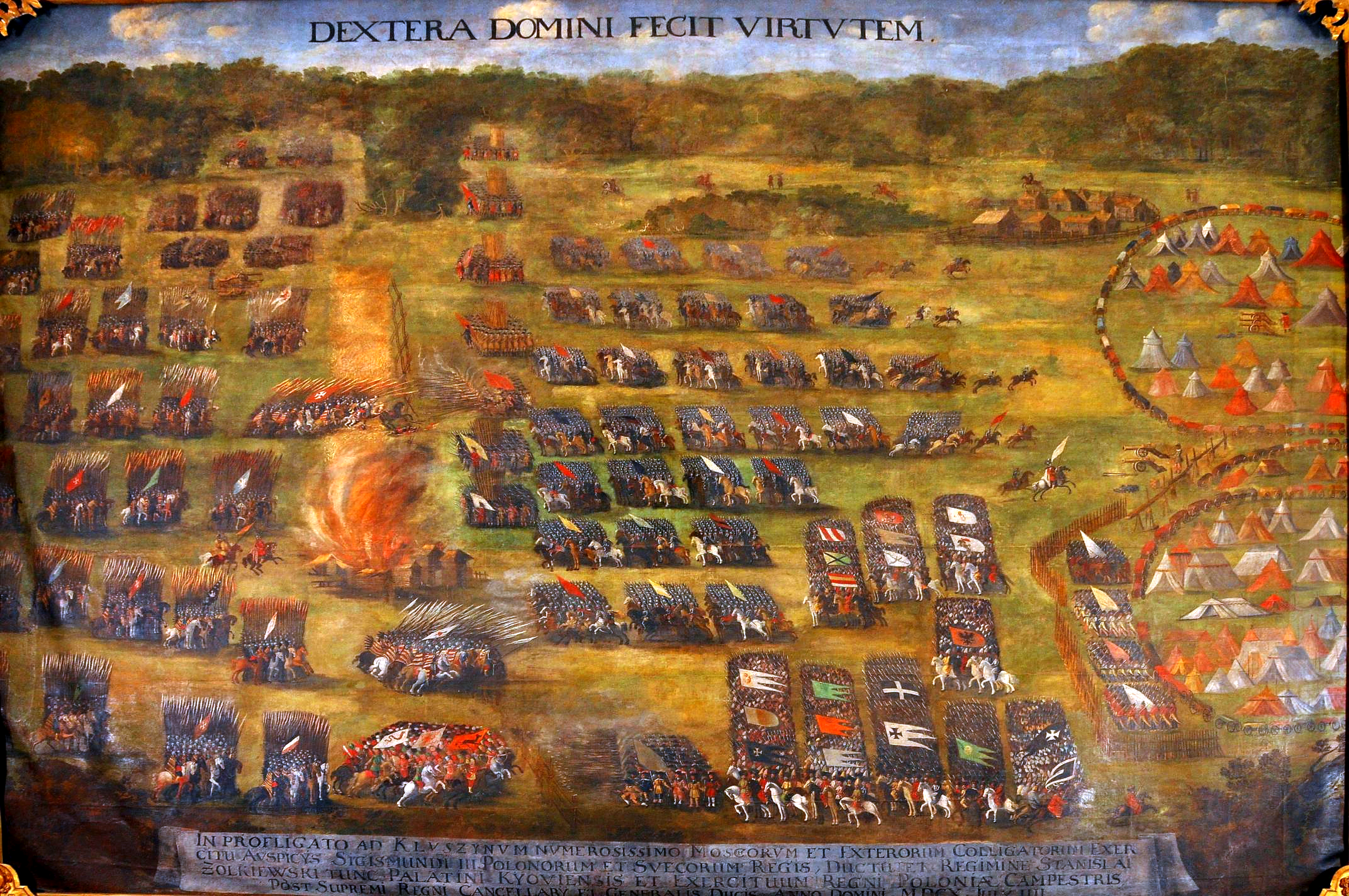
Battle of Klushino (1620) by Szymon Boguszowicz

== Aftermath ==
The main Russian army was then allowed to retreat, as Shuisky preferred not to reengage in hostilities – despite the advice of his other commanders to the contrary. Meanwhile, the Polish were exhausted and more interested in looting the camp and (according to Podhorecki) did not attempt to stop the Russians. According to another account by Nagielski, they pursued the retreating Russians, inflicting several thousand casualties. The Poles took much loot and trophies, from luxury goods (gold, silver, furs) to military equipment (including all 11 Russian artillery pieces) to war trophies (several command flags and banners).

Overall, the battle lasted about five hours. Exists several estimates of the losses of the Russian-Swedish army, the version proposed by the Polish historian Sikora takes into account that the losses of the Swedes range from 200 to 2,000 people, and the losses of the Russians amounted to 2,000 as well. He estimates the Polish losses at 80 killed and 100 wounded. Other estimate give 5,000 for Shuisky army and 400 for Poles.

The battle is seen by modern historians as a decisive victory in the war, although contemporary accounts were less clear on this issue, and some tried to stress the importance of the Siege of Smolensk, commanded by the Polish-Lithuanian king Sigismund III Vasa, and downplay Żółkiewski's victory. Regardless, following the battle, Żółkiewski then turned back towards the Russians at Tsaryovo-Zaymishche, commanded by Valuyev, who after learning about the defeat of their relief force at Kluszyno decided to surrender. Soon after the battle, Tsar Vasili IV was ousted by the Seven Boyars and Żółkiewski entered Moscow with little opposition. The Seven Boyars then proclaimed the Polish-Lithuanian prince of the Commonwealth Władysław IV Waza as the new Tsar of Russia. He claimed the Tsar's title from 1610 to 1634 but never assumed the throne, as his father and Commonwealth king, Zygmunt III Waza, failed to negotiate a lasting agreement with the boyars; the Polish-Lithuanian garrison in Moscow was soon besieged and would surrender a year later.

The Battle of Klushino is commemorated on the Tomb of the Unknown Soldier, Warsaw, with the inscription "KŁUSZYN – MOSKWA 2 VII – 28 VIII 1610".
