= Dmitry Shuisky =

Russian boyar (died 1613)

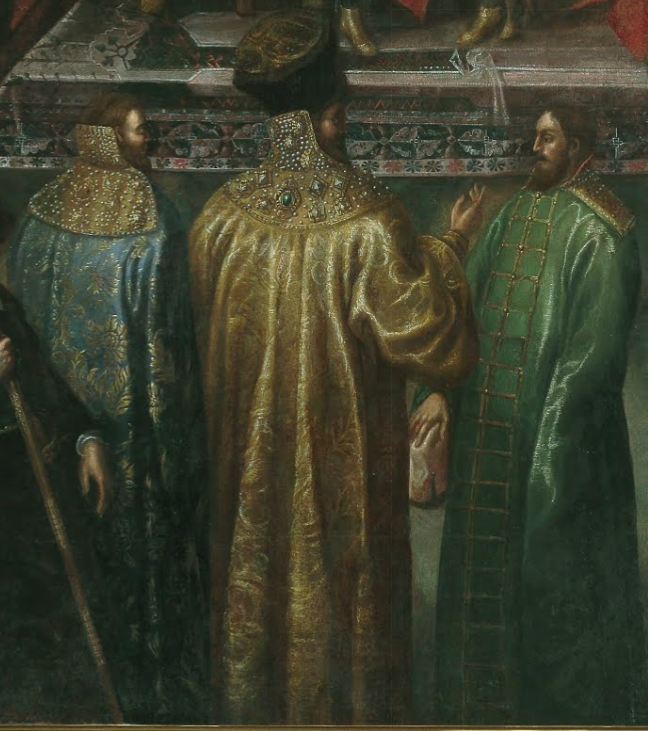
The captured brothers Shuisky being presented before King Sigismund III in 1611. Detail of a painting attributed to Tomaso Dolabella.

Prince Dmitry Ivanovich Shuisky (Russian: Дмитрий Иванович Шуйский; died 1613) was a Russian boyar from the Shuisky family, a younger brother to Vasily IV of Russia.

== Life ==
As a playmate of young Tsarevich Feodor Ivanovich, Dmitry was said to accompany him day and night in his devout wanderings from monastery to monastery. In 1584, his slandering of Prince Ivan Belsky led to riots in Moscow. Two years later, he was attested as a governor of Kargopol. On Fyodor's accession to the throne, he quarrelled with another boyar, Boris Godunov, and was expelled to his family patrimony in Shuya. Later, he made peace with Godunov and married his sister-in-law.

Shuisky is best remembered as a singularly incapable general. He was routed by False Dmitry I in 1606 and shared disgrace and imprisonment with his brother Vasily. When the latter was elected as the tsar, he put Dmitry in charge of the army which would lose its every battle against the Polish invaders and their allies. At last he was relieved of his duties and replaced with a young cousin, Mikhail Skopin-Shuisky, whom many regarded as the future tsar.

The rumour had it that Dmitry's wife poisoned Mikhail to ensure that the throne passed to him following the childless death of Vasily. This was cited as one of the reasons for Shuisky being snubbed by his soldiers and populace. In the Battle of Klushino he suffered an ignominious defeat: he was asleep when the battle started and escaped to Moscow barefoot. The Poles captured him and took with them to Warsaw, where he died in 1613.
