= Rybny =

Rybny (Russian: Ры́бный; masculine), Rybnaya (Ры́бная; feminine), or Rybnoye (Ры́бное; neuter) is the name of several inhabited localities in Russia.

Urban localities

- Rybnaya Sloboda, an urban locality and the administrative center of Rybno-Slobodsky District in the Republic of Tatarstan, Russia
- Rybnoye, Ryazan Oblast, a town in Rybnovsky District of Ryazan Oblast; administratively incorporated as a town of district significance

Rural localities

- Rybny, Republic of Mordovia, a settlement in Klyucharevsky Selsoviet of Ruzayevsky District of the Republic of Mordovia
- Rybny, Novgorod Oblast, a settlement in Kostkovskoye Settlement of Valdaysky District of Novgorod Oblast
- Rybny, Novosibirsk Oblast, a settlement in Krasnozyorsky District of Novosibirsk Oblast
- Rybny, Tambov Oblast, a settlement in Gavrilovsky 1-y Selsoviet of Gavrilovsky District of Tambov Oblast
- Rybny, Nikolayevsky District, Volgograd Oblast, a settlement in Levchunovsky Selsoviet of Nikolayevsky District of Volgograd Oblast
- Rybny, Serafimovichsky District, Volgograd Oblast, a khutor in Ust-Khopersky Selsoviet of Serafimovichsky District of Volgograd Oblast
- Rybny, Voronezh Oblast, a khutor in Karayashnikovskoye Rural Settlement of Olkhovatsky District of Voronezh Oblast
- Rybnoye, Kamensky District, Altai Krai, a selo in Rybinsky Selsoviet of Kamensky District of Altai Krai
- Rybnoye, Soloneshensky District, Altai Krai, a selo in Topolinsky Selsoviet of Soloneshensky District of Altai Krai
- Rybnoye, Kaliningrad Oblast, a settlement in Lugovskoy Rural Okrug of Guryevsky District of Kaliningrad Oblast
- Rybnoye, Kostroma Oblast, a settlement in Baksheyevskoye Settlement of Kostromskoy District of Kostroma Oblast
- Rybnoye, Motyginsky District, Krasnoyarsk Krai, a selo in Rybinsky Selsoviet of Motyginsky District of Krasnoyarsk Krai
- Rybnoye, Rybinsky District, Krasnoyarsk Krai, a selo in Rybinsky Selsoviet of Rybinsky District of Krasnoyarsk Krai
- Rybnoye, Almenevsky District, Kurgan Oblast, a selo in Rybnovsky Selsoviet of Almenevsky District of Kurgan Oblast
- Rybnoye, Tselinny District, Kurgan Oblast, a village in Frolovsky Selsoviet of Tselinny District of Kurgan Oblast
- Rybnoye, Moscow Oblast, a settlement in Yakotskoye Rural Settlement of Dmitrovsky District of Moscow Oblast
- Rybnoye, Nizhny Novgorod Oblast, a village in Pakalevsky Selsoviet of Tonkinsky District of Nizhny Novgorod Oblast
- Rybnoye, Sakhalin Oblast, a selo in Okhinsky District of Sakhalin Oblast
- Rybnoye, Tambov Oblast, a selo in Algasovsky Selsoviet of Morshansky District of Tambov Oblast
- Rybnoye, Voronezh Oblast, a selo in Krinichenskoye Rural Settlement of Ostrogozhsky District of Voronezh Oblast
- Rybnaya, a village in Chashinsky Selsoviet of Kargapolsky District of Kurgan Oblast

== See also ==
- Rybnovsky (disambiguation)
