= Pichugin, Volgograd Oblast =

Pichugin Пичугин
- Khutor
- Location within Volgograd Oblast Location within Russia
- Coordinates: 49°41′N 42°45′E
- Country: Russia
- Region: Volgograd Oblast
- District: Serafimovichsky District
- Time zone: UTC+4:00

Pichugin (Russian: Пичугин) is a rural locality (a khutor) in Zimnyatskoye Rural Settlement, Serafimovichsky District, Volgograd Oblast, Russia. The population was 119 as of 2010. There are 3 streets.

== Geography ==
Pichugin is located 15 km northeast of Serafimovich (the district's administrative centre) by road. Podolkhovsky is the nearest rural locality.
