= Poselsky =

Poselsky Посельский
- Khutor
- Location within Volgograd Oblast Location within Russia
- Coordinates: 49°49′N 43°12′E
- Country: Russia
- Region: Volgograd Oblast
- District: Serafimovichsky District
- Time zone: UTC+4:00

Poselsky (Russian: Посельский) is a rural locality (a khutor) in Terkinskoye Rural Settlement, Serafimovichsky District, Volgograd Oblast, Russia. The population was eight as of 2010. There are two streets.

== Geography ==
Poselsky is located on the Archeda River, 53 km northeast of Serafimovich (the district's administrative centre) by road. Nikulichev is the nearest rural locality.
