= Prilipkinsky =

Prilipkinsky Прилипкинский
- Khutor
- Location within Volgograd Oblast Location within Russia
- Coordinates: 49°36′N 42°49′E
- Country: Russia
- Region: Volgograd Oblast
- District: Serafimovichsky District
- Time zone: UTC+4:00

Prilipkinsky (Russian: Прилипкинский) is a rural locality (a khutor) in Otrozhkinskoye Rural Settlement, Serafimovichsky District, Volgograd Oblast, Russia. The population was 67 as of 2010. There are 5 streets.

== Geography ==
Prilipkinsky is located 89 km northeast of Serafimovich (the district's administrative centre) by road. Ostrozhki is the nearest rural locality.
