= Gorbatovsky =

Gorbatovsky Горбатовский
- Khutor
- Location within Volgograd Oblast Location within Russia
- Coordinates: 49°22′N 42°02′E
- Country: Russia
- Region: Volgograd Oblast
- District: Serafimovichsky District
- Time zone: UTC+4:00

Gorbatovsky (Russian: Горбатовский) is a rural locality (a khutor) and the administrative center of Gorbatovskoye Rural Settlement, Serafimovichsky District, Volgograd Oblast, Russia. The population was 364 as of 2010. There are 5 streets.

== Geography ==
Gorbatovsky is located 68 km southwest of Serafimovich (the district's administrative centre) by road. Gorbatov is the nearest rural locality.
