= Posyolok otdeleniya 2 sovkhoza Ust-Medveditsky =

Posyolok otdeleniya 2 sovkhoza Ust-Medveditsky Посёлок отделения № 2 совхоза «Усть-Медведицкий»
- Settlement
- Location within Volgograd Oblast Location within Russia
- Coordinates: 49°17′N 42°23′E
- Country: Russia
- Region: Volgograd Oblast
- District: Serafimovichsky District
- Time zone: UTC+4:00

Posyolok otdeleniya 2 sovkhoza Ust-Medveditsky (Russian: Посёлок отделения № 2 совхоза «Усть-Медведицкий») is a rural locality (a settlement) in Peschanovskoye Rural Settlement, Serafimovichsky District, Volgograd Oblast, Russia. The population was 59 as of 2010. There are 5 streets.

== Geography ==
The settlement is located 75 km southwest of Serafimovich (the district's administrative centre) by road. Peschany is the nearest rural locality.
