= Chernopolyansky =

Chernopolyansky Чернополянский
- Khutor
- Location within Volgograd Oblast Location within Russia
- Coordinates: 49°29′N 43°20′E
- Country: Russia
- Region: Volgograd Oblast
- District: Serafimovichsky District
- Time zone: UTC+4:00

Chernopolyansky (Russian: Чернополянский) is a rural locality (a khutor) in Kletsko-Pochtovskoye Rural Settlement, Serafimovichsky District, Volgograd Oblast, Russia. The population was 24 as of 2010. There are 3 streets.

== Geography ==
Chernopolyansky is located 85 km southeast of Serafimovich (the district's administrative centre) by road. Kremenskaya is the nearest rural locality.
