= Khovansky, Volgograd Oblast =

Khovansky Хованский
- Khutor
- Location within Volgograd Oblast Location within Russia
- Coordinates: 49°35′N 42°32′E
- Country: Russia
- Region: Volgograd Oblast
- District: Serafimovichsky District
- Time zone: UTC+4:00

Khovansky (Russian: Хованский) is a rural locality (a khutor) in Buyerak-Popovskoye Rural Settlement, Serafimovichsky District, Volgograd Oblast, Russia. The population was 169 as of 2010. There are 4 streets.

== Geography ==
Khovansky is located near the Don River, 20 km west of Serafimovich (the district's administrative centre) by road. Buyerak-Senyutkin is the nearest rural locality.
