= Terkin =

Terkin Теркин
- Khutor
- Location within Volgograd Oblast Location within Russia
- Coordinates: 49°44′N 43°07′E
- Country: Russia
- Region: Volgograd Oblast
- District: Serafimovichsky District
- Time zone: UTC+4:00

Terkin (Russian: Теркин) is a rural locality (a khutor) and the administrative center of Terkinskoye Rural Settlement, Serafimovichsky District, Volgograd Oblast, Russia. The population was 836 as of 2010. There are 15 streets.

== Geography ==
Terkin is located in steppe, 53 km northeast of Serafimovich (the district's administrative centre) by road. Orlinovsky is the nearest rural locality.
