= Kozinovsky =

Kozinovsky Козиновский
- Khutor
- Location within Volgograd Oblast Location within Russia
- Coordinates: 49°22′N 43°14′E
- Country: Russia
- Region: Volgograd Oblast
- District: Serafimovichsky District
- Time zone: UTC+4:00

Kozinovsky (Russian: Козиновский) is a rural locality (a khutor) in Kletsko-Pochtovskoye Rural Settlement, Serafimovichsky District, Volgograd Oblast, Russia. The population was 30 as of 2010. There are 3 streets.

== Geography ==
Kozinovsky is located 68 km southeast of Serafimovich (the district's administrative centre) by road. Logovsky is the nearest rural locality.
