= Gryaznushkin =

Gryaznushkin Грязнушкин
- Khutor
- Location within Volgograd Oblast Location within Russia
- Coordinates: 49°28′N 43°19′E
- Country: Russia
- Region: Volgograd Oblast
- District: Serafimovichsky District
- Time zone: UTC+4:00

Gryaznushkin (Russian: Грязнушкин) is a rural locality (a khutor) in Kletsko-Pochtovskoye Rural Settlement, Serafimovichsky District, Volgograd Oblast, Russia. The population was 3 as of 2010.

== Geography ==
Gryaznushkin is located 85 km southeast of Serafimovich (the district's administrative centre) by road. Chernopolyansky is the nearest rural locality.
