= Starosenyutkin =

Starosenyutkin Старосенюткин
- Khutor
- Location within Volgograd Oblast Location within Russia
- Coordinates: 49°14′N 42°16′E
- Country: Russia
- Region: Volgograd Oblast
- District: Serafimovichsky District
- Time zone: UTC+4:00

Starosenyutkin (Russian: Старосенюткин) is a rural locality (a khutor) in Proninskoye Rural Settlement, Serafimovichsky District, Volgograd Oblast, Russia. The population was 82 as of 2010. There are 6 streets.

== Geography ==
Starosenyutkin is located 184 km southwest of Serafimovich (the district's administrative centre) by road. Yagodny is the nearest rural locality.
