= Sebryakov =

Sebryakov Себряков
- Khutor
- Location within Volgograd Oblast Location within Russia
- Coordinates: 49°47′N 43°00′E
- Country: Russia
- Region: Volgograd Oblast
- District: Serafimovichsky District
- Time zone: UTC+4:00

Sebryakov (Russian: Себряков) is a rural locality (a khutor) in Tryasinovskoye Rural Settlement, Serafimovichsky District, Volgograd Oblast, Russia. The population was 2 as of 2010.

== Geography ==
Sebryakov is located in steppe, 5 km from the left bank of the Medveditsa River, 35 km northeast of Serafimovich (the district's administrative centre) by road. Podgorny is the nearest rural locality.
