= Bobrovsky 1-y =

Bobrovsky 1-y Бобровский 1-й
- Khutor
- Location within Volgograd Oblast Location within Russia
- Coordinates: 49°35′N 42°19′E
- Country: Russia
- Region: Volgograd Oblast
- District: Serafimovichsky District
- Time zone: UTC+4:00

Bobrovsky 1-y (Russian: Бобровский 1-й) is a rural locality (a khutor) in Ust-Khopyorskoye Rural Settlement, Serafimovichsky District, Volgograd Oblast, Russia. The population was 190 as of 2010. There are 5 streets.

== Geography ==
Bobrovsky 1-y is located 47 km west of Serafimovich (the district's administrative centre) by road. Zimovnoy is the nearest rural locality.
