= Podolkhovsky =

Podolkhovsky Подольховский
- Khutor
- Location within Volgograd Oblast Location within Russia
- Coordinates: 49°41′N 42°47′E
- Country: Russia
- Region: Volgograd Oblast
- District: Serafimovichsky District
- Time zone: UTC+4:00

Podolkhovsky (Russian: Подольховский) is a rural locality (a khutor) in Zimnyatskoye Rural Settlement, Serafimovichsky District, Volgograd Oblast, Russia. The population was 127 as of 2010. There are 4 streets.

== Geography ==
Podolkhovsky is located in forest, 15 km northeast of Serafimovich (the district's administrative centre) by road. Pichugin is the nearest rural locality.
