= Krutovsky =

Krutovsky Крутовский
- Khutor
- Location within Volgograd Oblast Location within Russia
- Coordinates: 49°35′N 42°13′E
- Country: Russia
- Region: Volgograd Oblast
- District: Serafimovichsky District
- Time zone: UTC+4:00

Krutovsky (Russian: Крутовский) is a rural locality (a khutor) and the administrative center of Krutovskoye Rural Settlement, Serafimovichsky District, Volgograd Oblast, Russia. The population was 521 as of 2010. There are 14 streets.

== Geography ==
Krutovsky is located 51 km west of Serafimovich (the district's administrative centre) by road. Yelansky is the nearest rural locality.
