= Nizhnyanka =

Nizhnyanka Нижнянка
- Khutor
- Location within Volgograd Oblast Location within Russia
- Coordinates: 49°52′N 43°10′E
- Country: Russia
- Region: Volgograd Oblast
- District: Serafimovichsky District
- Time zone: UTC+4:00

Nizhnyanka (Russian: Нижнянка) is a rural locality (a khutor) in Terkinskoye Rural Settlement, Serafimovichsky District, Volgograd Oblast, Russia. The population was 24 as of 2010. There are 2 streets.

== Geography ==
Nizhnyanka is located 49 km northeast of Serafimovich (the district's administrative centre) by road. Kundryuchkin is the nearest rural locality.
