= Druzhilinsky =

Druzhilinsky Дружилинский
- Khutor
- Location within Volgograd Oblast Location within Russia
- Coordinates: 49°21′N 43°11′E
- Country: Russia
- Region: Volgograd Oblast
- District: Serafimovichsky District
- Time zone: UTC+4:00

Druzhilinsky (Russian: Дружилинский) is a rural locality (a khutor) in Kletsko-Pochtovskoye Rural Settlement, Serafimovichsky District, Volgograd Oblast, Russia. The population was 2 as of 2010.

== Geography ==
Druzhilinsky is located 64 km southeast of Serafimovich (the district's administrative centre) by road. Kozinovsky is the nearest rural locality.
