= Chumakov, Volgograd Oblast =

Chumakov Чумаков
- Khutor
- Location within Volgograd Oblast Location within Russia
- Coordinates: 49°47′N 42°59′E
- Country: Russia
- Region: Volgograd Oblast
- District: Serafimovichsky District
- Time zone: UTC+4:00

Chumakov (Russian: Чумаков) is a rural locality (a khutor) in Tryasinovskoye Rural Settlement, Serafimovichsky District, Volgograd Oblast, Russia. The population was 11 as of 2010. There are 2 streets.

== Geography ==
Chumakov is located 35 km northeast of Serafimovich (the district's administrative centre) by road. Perepolsky is the nearest rural locality.
