= Bazki =

Bazki Базки
- Khutor
- Location within Volgograd Oblast Location within Russia
- Coordinates: 49°25′N 42°45′E
- Country: Russia
- Region: Volgograd Oblast
- District: Serafimovichsky District
- Time zone: UTC+4:00

Bazki (Russian: Базки) is a rural locality (a khutor) in Bobrovskoye Rural Settlement, Serafimovichsky District, Volgograd Oblast, Russia. The population was 280 as of 2010. There are 7 streets.

== Geography ==
Bazki is located on the Belaya Nemukha River, 22 km south of Serafimovich (the district's administrative centre) by road. Rastopinskaya is the nearest rural locality.
