= Nikulichev =

Nikulichev Никуличев
- Khutor
- Location within Volgograd Oblast Location within Russia
- Coordinates: 49°47′N 43°13′E
- Country: Russia
- Region: Volgograd Oblast
- District: Serafimovichsky District
- Time zone: UTC+4:00

Nikulichev (Russian: Никуличев) is a rural locality (a khutor) in Terkinskoye Rural Settlement, Serafimovichsky District, Volgograd Oblast, Russia. The population was 18 as of 2010. There are 3 streets.

== Geography ==
Nikulichev is located on the Archeda River, 58 km northeast of Serafimovich (the district's administrative centre) by road. Poselsky is the nearest rural locality.
