= Kundryuchkin =

Kundryuchkin Кундрючкин
- Khutor
- Location within Volgograd Oblast Location within Russia
- Coordinates: 49°51′N 43°11′E
- Country: Russia
- Region: Volgograd Oblast
- District: Serafimovichsky District
- Time zone: UTC+4:00

Kundryuchkin (Russian: Кундрючкин) is a rural locality (a khutor) in Terkinskoye Rural Settlement, Serafimovichsky District, Volgograd Oblast, Russia. The population was 11 as of 2010.

== Geography ==
Kundryuchkin is located 52 km northeast of Serafimovich (the district's administrative centre) by road. Nizhnyanka is the nearest rural locality.
