= Grushin, Volgograd Oblast =

Grushin Грушин
- Khutor
- Location within Volgograd Oblast Location within Russia
- Coordinates: 49°41′N 42°49′E
- Country: Russia
- Region: Volgograd Oblast
- District: Serafimovichsky District
- Time zone: UTC+4:00

Grushin (Russian: Грушин) is a rural locality (a khutor) in Zimnyatskoye Rural Settlement, Serafimovichsky District, Volgograd Oblast, Russia. The population was 120 as of 2010. There are 2 streets.

== Geography ==
Grushin is located 17 km northeast of Serafimovich (the district's administrative centre) by road. Zimnyatsky is the nearest rural locality.
