= Yendovsky, Serafimovichsky District, Volgograd Oblast =

Yendovsky Ендовский
- Khutor
- Location within Volgograd Oblast Location within Russia
- Coordinates: 49°38′N 43°04′E
- Country: Russia
- Region: Volgograd Oblast
- District: Serafimovichsky District
- Time zone: UTC+4:00

Yendovsky (Russian: Ендовский) is a rural locality (a khutor) in Kletsko-Pochtovskoye Rural Settlement, Serafimovichsky District, Volgograd Oblast, Russia. The population was 167 as of 2010. There are 3 streets.

== Geography ==
Yendovsky is located 64 km northeast of Serafimovich (the district's administrative centre) by road. Kletsko-Pochtovsky is the nearest rural locality.
