= Kepinsky =

Kepinsky Кепинский
- Khutor
- Location within Volgograd Oblast Location within Russia
- Coordinates: 49°49′N 43°03′E
- Country: Russia
- Region: Volgograd Oblast
- District: Serafimovichsky District
- Time zone: UTC+4:00

Kepinsky (Russian: Кепинский) is a rural locality (a khutor) in Tryasinovskoye Rural Settlement, Serafimovichsky District, Volgograd Oblast, Russia. The population was 133 as of 2010. There are 4 streets.

== Geography ==
Kepinsky is located 12 km south of Serafimovich (the district's administrative centre) by road. 2-y Bobrovsky is the nearest rural locality.
