= Pronin, Volgograd Oblast =

Pronin Пронин
- Khutor
- Location within Volgograd Oblast Location within Russia
- Coordinates: 49°12′N 42°12′E
- Country: Russia
- Region: Volgograd Oblast
- District: Serafimovichsky District
- Time zone: UTC+4:00

Pronin (Russian: Пронин) is a rural locality (a khutor) and the administrative center of Proninskoye Rural Settlement, Serafimovichsky District, Volgograd Oblast, Russia. The population was 844 as of 2010. There are 36 streets.

== Geography ==
Pronin is located 71 km southwest of Serafimovich (the district's administrative centre) by road. Varlamov is the nearest rural locality.
