= Orlinovsky =

Orlinovsky Орлиновский
- Khutor
- Location within Volgograd Oblast Location within Russia
- Coordinates: 49°44′N 43°09′E
- Country: Russia
- Region: Volgograd Oblast
- District: Serafimovichsky District
- Time zone: UTC+4:00

Orlinovsky (Russian: Орлиновский) is a rural locality (a khutor) in Terkinskoye Rural Settlement, Serafimovichsky District, Volgograd Oblast, Russia. The population was 171 as of 2010. There are 5 streets.

== Geography ==
Orlinovsky is located 57 km northeast of Serafimovich (the district's administrative centre) by road. Terkin is the nearest rural locality.
