= Novopavlovsky =

Novopavlovsky Новопавловский
- Khutor
- Location within Volgograd Oblast Location within Russia
- Coordinates: 49°09′N 42°14′E
- Country: Russia
- Region: Volgograd Oblast
- District: Serafimovichsky District
- Time zone: UTC+4:00

Novopavlovsky (Russian: Новопавловский) is a rural locality (a khutor) in Peschanovskoye Rural Settlement, Serafimovichsky District, Volgograd Oblast, Russia. The population was 83 as of 2010. There are 5 streets.

== Geography ==
Novopavlovsky is located 80 km southwest of Serafimovich (the district's administrative centre) by road. Pronin is the nearest rural locality.
