= Otrozhki =

Otrozhki Отрожки
- Khutor
- Location within Volgograd Oblast Location within Russia
- Coordinates: 49°34′N 42°50′E
- Country: Russia
- Region: Volgograd Oblast
- District: Serafimovichsky District
- Time zone: UTC+4:00

Otrozhki (Russian: Отрожки) is a rural locality (a khutor) and the administrative center of Otrozhkinskoye Rural Settlement, Serafimovichsky District, Volgograd Oblast, Russia. The population was 543 as of 2010. There are 12 streets.

== Geography ==
Otrozhki is located 85 km east of Serafimovich (the district's administrative centre) by road. Prilipkinsky is the nearest rural locality.
