= Perepolsky =

Perepolsky Перепольский
- Khutor
- Location within Volgograd Oblast Location within Russia
- Coordinates: 49°47′N 42°58′E
- Country: Russia
- Region: Volgograd Oblast
- District: Serafimovichsky District
- Time zone: UTC+4:00

Perepolsky (Russian: Перепольский) is a rural locality (a khutor) in Tryasinovskoye Rural Settlement, Serafimovichsky District, Volgograd Oblast, Russia. The population was 18 as of 2010.

== Geography ==
Perepolsky is located 34 km northeast of Serafimovich (the district's administrative centre) by road. Gryazinovsky is the nearest rural locality.
