= Khokhlachev =

Khokhlachev Хохлачев
- Khutor
- Location within Volgograd Oblast Location within Russia
- Coordinates: 49°07′N 42°05′E
- Country: Russia
- Region: Volgograd Oblast
- District: Serafimovichsky District
- Time zone: UTC+4:00

Khokhlachev (Russian: Хохлачев) is a rural locality (a khutor) in Proninskoye Rural Settlement, Serafimovichsky District, Volgograd Oblast, Russia. The population was 101 as of 2010. There are 4 streets.

== Geography ==
Khokhlachev is located 85 km southwest of Serafimovich (the district's administrative centre) by road. Pichugin is the nearest rural locality.
