= Tryasinovsky =

Tryasinovsky Трясиновский
- Khutor
- Location within Volgograd Oblast Location within Russia
- Coordinates: 49°46′N 42°58′E
- Country: Russia
- Region: Volgograd Oblast
- District: Serafimovichsky District
- Time zone: UTC+4:00

Tryasinovsky (Russian: Трясиновский) is a rural locality (a khutor) and the administrative center of Tryasinovskoye Rural Settlement, Serafimovichsky District, Volgograd Oblast, Russia. The population was 673 as of 2010. There are 18 streets.

== Geography ==
Tryasinovsky is located 32 km northeast of Serafimovich (the district's administrative centre) by road. Gryazinovsky is the nearest rural locality.
