= Ignatov, Volgograd Oblast =

Ignatov Игнатов
- Khutor
- Location within Volgograd Oblast Location within Russia
- Coordinates: 49°45′N 43°10′E
- Country: Russia
- Region: Volgograd Oblast
- District: Serafimovichsky District
- Time zone: UTC+4:00

Ignatov (Russian: Игнатов) is a rural locality (a khutor) in Terkinskoye Rural Settlement, Serafimovichsky District, Volgograd Oblast, Russia. The population was 118 as of 2010. There are 2 streets.

== Geography ==
Ignatov is located in steppe, 61 km northeast of Serafimovich (the district's administrative centre) by road. Orlinovsky is the nearest rural locality.
