= Zatonsky, Volgograd Oblast =

Zatonsky Затонский
- Khutor
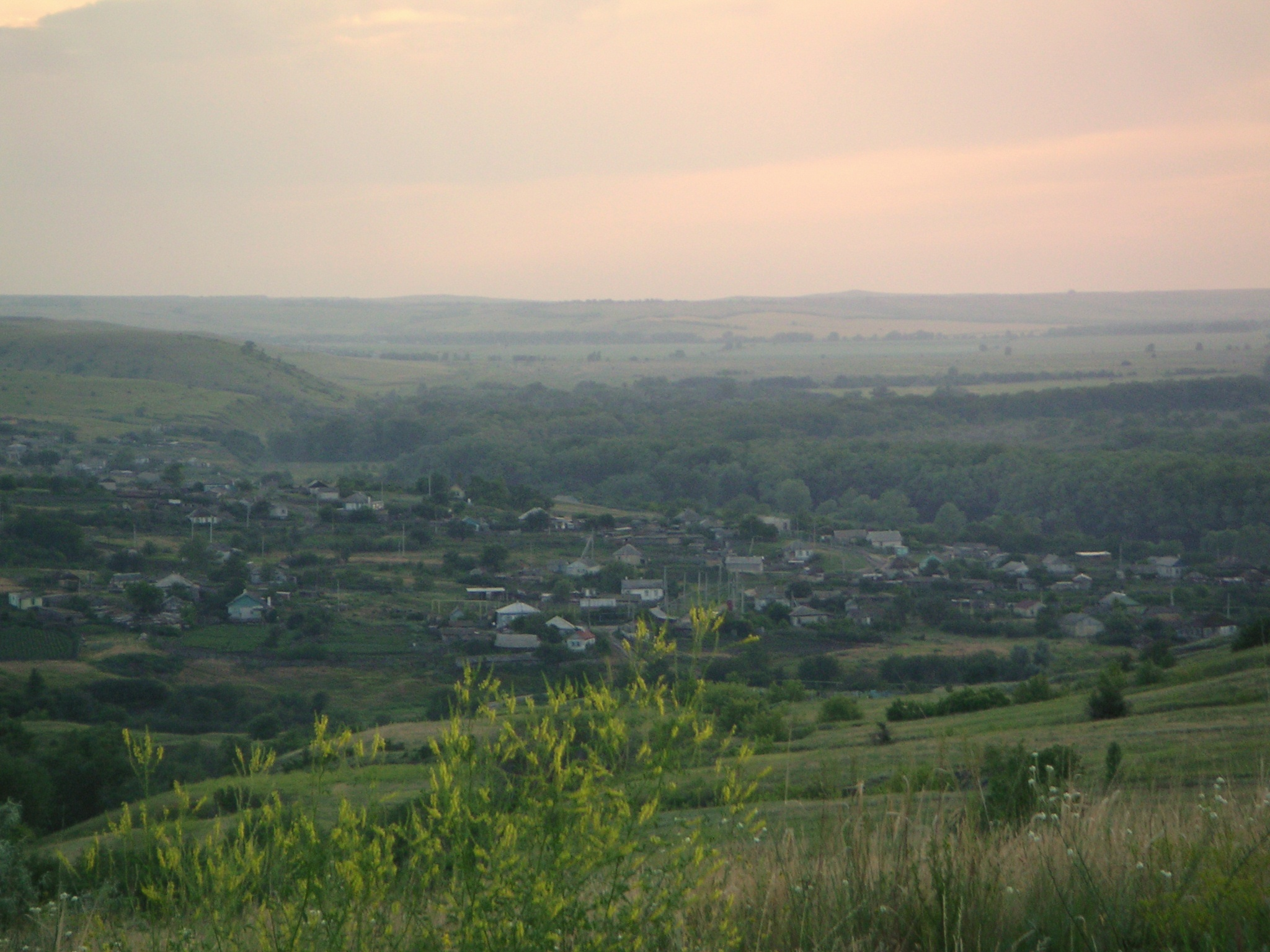
- Zatonsky in 2004

- Location within Volgograd Oblast Location within Russia
- Coordinates: 49°33′N 42°40′E
- Country: Russia
- Region: Volgograd Oblast
- District: Serafimovichsky District
- Time zone: UTC+4:00

Zatonsky (Russian: Затонский) is a rural locality (a khutor) in Buyerak-Popovskoye Rural Settlement, Serafimovichsky District, Volgograd Oblast, Russia. The population was 180 as of 2010. There are 4 streets.

== Geography ==
Zatonsky is located south from Don River, 11 km southwest of Serafimovich (the district's administrative centre) by road. Serafimovich is the nearest rural locality.
