= Malakhov, Volgograd Oblast =

Malakhov Малахов
- Khutor
- Location within Volgograd Oblast Location within Russia
- Coordinates: 49°08′N 42°07′E
- Country: Russia
- Region: Volgograd Oblast
- District: Serafimovichsky District
- Time zone: UTC+4:00

Malakhov (Russian: Малахов) is a rural locality (a khutor) in Proninskoye Rural Settlement, Serafimovichsky District, Volgograd Oblast, Russia. The population was 57 as of 2010. There are 4 streets.

== Geography ==
Malakhov is located 83 km southwest of Serafimovich (the district's administrative centre) by road. Khokhlachev is the nearest rural locality.
