= Gryazinovsky =

Gryazinovsky Грязиновский
- Khutor
- Location within Volgograd Oblast Location within Russia
- Coordinates: 49°46′N 42°58′E
- Country: Russia
- Region: Volgograd Oblast
- District: Serafimovichsky District
- Time zone: UTC+4:00

Gryazinovsky (Russian: Грязиновский) is a rural locality (a khutor) in Tryasinovskoye Rural Settlement, Serafimovichsky District, Volgograd Oblast, Russia. The population was 38 as of 2010.

== Geography ==
Gryazinovsky is located 33 km northeast of Serafimovich (the district's administrative centre) by road. Perepolsky is the nearest rural locality.
