= Ugolsky, Serafimovichsky District, Volgograd Oblast =

Ugolsky Угольский
- Khutor
- Location within Volgograd Oblast Location within Russia
- Coordinates: 49°31′N 42°49′E
- Country: Russia
- Region: Volgograd Oblast
- District: Serafimovichsky District
- Time zone: UTC+4:00

Ugolsky (Russian: Угольский) is a rural locality (a khutor) in Otrozhkinskoye Rural Settlement, Serafimovichsky District, Volgograd Oblast, Russia. The population was 86 as of 2010. There are 3 streets.

== Geography ==
Ugolsky is located 90 km southeast of Serafimovich (the district's administrative centre) by road. Otrozhki is the nearest rural locality.
