= Zimovnoy =

Zimovnoy Зимовной
- Khutor
- Location within Volgograd Oblast Location within Russia
- Coordinates: 49°36′N 42°17′E
- Country: Russia
- Region: Volgograd Oblast
- District: Serafimovichsky District
- Time zone: UTC+4:00

Zimovnoy (Russian: Зимовной) is a rural locality (a khutor) in Ust-Khopyorskoye Rural Settlement, Serafimovichsky District, Volgograd Oblast, Russia. The population was 80 as of 2010. There are 4 streets.

== Geography ==
Zimovnoy is located on the Don River, 49 km west of Serafimovich (the district's administrative centre) by road. 1-y Bobrovsky is the nearest rural locality.
