= Alexandra Pavlovna Botkina =

Russian art historian (1867–1959)

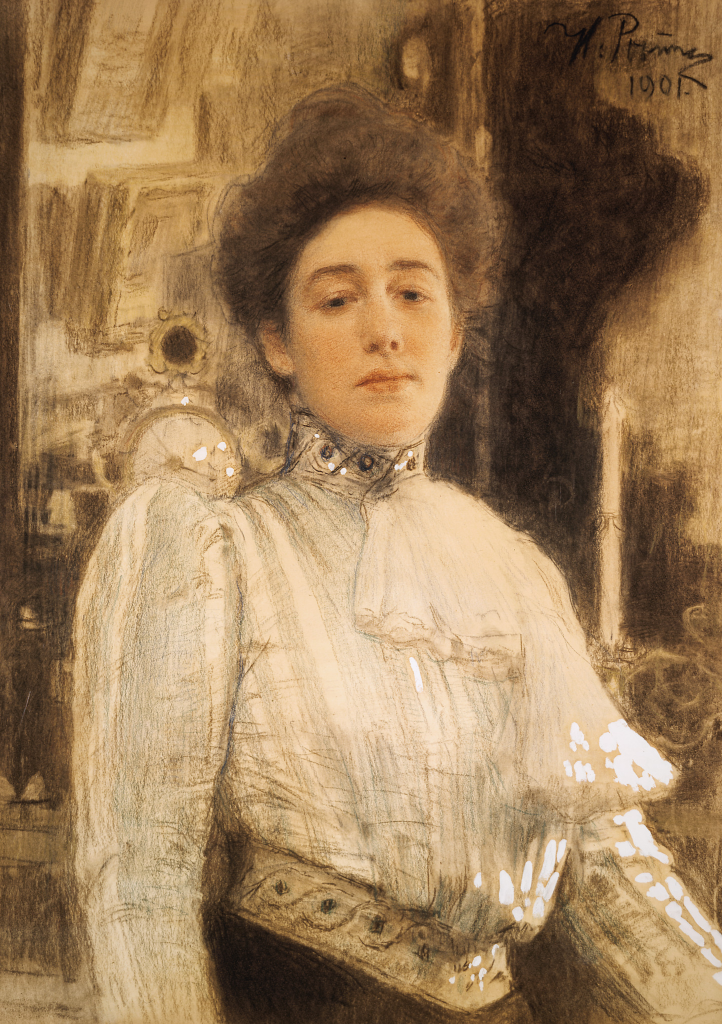
- Born: 1867; Moscow, Russian Empire
- Died: 1959 (aged 91–92); Moscow, Soviet Union
- Resting place: Novodevichy Cemetery (row 14, section 1)
- Occupation: Art historian
- Spouse: Sergei Sergeevich Botkin (since 1890; died 1910)
- Children: daughters: Alexandra (1891–1985) and Anastasia (1892–1942)
- Parents: Pavel Tretyakov (father); Vera Nikolaevna Tretyakova (mother)

Alexandra Pavlovna Botkina (Russian: Александра Павловна Боткина; née Tretyakova (Третьякова); 1867–1959) was a Russian art historian and museum professional associated with the Russian Silver Age.

== Early life and background ==
Botkina was born in 1867 to the art collector Pavel Tretyakov and Vera Nikolaevna Mamontova (1844–1899), a member of a prominent merchant family and a cousin of the philanthropist Savva Mamontov. Her mother played an active role in introducing her children to artistic and cultural life, organizing visits to theatres, museums, and concerts in Moscow and during travels in Europe. She was also involved in charitable activities, including support for educational institutions.

She was five years old when the Tretyakov Gallery was established on Lavrushinsky Lane. She subsequently devoted much of her life to studying the history of its collections. After Tretyakov’s death in 1898, she became involved in the administration of the gallery. According to correspondence from the artist Ilya Repin, she was regarded as one of the most suitable members of the family to participate in its management, owing to her familiarity with her father’s plans and her knowledge of art. In this role, she systematized archival materials related to Tretyakov’s biography and participated in the selection of works for exhibitions and acquisitions.

== Career and activities ==
She remained associated with the Tretyakov Gallery for much of her life. A portrait of her painted by Ilya Repin in 1901 is preserved in the gallery’s collection. The work has been described by the art historian Dmitry Sarabyanov as conveying a refined and contemplative mood. Following its exhibition at a Peredvizhniki show, the artist Igor Grabar considered it among the more modern works presented in Saint Petersburg at the time.

== Personal life ==
After marrying the physician Sergei Botkin (1859–1910), a professor at the S. M. Kirov Military Medical Academy, she moved to the city. Their home became known for its cultural and social atmosphere, similar to that of the Tretyakov household in Moscow.

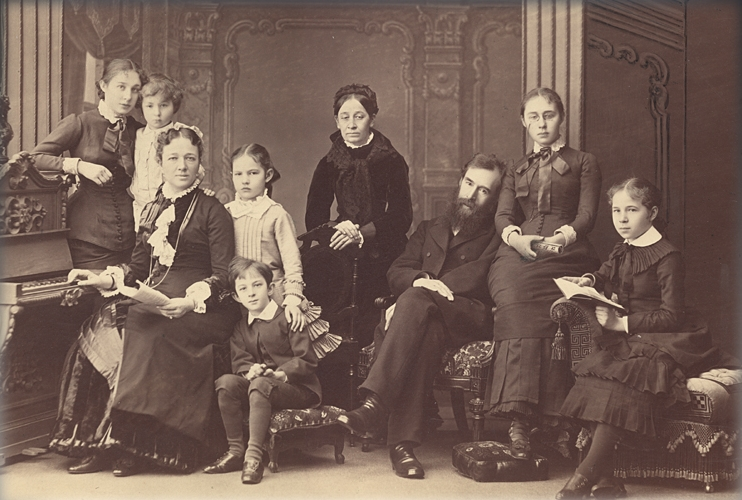
The Tretyakov family. Alexandra is second from the right, next to her father. 1884.

The couple had two daughters. Their elder daughter, Alexandra Khokhlova (1891–1985), became an actress and film director and later taught at the Gerasimov Institute of Cinematography. Their younger daughter, Anastasia Notgaft (1898–1942), worked in museum institutions and specialized in theatre iconography; she died during the Siege of Leningrad.

== Memoirs ==
After the Russian Revolution, the Botkin family residence in Saint Petersburg was nationalized, and Botkina returned to Moscow, where she resumed her work with the Tretyakov Gallery. She experienced financial hardship and separation from family members who had left the country.

In 1937, she began writing her memoirs, Pavel Mikhailovich Tretyakov in Life and Art, in which she described the development of the gallery, published family correspondence, and documented the collector’s relationships with artists. The work was later praised by the art historian Igor Grabar as an important contribution to the study of Russian cultural history.

== Death ==
Alexandra Pavlovna Botkina died in 1959 in Moscow. She was buried at the Novodevichy Cemetery. Members of the Tretyakov family, including her parents, are buried in the same section.
