= Rybny, Serafimovichsky District, Volgograd Oblast =

Rybny Рыбный
- Khutor
- Location within Volgograd Oblast Location within Russia
- Coordinates: 49°34′N 42°27′E
- Country: Russia
- Region: Volgograd Oblast
- District: Serafimovichsky District
- Time zone: UTC+4:00

Rybny (Russian: Рыбный) is a rural locality (a khutor) in Ust-Khopyorskoye Rural Settlement, Serafimovichsky District, Volgograd Oblast, Russia. The population was 203 as of 2010. There are 5 streets.

== Geography ==
Rybny is located 42 km west of Serafimovich (the district's administrative centre) by road. Ust-Khoperskaya is the nearest rural locality.
