= Rybnovsky =

Rybnovsky (masculine), Rybnovskaya (feminine), or Rybnovskoye (neuter) may refer to:

- Rybnovsky District, a district of Ryazan Oblast, Russia
- Rybnovskoye Urban Settlement, a municipal formation which the town of district significance of Rybnoye in Rybnovsky District of Ryazan Oblast, Russia is incorporated as
- Rybnovsky (rural locality), a rural locality (a settlement) in Morshansky District of Tambov Oblast, Russia
