= Lastushinsky =

Lastushinsky Ластушинский
- Khutor
- Location within Volgograd Oblast Location within Russia
- Coordinates: 49°26′N 43°01′E
- Country: Russia
- Region: Volgograd Oblast
- District: Serafimovichsky District
- Time zone: UTC+4:00

Lastushinsky (Russian: Ластушинский) is a rural locality (a khutor) in Kletsko-Pochtovskoye Rural Settlement, Serafimovichsky District, Volgograd Oblast, Russia. The population was 21 as of 2010. There are 2 streets.

== Geography ==
Lastushinsky is located 85 km southeast of Serafimovich (the district's administrative centre) by road. Podpeshinsky is the nearest rural locality.
