= Fedyakino =

Fedyakino (Russian: Федякино) is the name of several rural localities in Russia:

- Fedyakino, Moscow Oblast, a village in Savvinskoye Rural Settlement of Yegoryevsky District in Moscow Oblast; 55°25′N 39°14′E
- Fedyakino, Ryazan Oblast, a selo in Vakinsky Rural Okrug of Rybnovsky District in Ryazan Oblast
