= Vozha =

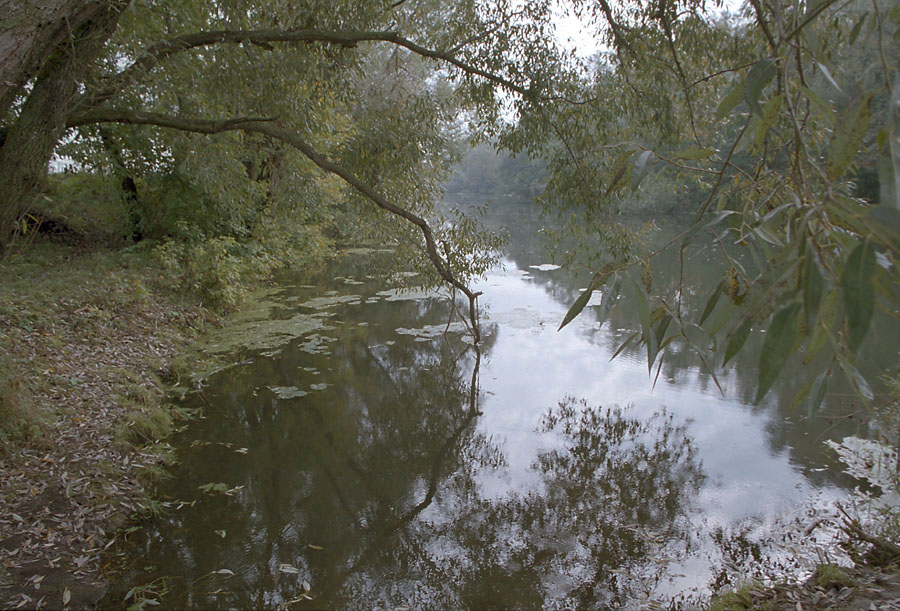
- Vozha at Rybnoye
- Native name: Вожа (Russian)

Location
- Country: Russia

Physical characteristics
- Mouth: Oka
  - coordinates: 54.7165°N 39.6924°E
- Length: 103 km (64 mi)
- Basin size: 1,590 km^{2} (610 sq mi)

Basin features
- Progression: Oka→ Volga→ Caspian Sea

The Vozha (Russian: Во́жа) is a river in Ryazan Oblast, Russia. It is a right tributary of the Oka. It is 103 kilometres (64 mi) long, and its drainage basin covers 1,590 square kilometres (610 mi^{2}).

The town of Rybnoye is situated by the Vozha.

In August 1378, Muscovite prince Dmitry Donskoy defeated a Mongol army in the Battle of the Vozha River.
