= Battle of the Vozha River =

1378 battle in Russia

Coordinates: 54°43′0″N 39°26′39″E

- Part of the Great Troubles
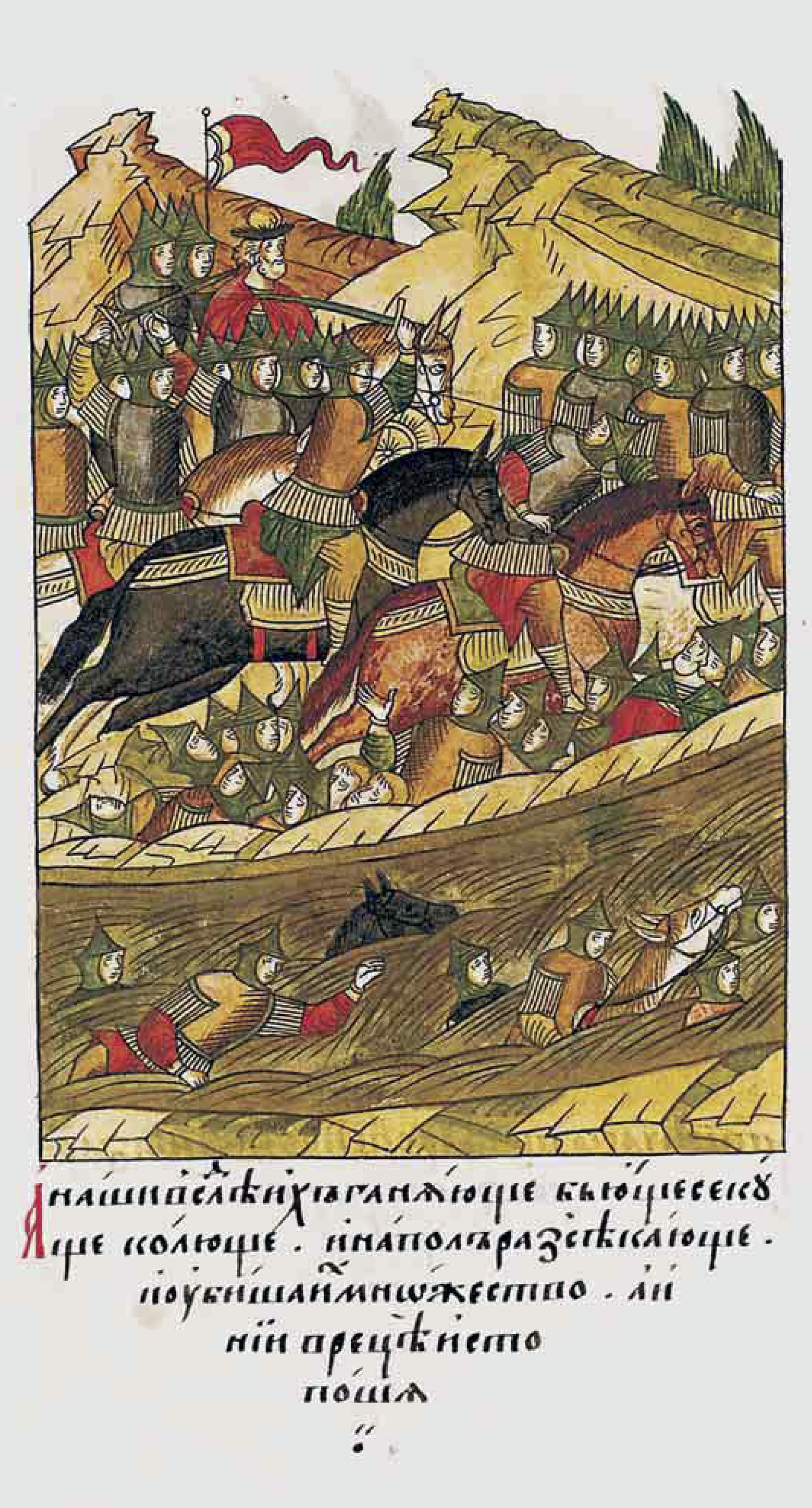
- 16th-century fantasy image of the battle
Date	11 August 1378
Location	Vozha River, Ryazan Oblast
Result	Muscovite victory

Belligerents
Grand Duchy of Moscow	Mamai's faction within the Golden Horde

Commanders and leaders
Dmitri Ivanovich of Moscow	Murza Begitch †; Khazibey †; Koverga †; Karabulug †; Kostrov †

Strength
5,000	20,000–50,000

Casualties and losses
Unknown	Entire army annihilated

The Battle of the Vozha River (Russian: Битва на реке Воже, romanized: Bitva na reke Vozhe) was a battle during the Great Troubles, fought between the Principality of Moscow and Mamai's faction within the Golden Horde on 11 August 1378. Mamai sought to punish Dmitri Ivanovich of Moscow (who had not yet received his nickname Donskoy) for refusing to pay the tribute.

== Battle ==
The Tatars were commanded by murza Begich. The two armies met near the river Vozha, a tributary of the Oka. After successful reconnaissance Dmitri managed to block the ford which the Tatars intended to use for the crossing of the river. He and his troops held a good position on a hill. The Russians' formation was in the shape of a bow with Donskoy leading the center and the flanks under the command of Timofey Velyaminov and Andrei of Polotsk.

After waiting a long time, Begich decided to cross the river and to encircle the Russians from both sides. However, the attack of the Tatar cavalry was repelled and the Russians went over to a counter-attack. The Tatars left their tracks and began retreating in disorder, many of them drowned in the river. Begich himself was killed.

The Vozha battle was the first serious victory of the Russians over a big army of the Golden Horde. It had a big psychological effect before the famous Battle of Kulikovo because it demonstrated the vulnerability of the Tatar cavalry which was unable to overcome tough resistance or withstand determined counter-attacks. For Mamai, the defeat of Vozha meant a direct challenge by Dmitry which caused him to start a new unsuccessful campaign two years later.

== Historiography ==
Historian A.V. Azovtsev, in his 2021 book «Боище, иже на Воже»: от бывальщины к небылице ("Boishche, izhe na Vozhe": from a true story to a fable), after analyzing the main primary source on the battle, Повесть о битве на реке Воже, as well as other chronicles, questions whether such a battle ever took place.

== Aftermath ==
Battle of Vozha was the first major success of Russian troops in front of the Mongols. After the battle, Mamai's army was almost completely destroyed and he had to replenish it with mercenaries for the Battle of Kulikovo in 1380.

== See also ==
- Great Troubles
- Tatar invasions
- Russo-Kazan Wars
- Principality of Moscow
- Mongol invasion of Kievan Rus'

== Bibliography ==
- Martin, Janet (2007). Medieval Russia: 980–1584. Second Edition. E-book. Cambridge: Cambridge University Press. ISBN 978-0-511-36800-4.
