= Rybno-Slobodsky District =

Rybno-Slobodsky District Рыбно-Слободский район (Russian)
- District

Other transcription(s)
  - Tatar: Балык Бистәсе районы
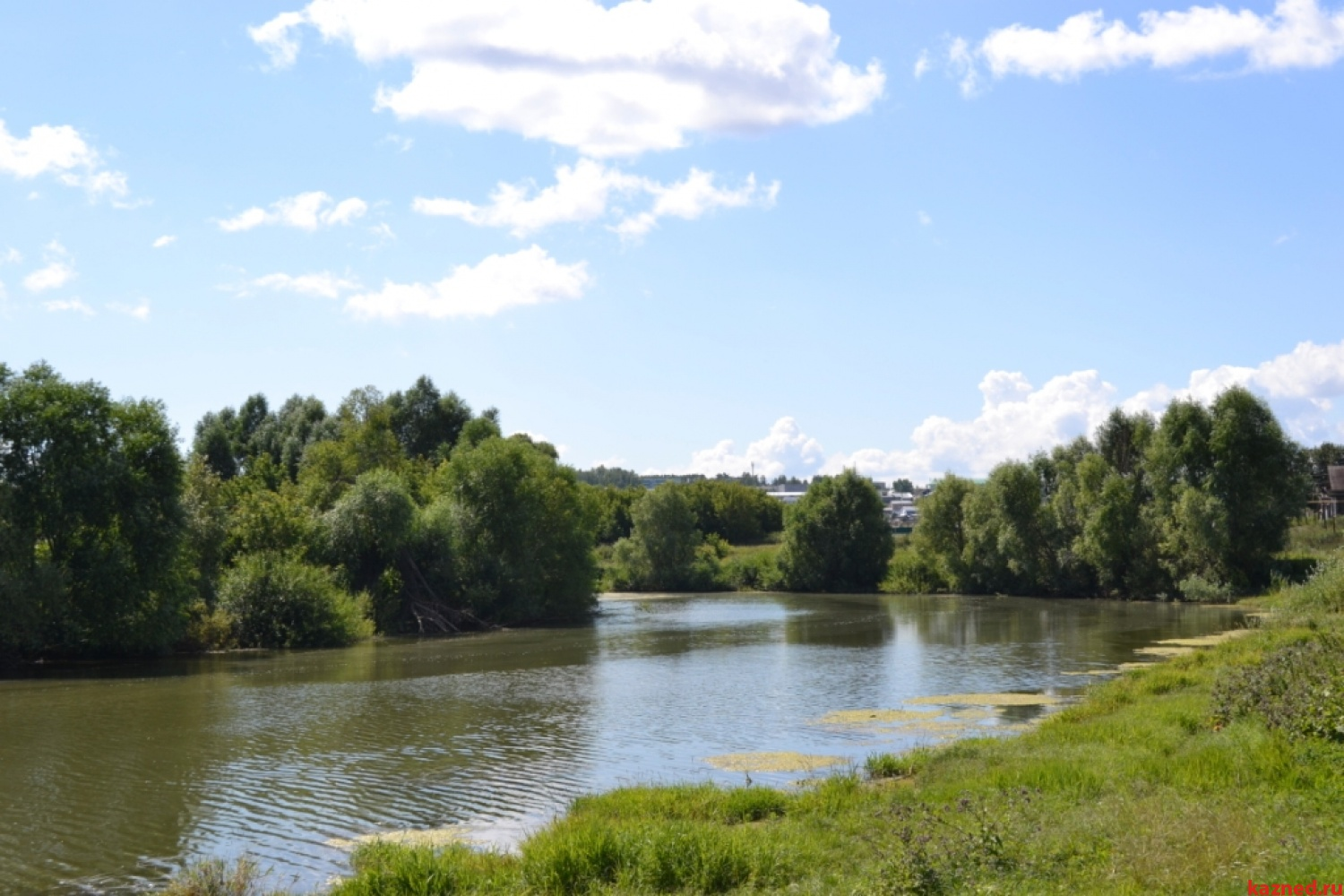
- Betka River, Rybno-Sobodsky District

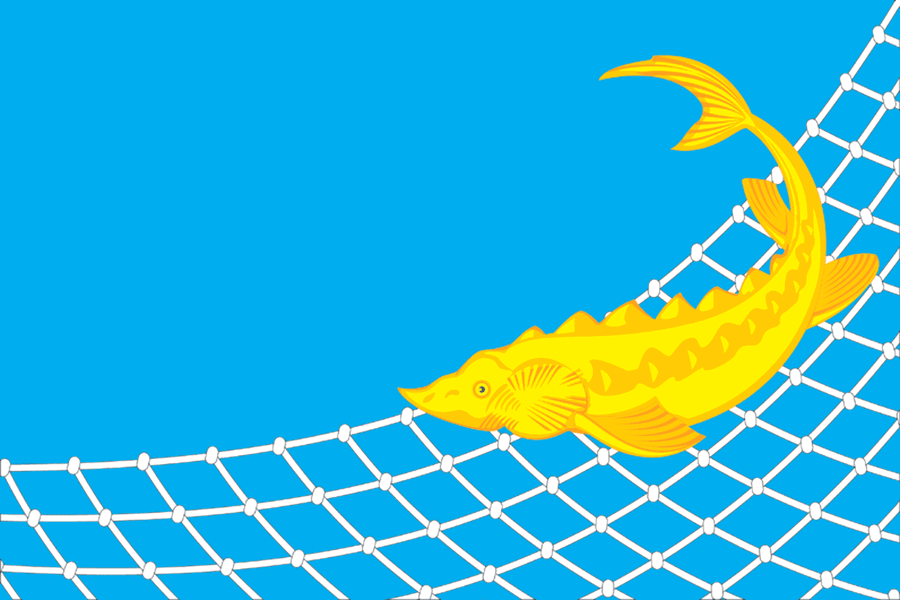
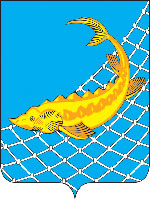
- Flag Coat of arms
- Location of Rybno-Slobodsky District in the Republic of Tatarstan
- Coordinates: 55°32′N 50°20′E
- Country: Russia
- Federal subject: Republic of Tatarstan
- Established: 14 February 1927
- Administrative center: Rybnaya Sloboda

Area
  - Total: 2,052 km^{2} (792 sq mi)

Population (2010 Census)
  - Total: 27,630
  - Density: 13.46/km^{2} (34.87/sq mi)
  - Urban: 27.8%
  - Rural: 72.2%

Administrative structure
  - Inhabited localities: 1 urban-type settlements, 77 rural localities

Municipal structure
  - Municipally incorporated as: Rybno-Slobodsky Municipal District
  - Municipal divisions: 1 urban settlements, 26 rural settlements
- Time zone: UTC+3 (MSK)
- OKTMO ID: 92650000
- Website: http://ribnaya-sloboda.tatarstan.ru/

Rybno-Slobodsky District (Russian: Ры́бно-Слобо́дский райо́н; Tatar: Балык Бистәсе районы) is a territorial administrative unit and municipal district of the Republic of Tatarstan within the Russian Federation. It is located in the central part of the republic, on the right bank of the Kama River. The administrative center is the urban-type settlement Rybnaya Sloboda. As of 2020, the district had a total population of 25,052 people. The total land area of the district is 2053 km^{2}.

The village of Rybnaya Sloboda was formed by the decree of Boris Godunov at the end of the 16th century. The settlement received its name in honor of the fishing industry widespread in the region, in which participated many residents of the Kama villages. The Rybno-Slobodsky district was formed as an administrative unit in 1927.

The region is predominantly agricultural with around 1181.1 km^{2} of land designated for agricultural use. Five large agricultural firms operate in the region, occupying 46% of agricultural land: Vamin Tatarstan, Krasny Vostok - Agro, Kulon, Ratsin, Saba Agro.

== Geography ==
In the north, the Rybno-Slobodsky district borders with the Pestrechinsky, Tyulyachinsky and Sabinsky districts, to the west it borders the Laishevsky district, and to the east the Mamadyshsky district. On the southern side, the region is separated by the river from the Chistopolsky and Alekseevsky districts of Tatarstan. The total land area of the district is 2053 km^{2} and its administrative center is located in the urban-type settlement Rybnaya Sloboda.

== Coat of arms ==
The emblems on the regional coat of arms symbolize fishing which is a traditional craft of local residents. The blue color emphasizes the importance of water resources for the economy of the region, as well as honor, nobility, spirituality. Openwork fishing nets are a symbol of the lace and jewellery crafts developed in the region: fish-settlement laces are distinguished by a clear pattern, with a predominance of geometric patterns. The gold color symbolizes harvest, wealth, stability, respect, and silver - purity, perfection, peace and understanding. The flag of the area was designed on the basis of the coat of arms and is a blue cloth, which depicts a white fishing net and a yellow beluga on the background.

== History ==
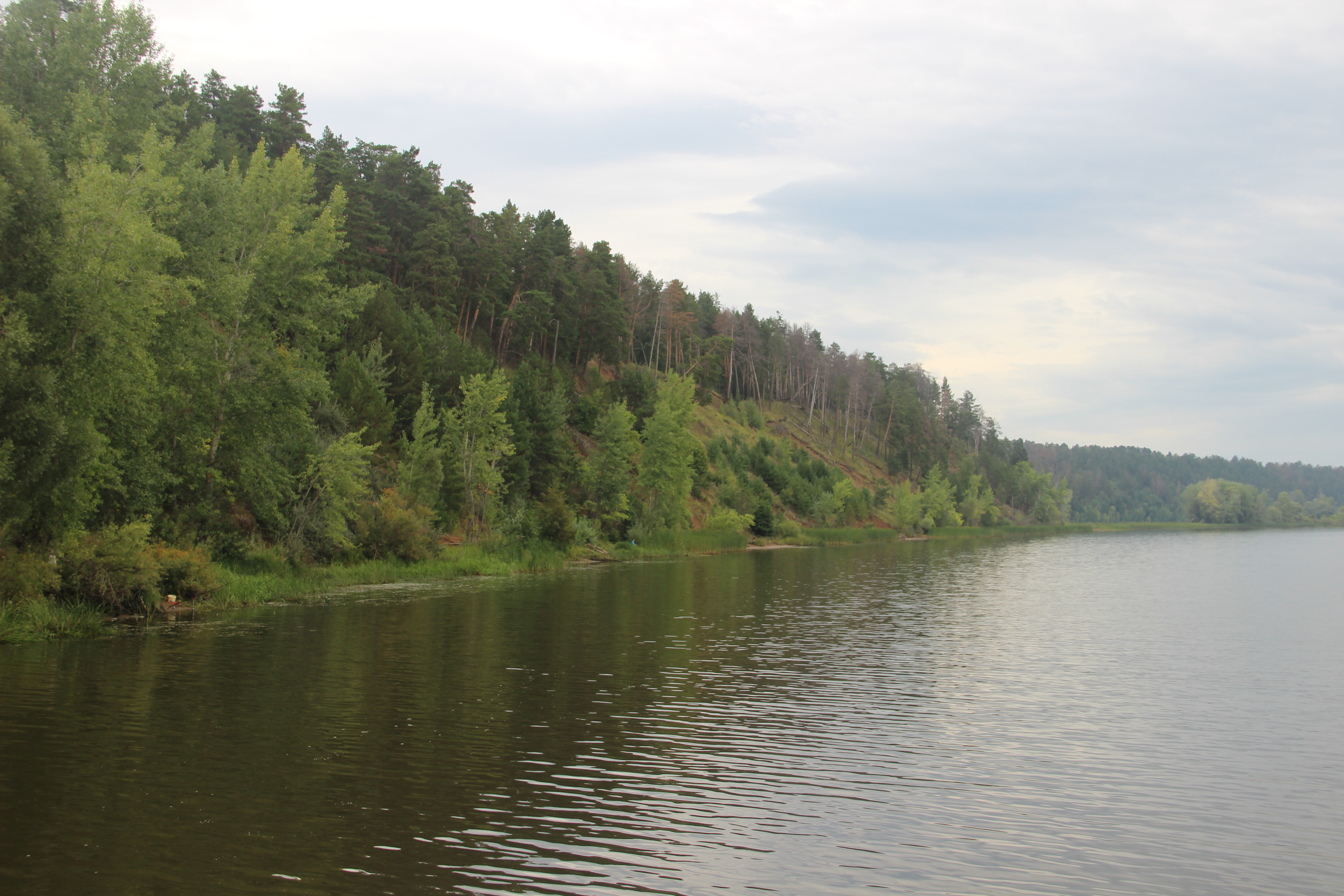
A view on the right bank of Kama

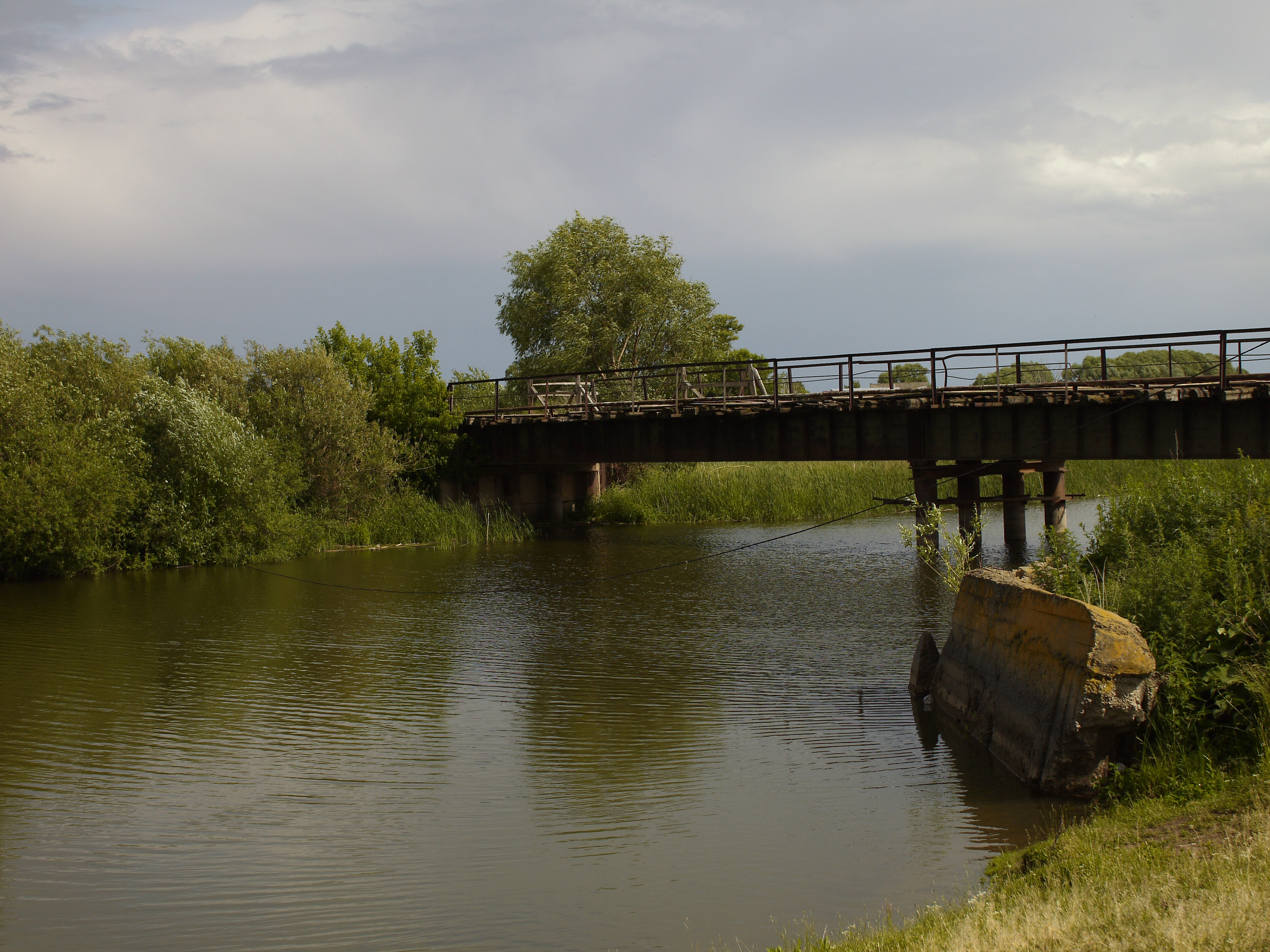
Russian Oshnyak

=== Background ===
The village Rybnaya Sloboda was formed at the end of the 16th century by the decree of Boris Godunov. It was erected near a fort which was intended to secure the external borders of the Russian state on the right bank of the Kama river. The settlement received its name in honor of the national fishing industry, which was practiced by many residents of the Kama villages.

Rybno-Slobodsky District as an administrative unit within the Tatar ASSR was formed on February 14, 1927. Until 1920 the territory was a part of the Laishevsky District and from 1920 to 1927 was included in the Laishevsky canton. On March 26, 1959, new territories which had previously belonged to the abolished Kzyl-Yulduz district were added to the Rybno-Slobodsky district. On January 4, 1963, the district was abolished and part of its territory transferred to the Mamadyshsky district. Yet already on January 12, 1965, the Rybno-Slobodskoy district was restored as an administrative division.

=== Modern Rybno-Slobodsky District ===
From 2008 to 2017, the Rybno-Slobodskoy district was headed by Ilham Valeev. He was removed from office as a result of numerous violations revealed in the course of an investigation by the anti-corruption department under the President of Tatarstan. Two years later, Valeev's former deputy, Rafik Gadeev was convicted of abuse of power. In 2018, Ildar Tazutdinov was appointed as the new head of the district.

== Population ==
As of 2020, the district had a population of 25,052. The ethnic composition of the region is 78.5% Tatars, 20% Russians, 1.5% other nationalities. In 2019, the Rybno-Slobodsky district recorded the worst fertility-to-mortality ratio in the region with elderly residents composing 26.5% of the population and the district death rate exceeded the birth rate by almost two times. The district also faces low birth rates with 153 children were born in 2016 and only 81 in 2017. Only 30.81% of the district's population lives in urban conditions (the village of Rybnaya Sloboda).

== Municipal-territorial structure ==
The Rybno-Slobodsky municipal district is divided into 1 urban and 26 rural settlements with 78 settlements within them.

Previously existing but abolished settlements of the region include the following: the villages of Bolshoi Atmas, Kolos, Nosovo and Tatarskoye Mordovo, and the villages of Baiteryakovo and Yamash.

== Economy ==
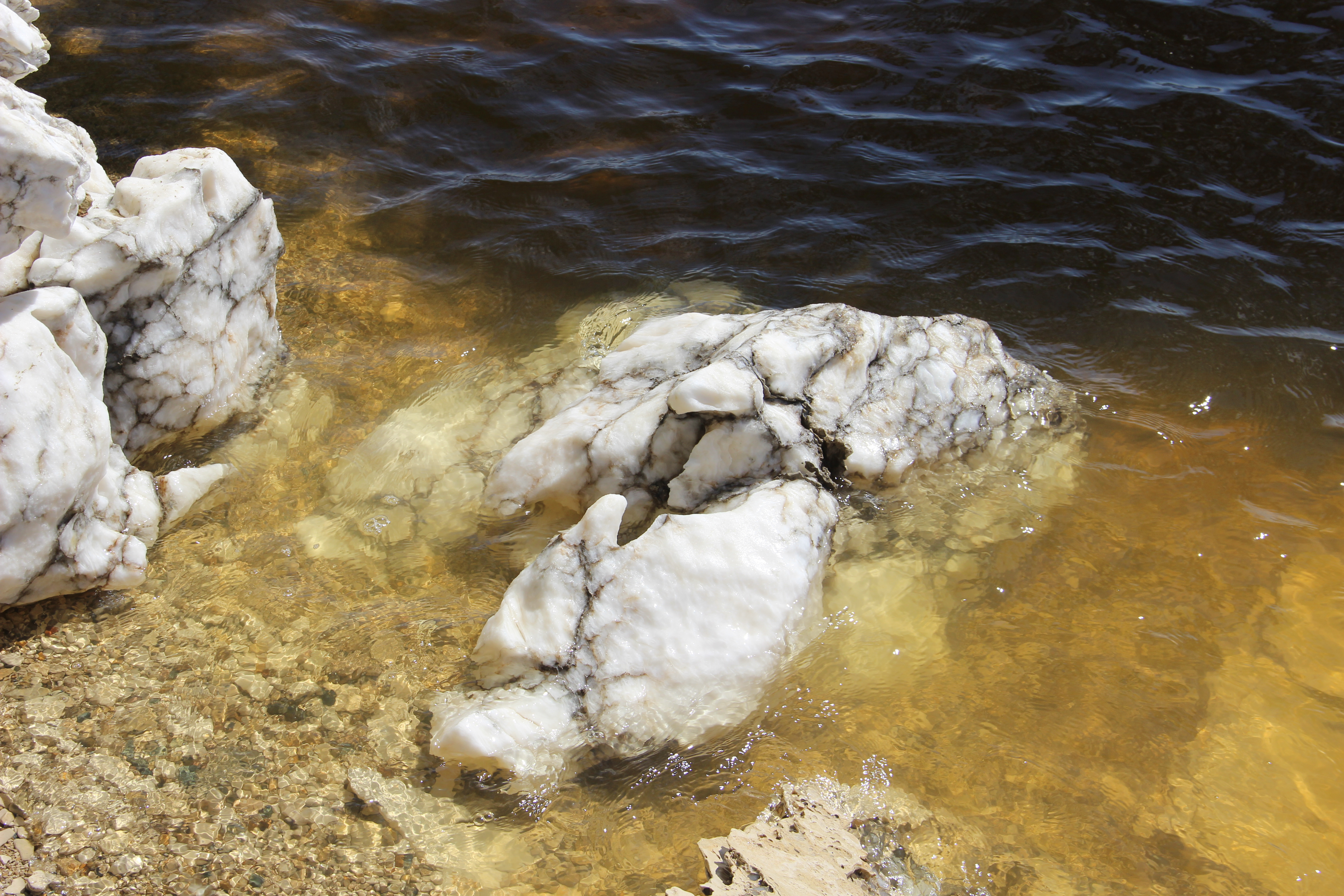
Calcite in the Kama region

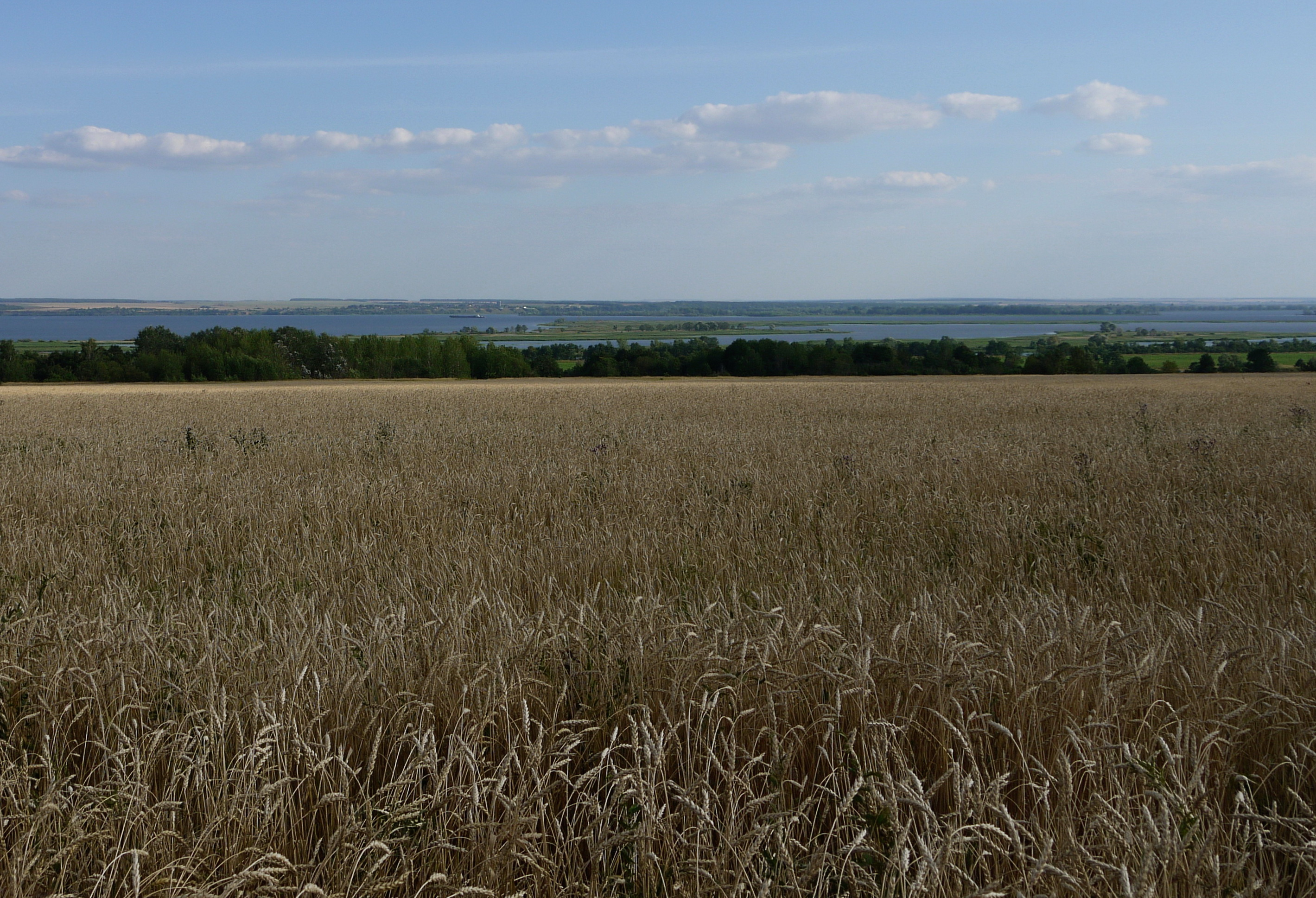
Local fields

The average monthly salary of employees in the district is 25 941 rubles. Salaries of employees of municipal institutions of culture and art earn 29 987 rubles while employees of municipal educational institutions receive an average of 18 260 rubles monthly.

There are several large industrial enterprises in the region including the Rybnoslobodsky butter-dairy plant, the fishery "Krug" (annual catch - about 160 tons) and the brick factory "Stroykeramika".

=== Agriculture ===
The agricultural industry in the region is focused on meat and dairy farming and crop production. Spring wheat, winter rye, barley, oats, peas, and corn are among the main crops cultivated in the region. The total area of agricultural land in the Rybno-Slobodsky district is 104.8 hectares, of which 84.6 hectares are arable land. There are 19 large and medium-sized agricultural enterprises, 77 peasant farms and 9704 private subsidiary plots. The number of cows in the district in 2019 amounted to 4,791 units (out of more than 200 thousand throughout the country).

Since 2016, the Rybno-Slobodsky district has been implementing a project of the Krasny Vostok agricultural holding for the production of marbled beef, which was supervised by State Duma deputy Ayrat Khairullin. Было объявлено о инвестициях в компанию в размере 1,3 млрд рублей. An investment in Krasny Vostok to the amount of 1.3 billion rubles was recently announced [36]. In 2019 the poultry enterprise "Rybno-Slobodskaya agrofirm " KAZ " specializing in geese breeding was opened on the territory of the Russian-Oshnyaksky rural settlement. The amount of declared investment for the first stage of construction amounted to 6 million rubles. Another large farm in the region, Krug, is engaged in fish farming and fish processing. The annual catch of the plant is about 160 tons; the plant smokes most of its catch and delivers it to stores ready-made. At the beginning of 2020, a plant for breeding African Clarius catfish and catching river fish "Clarius" was opened, where it is planned to farm up to 50 tons of fish per year. At the moment, the project has invested 12 million investments, the total planned amount is 15 million.

In 2012, the construction of a fish hatchery began using support from the republican sectoral program, eventually becoming associated with one of the largest corruption scandals in the region which lead to the dismissal of former head Ilham Valeev. Initially 73 million rubles were allocated for the project from the federal budget, 20 million from the Tatarstan budget. The beneficiaries of the project were the companies of Valeev's relatives. As a result of their embezzlement, construction was frozen due to lack of funds. After this incident, the president of the republic began to personally control the income of regional administrators.

=== Investment potential ===
Five large agricultural investment groups occupy 46% of the agricultural land in the region: the Rybno-Slobodsky butter-dairy plant "Vamin Tatarstan", the largest milk producer in the republic "Krasny Vostok - Agro", the agro-industrial center "RATSIN", and the foreign agricultural machinery concern " Sabagro "[3]. Their average investment volume is considered to be relatively small and amounts to 8,051 rubles per capitaя.

Since 2018, the district has been implementing a program to improve the working conditions for investors and entrepreneurs. For example, in the village of Bolshoy Mashlyak, an enterprise for the production of sweets was funded with investment attracted from Turkey. Another Turkish investor is Food Alliance, which is building a 100 hectare greenhouse complex. The total amount of declared investment in the project is 17 million rubles. Food Alliance is also the main investment partner of the Tatarstan Hectare project (70 million in investment) - a cooperative on an area of 200 hectares where farmers will be able to grow strawberries, raspberries and currants as well process and pack products on-site. In total, 13 major investors have been attracted to the district in 2018 bringing with them a total of 854 million rubles of investment.

In July 2020 the Agency for Tourism Development in Tatarstan announced plans to launch a grant program for the development of the Rybno-Slobodsky District. In this program, small and medium-sized businesses may apply for subsidies of up to 3 million rubles for the development of new tourist routes and tourism infrastructure, including the installation of signage, the creation of audio guide systems, general improvements, the development of a network of glamping sites and the purchase of required equipment. Within the framework of another republic investment project "Five Winds" in the region, there are plans to build a sports and recreation camp with an occupancy of 200, a sailing school, sports and cinema hall as well as an all-season park for active family recreation and a camp site for 120 people.

Meteorological studies were carried out in 2019 to assess the potential for wind power generation capacity and renewable energy investment in the region, which is located next to a large body of water, resulting in estimates of a potential for 600 MW of production capacity. As of 2020 construction of a wind farm is planned in the area.

=== Transport ===
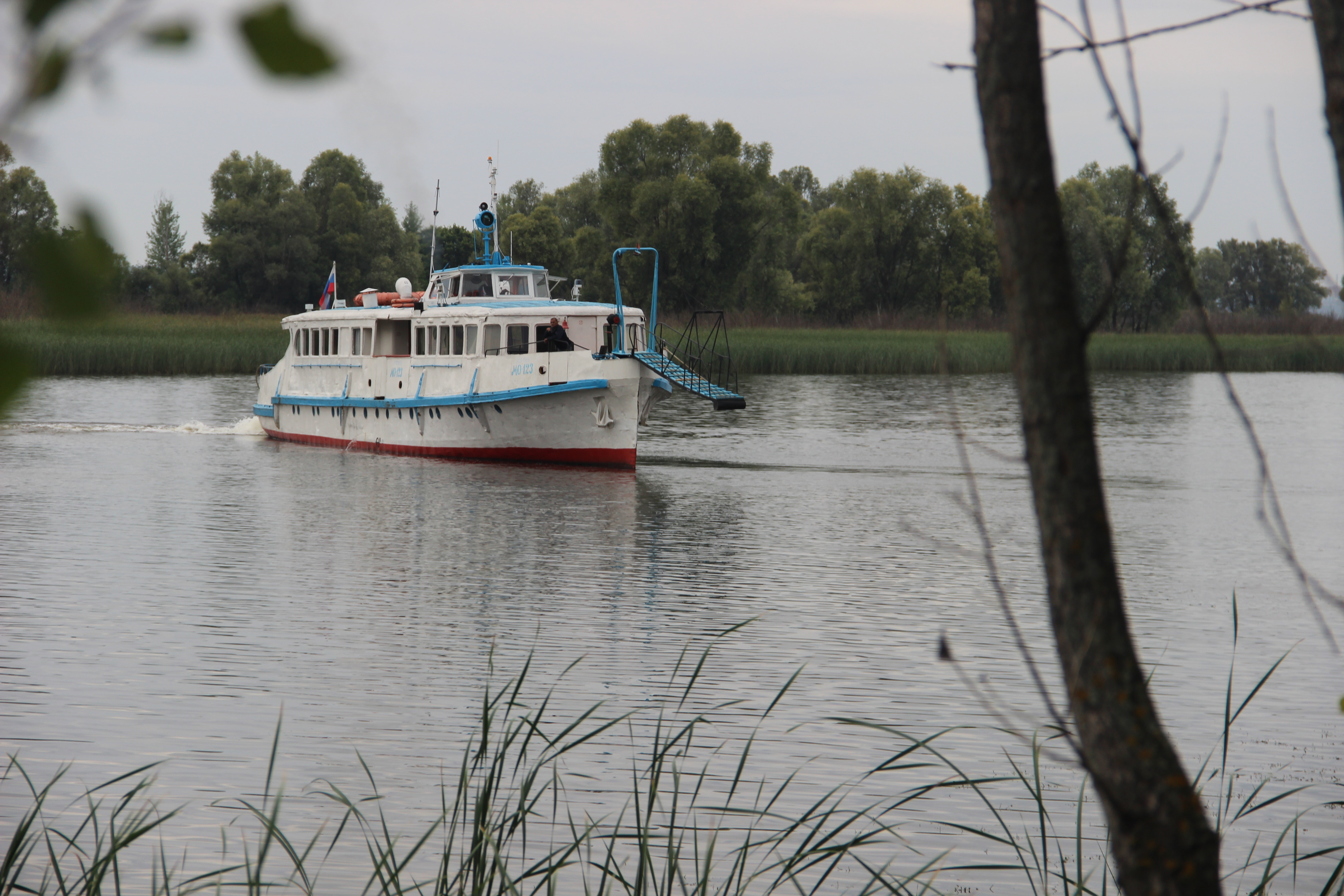
Passenger shipping on Kama

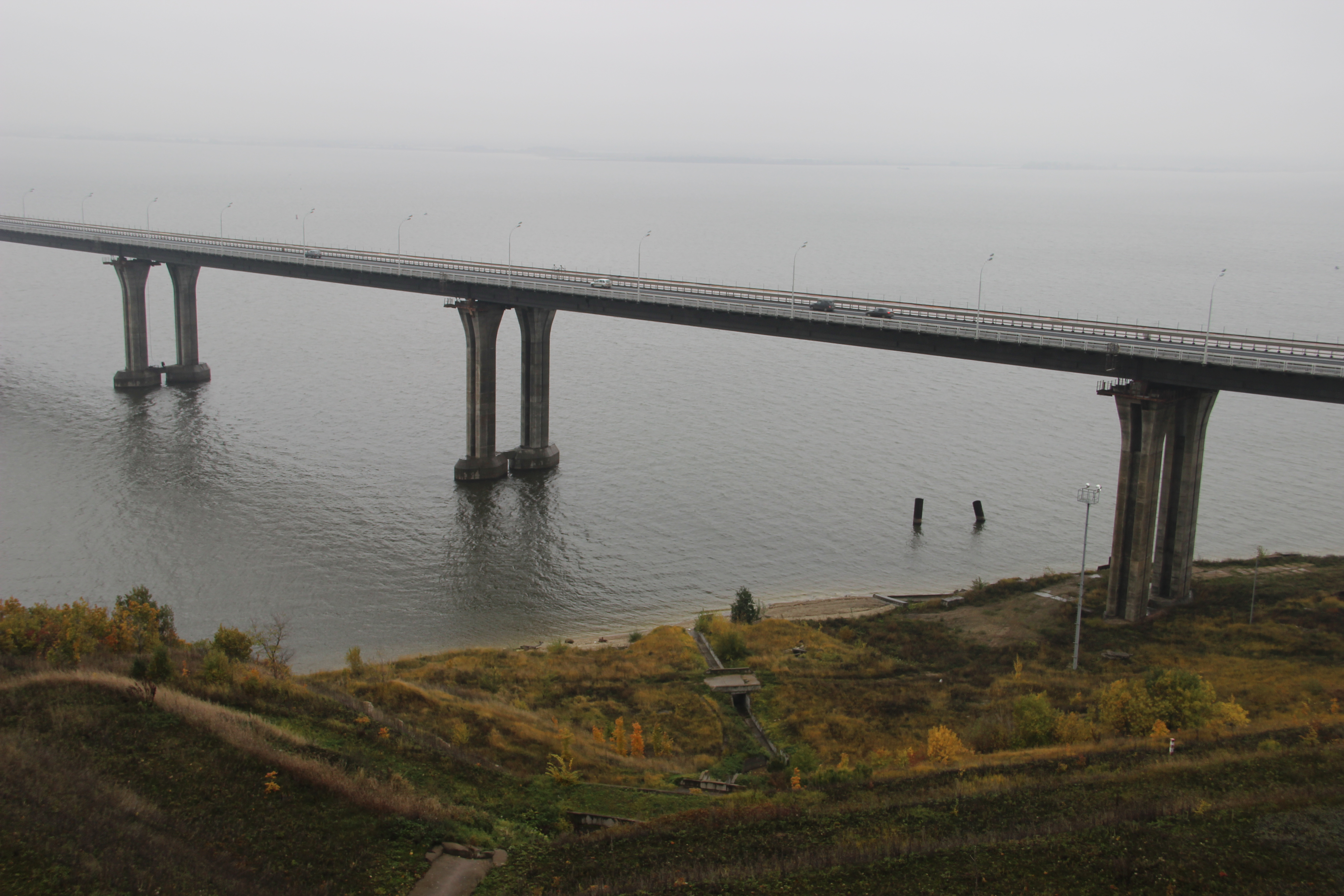
Bridge over the Kama in the Sorochy Mountains

The M-7 (Volga) “Moscow - Kazan - Ufa” highway passes through the north of the district. In the south-west of the district the P-239 "Kazan - Orenburg - border with Kazakhstan" leads to the bridge over the Kama along with the 16K-1091 "Shali - Sorochi Gory" "(Backup R-239 in the section from M-7 to Kama). The road Polyanka (R-239) - Rybnaya Sloboda - Bolshoi Mashlyak (M-7) runs through the district from the south-west to the north-east of the district.

In 2017, two sections of the federal highway M-7 Kazan-Moscow were opened in the district. At the same time, more than 92% of the local population does not have access to bus or railway connections with the administrative center and there are no railway stations. Just over half of the roads in the district meet regulatory requirements.

== Ecology ==
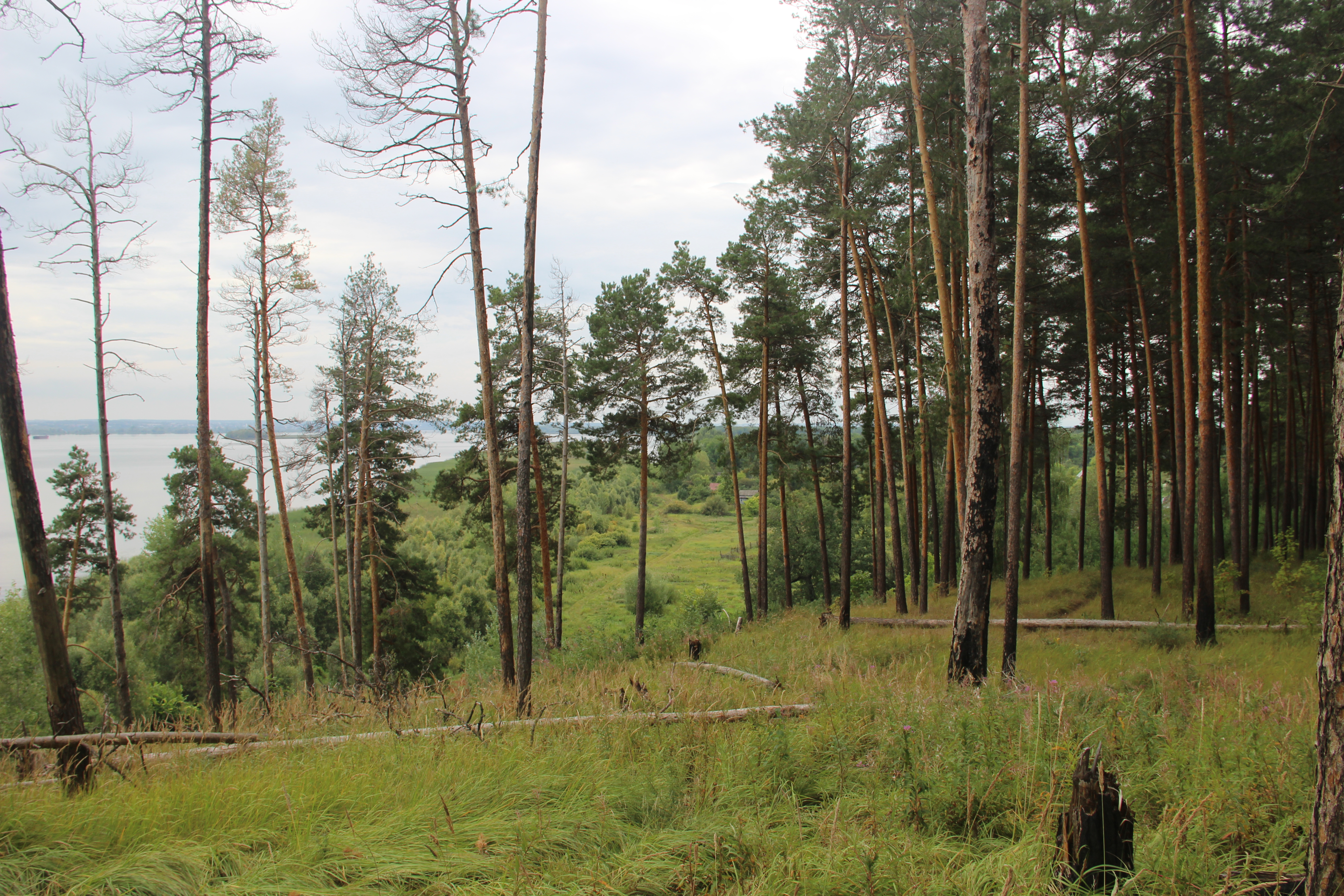
The outskirts of Krasniy Yar

Parts of the district are located on the banks of the Kama River, which flows into the Kuybyshev Reservoir. The rivers Betka, Oshnyak, Shumbut flow through the region. 13% of the district's territory is covered by Temperate deciduous forest which is primarily composed of Centaurea, iris sibirica, potamogeton, ranunculus lingua, epipactis atrorubens, potentilla erecta.

To the west-east of the Shumbut River there is a hunting reserve with an area of 12.5 thousand hectares. The reserve contains game such as elk, wild boar, beaver, fox, raccoon dogs, badgers and other animals.

== Culture and Society ==
The Rybno-Slobodskoy region is known in Russia for the fact that the poet Yakov Emelyanov grew up in the village of Alan-Polyan. In 2003 a treasure hoard of 6,000 coins dating from the 15th century was found in the district. Since 2019 a 19th-century mosque in the village of Bolshaya Yelga has been undergoing restoration under the leadership of the architect Alexander Popov.

In 2016, an ecopark of wild spotted and red deer - marals was opened, restoring natural living conditions for these endangered species. In 2020, Rybno-Slobodsky District became part of the tourist route "1001 Pleasure", which also includes Kamskoye Ustye, Kukmor, Bogatye Saby, Bolgar, Yelabuga, Mamadysh, Chistopol, Almetyevsk and Arsk.

In addition to tourism, sports projects are being actively developed in the region such as the Ice Palace with an area of 3.1 thousand square meters currently under construction. About 273 million rubles have been invested in the skating rink with the opening currently scheduled for 2021.

== Famous people ==
- Gizatulin, Minulla Sungatovich (1925-1993) - Hero of the Soviet Union
- Sergeev, Alexander Timofeevich (1916-1979) - Hero of the Soviet Union
- Shaimardanov, Zakiy Shaimardanovich (1923-1967) - Hero of the Soviet Union
- Rustam Minnikhanov - second President of the Republic of Tatarstan
- Nurullin, Rinnat Galeevich (Rinat Nurullin) (1954) - poet, Honored Inventor of the Republic of Tatarstan, candidate of technical sciences
- Faizullin, Ravil Gabdrakhmanovich (1943) - poet and professional writer, People's Poet of Tatarstan, Honored Art Worker of the RSFSR, laureate of the State Prize named after G. Tukai, Prize named after M. Jalil
- Fatkhutdinov, Damir Khasanovich (1923-1991) - geologist, laureate of the USSR State Prize
