= Rybnoye, Kamensky District, Altai Krai =

Rybnoye Рыбное
- Selo
- Location within Altai Krai Location within Russia
- Coordinates: 53°34′N 81°24′E
- Country: Russia
- Region: Altai Krai
- District: Kamensky District
- Time zone: UTC+7:00

Rybnoye (Russian: Рыбное) is a rural locality (a selo) and the administrative center of Rybinsky Selsoviet, Kamensky District, Altai Krai, Russia. The population was 783 as of 2013. There are 13 streets.

== Geography ==
Rybnoye is located 32 km south of Kamen-na-Obi (the district's administrative centre) by road. Samarsky is the nearest rural locality.
