= Rybny, Voronezh Oblast =

Rybny Рыбный
- Khutor
- Location within Voronezh Oblast Location within Russia
- Coordinates: 50°27′N 39°10′E
- Country: Russia
- Region: Voronezh Oblast
- District: Olkhovatsky District
- Time zone: UTC+3:00

Rybny (Russian: Рыбный) is a rural locality (a khutor) in Karayashnikovskoye Rural Settlement, Olkhovatsky District, Voronezh Oblast, Russia. The population was 151 as of 2010. There are 2 streets.

== Geography ==
Rybny is located 26 km north of Olkhovatka (the district's administrative centre) by road. Yurasovka is the nearest rural locality.
