= Rybnoye, Voronezh Oblast =

Rybnoye Рыбное
- Selo
- Location within Voronezh Oblast Location within Russia
- Coordinates: 50°53′N 39°09′E
- Country: Russia
- Region: Voronezh Oblast
- District: Ostrogozhsky District
- Founded: 1765

Population
  - Total: 427
- Time zone: UTC+3:00
- Postal code: 397811

Rybnoye (Russian: Рыбное) is a rural locality (a selo) in Krinichenskoye Rural Settlement, Ostrogozhsky District, Voronezh Oblast, Russia. The population was 427 as of 2010. There are 11 streets.

== Geography ==
Rybnoye is located 8 km northeast of Ostrogozhsk (the district's administrative centre) by road. Sredne-Voskresenskoye is the nearest rural locality.

== History ==
Rybnoye was founded in 1765 by German settlers from Württemberg and was known as Riebensdorf (German: Riebensdorf am Don; Russian: Рибенсдорф).
