= Rybnaya Sloboda =

Rybnaya Sloboda Рыбная Слобода
- Urban-type settlement

Other transcription(s)
  - Tatar: Балык Бистәсе
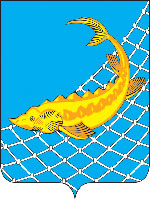
- Coat of arms
- Interactive map of Rybnaya Sloboda
- Location of Rybnaya Sloboda Rybnaya Sloboda (Tatarstan)
- Coordinates: 55°28′N 50°09′E
- Country: Russia
- Federal subject: Tatarstan
- Administrative district: Rybno-Slobodsky District
- Founded: 2nd half of the 16th century
- Urban-type settlement status since: 2004

Population (2010 Census)
  - Total: 7,684
  - Estimate (2021): 7,590 (−1.2%)

Administrative status
  - Capital of: Rybno-Slobodsky District

Municipal status
  - Municipal district: Rybno-Slobodsky Municipal District
  - Urban settlement: Rybnaya Sloboda Urban Settlement
  - Capital of: Rybno-Slobodsky Municipal District, Rybnaya Sloboda Urban Settlement
- Time zone: UTC+3 (MSK)
- Postal codes: 422650, 422679
- OKTMO ID: 92650151051

Rybnaya Sloboda (Russian: Ры́бная Слобода́, literally Fish Sloboda; Tatar: Балык Бистәсе) is an urban locality (an urban-type settlement) and the administrative center of Rybno-Slobodsky District in the Republic of Tatarstan, Russia, located on the right bank of the Kama River. As of the 2010 Census, its population was 7,684.

== History ==
It was established in the second half of the 16th century and was granted urban-type settlement status in 2004. In the 19th century, it was known for its jewelry and lace artisans. Rybnaya Sloboda has been serving as a district administrative center since 1927.

== Administrative and municipal status ==
Within the framework of administrative divisions, the urban-type settlement of Rybnaya Sloboda serves as the administrative center of Rybno-Slobodsky District, of which it is a part. As a municipal division, Rybnaya Sloboda is incorporated within Rybno-Slobodsky Municipal District as Rybnaya Sloboda Urban Settlement.

== Economy ==
As of 1997, local industrial facilities included several construction enterprises and a butter factory.

Rybnaya Sloboda serves as a port on the Kama River. The nearest railway station is Kazan, 91 kilometers (57 mi) to the northwest.

== Demographics ==
Rybnaya Sloboda population
- 2010 Census: 7,684
- 2002 Census: 7,177
- 1989 Census: 7,215
- 1979 Census: 5,908

As of 1989, the population was mostly Tatar (60%) and Russian (37%).

== Culture and education ==
Rybnaya Sloboda is home to a museum of military glory. There are two secondary schools and a vocational school.
