= Rybnoye, Ryazan Oblast =

Town in Ryazan Oblast, Russia

Rybnoye Рыбное
- Town
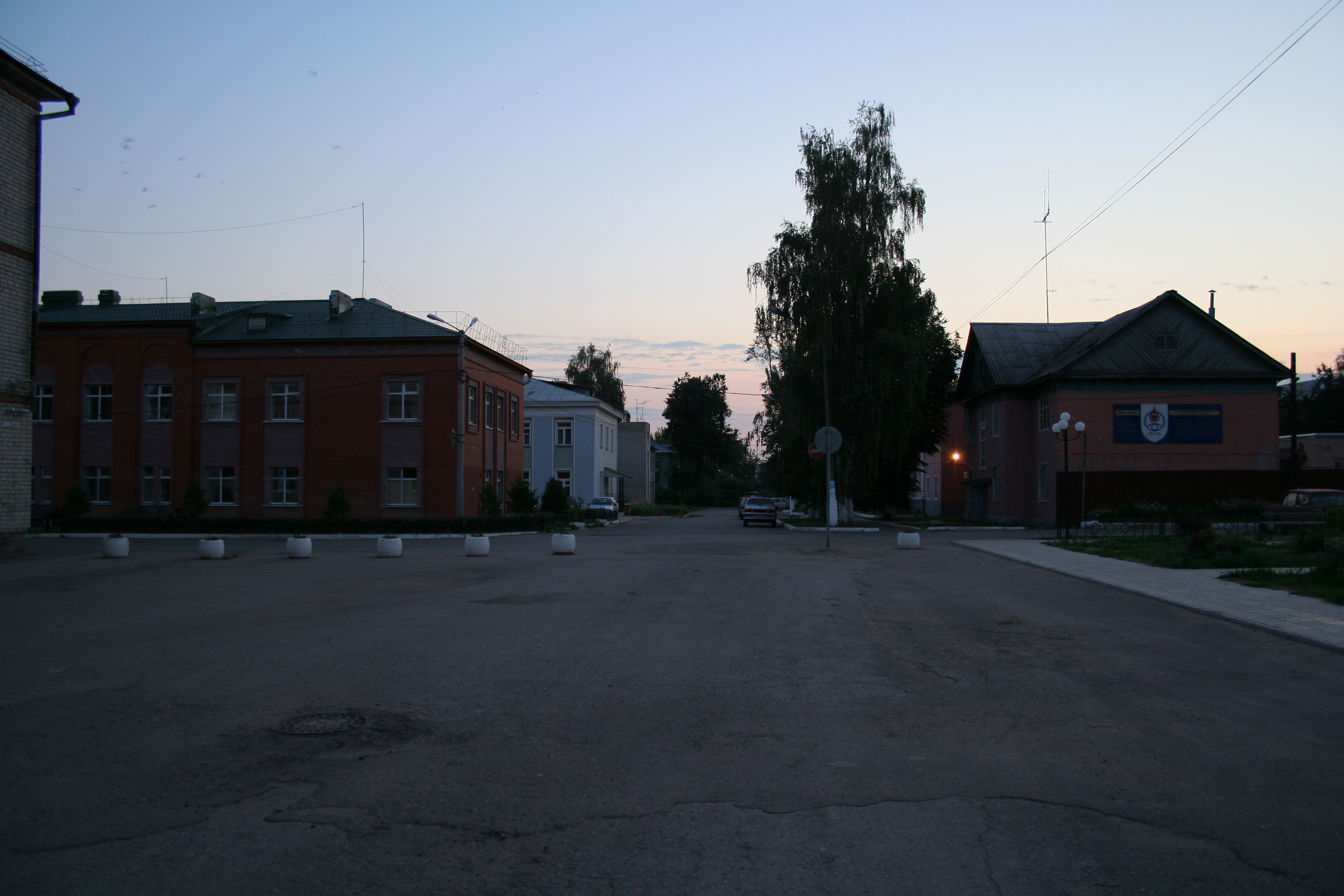
- Lenina Square in Rybnoye

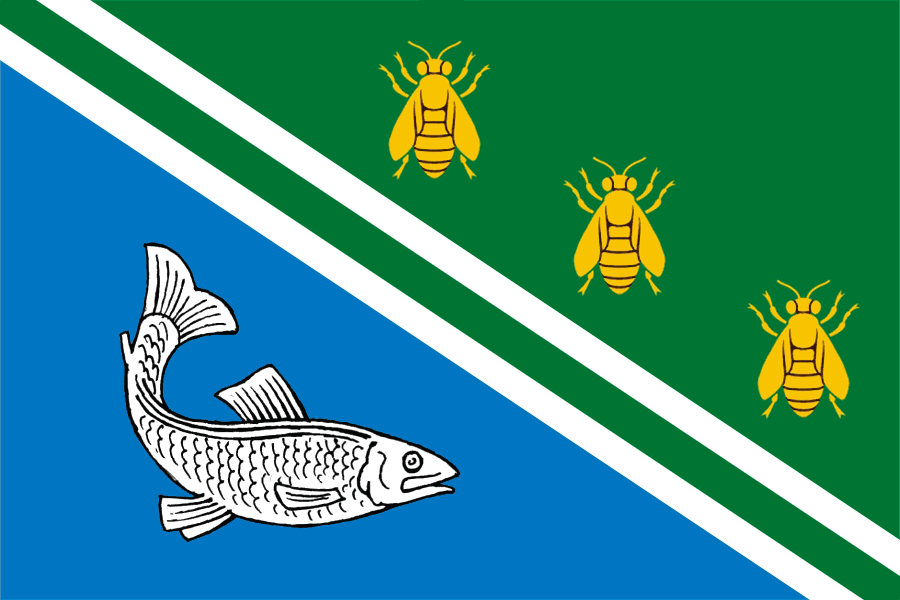
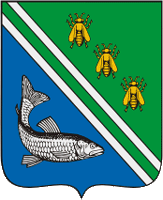
- Flag Coat of arms
- Interactive map of Rybnoye
- Location of Rybnoye Rybnoye (Ryazan Oblast)
- Coordinates: 54°44′N 39°31′E
- Country: Russia
- Federal subject: Ryazan Oblast
- Administrative district: Rybnovsky District
- Town of district significanceSelsoviet: Rybnoye
- First mentioned: 1597
- Town status since: 1961
- Elevation: 105 m (344 ft)

Population (2010 Census)
  - Total: 18,380
  - Estimate (2023): 21,200 (+15.3%)

Administrative status
  - Capital of: Rybnovsky District, town of district significance of Rybnoye

Municipal status
  - Municipal district: Rybnovsky Municipal District
  - Urban settlement: Rybnovskoye Urban Settlement
  - Capital of: Rybnovsky Municipal District, Rybnovskoye Urban Settlement
- Time zone: UTC+3 (MSK)
- Postal code: 391110–391112
- OKTMO ID: 61627101001

Rybnoye (Russian: Ры́бное) is a town and the administrative center of Rybnovsky District in Ryazan Oblast, Russia, located on the Vozha River (Oka's tributary) 18 kilometers (11 mi) northwest of Ryazan, the administrative center of the oblast. Population: 18,380 (2010 census); 19,150 (2002 census); 18,672 (1989 Soviet census).

== History ==
It was first mentioned in 1597 as a settlement of Rybnino (Ры́бнино) and was granted town status in 1961.

== Administrative and municipal status ==
Within the framework of administrative divisions, Rybnoye serves as the administrative center of Rybnovsky District. As an administrative division, it is incorporated within Rybnovsky District as the town of district significance of Rybnoye. As a municipal division, the town of district significance of Rybnoye is incorporated within Rybnovsky Municipal District as Rybnovskoye Urban Settlement.
