= Rybnovsky District =

Rybnovsky District Рыбновский район (Russian)
- District
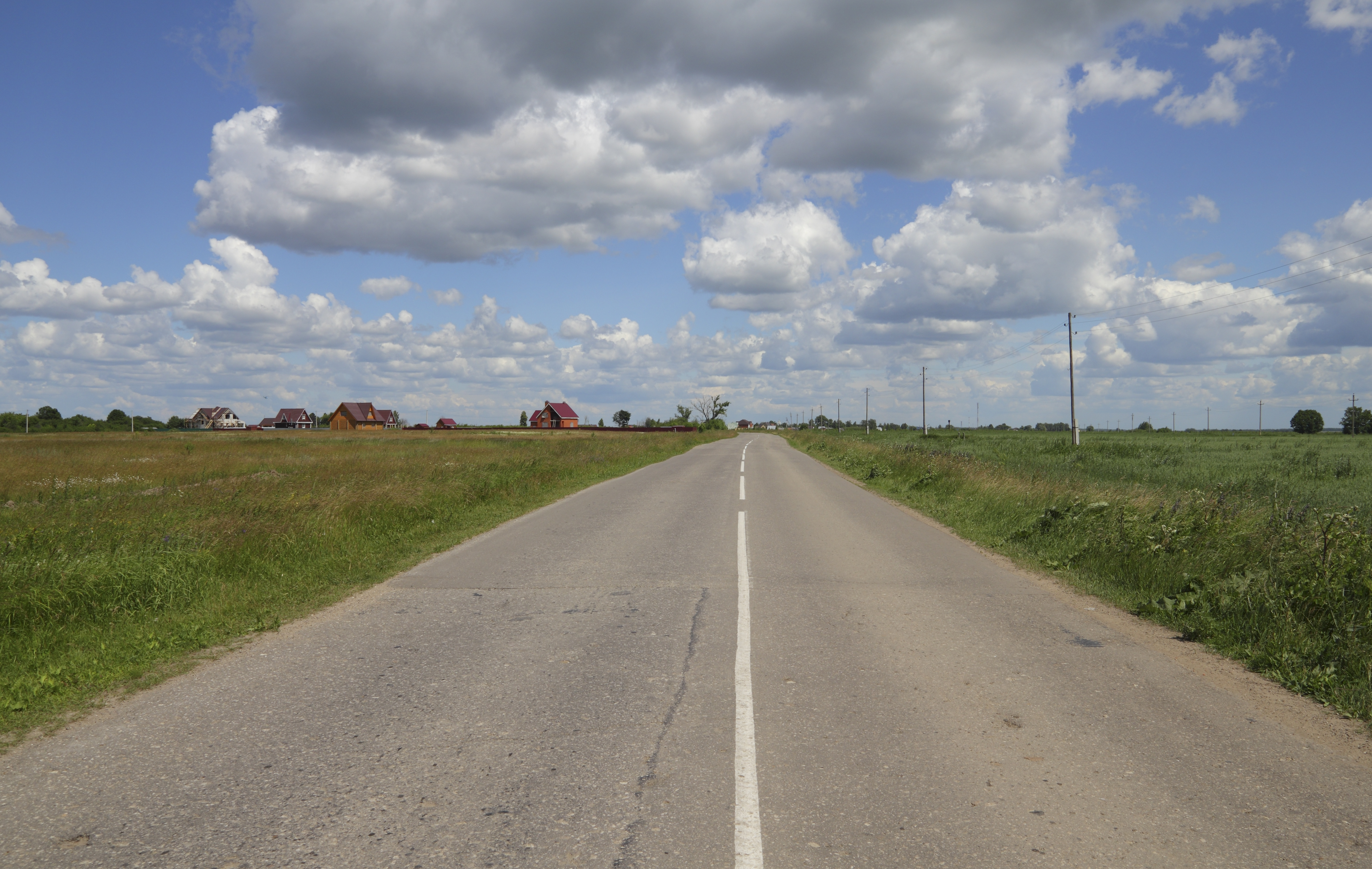
- Road between the selos of Fedyakino and Konstantinovo in Rybnovsky District

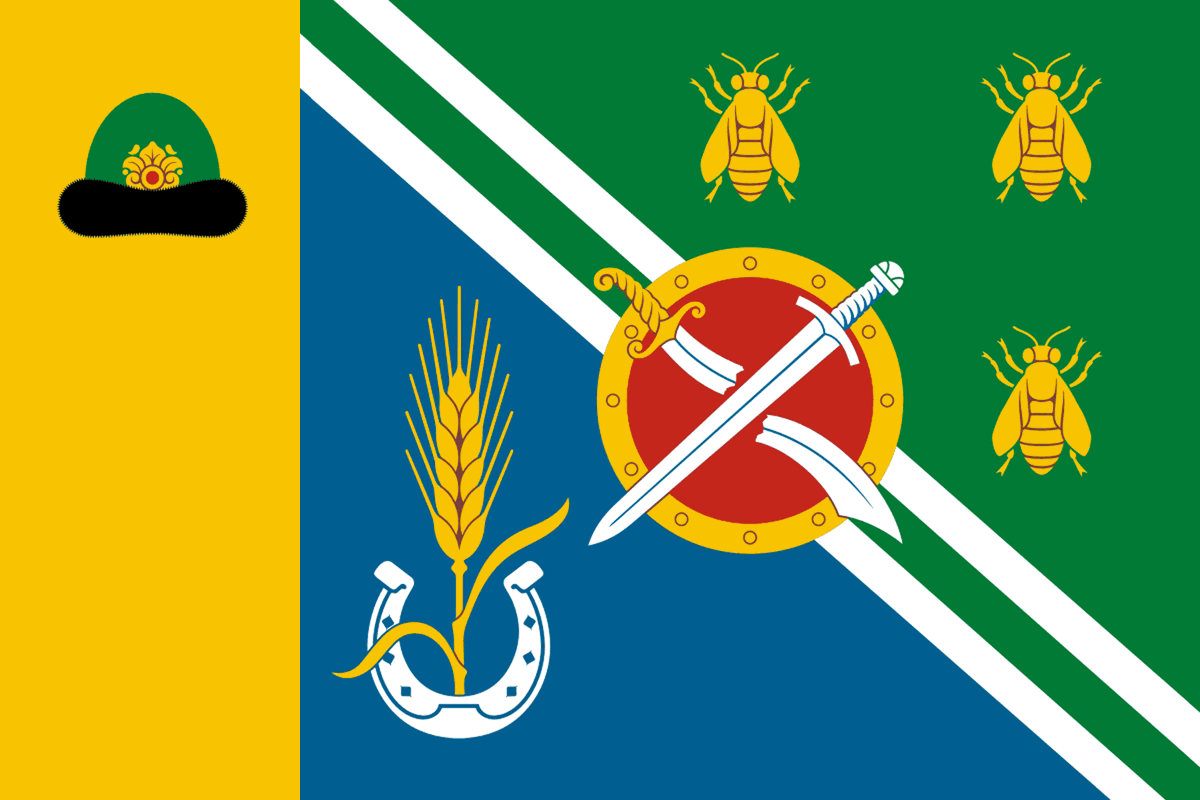
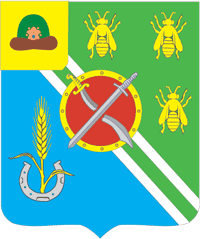
- Flag Coat of arms
- Location of Rybnovsky District in Ryazan Oblast
- Coordinates: 54°44′N 39°31′E
- Country: Russia
- Federal subject: Ryazan Oblast
- Established: 12 July 1929
- Administrative center: Rybnoye

Area
  - Total: 1,407 km^{2} (543 sq mi)

Population (2010 Census)
  - Total: 35,585
  - Density: 25.29/km^{2} (65.50/sq mi)
  - Urban: 51.7%
  - Rural: 48.3%

Administrative structure
  - Administrative divisions: 1 Towns of district significance, 12 Rural okrugs
  - Inhabited localities: 1 cities/towns, 113 rural localities

Municipal structure
  - Municipally incorporated as: Rybnovsky Municipal District
  - Municipal divisions: 1 urban settlements, 12 rural settlements
- Time zone: UTC+3 (MSK)
- OKTMO ID: 61627000
- Website: http://www.ribnoe.ru

Rybnovsky District (Russian: Рыбновский район, IPA: [ˈrɨbnəfskʲɪj rɐˈjɵn]) is an administrative and municipal district (raion), one of the twenty-five in Ryazan Oblast, Russia. It is located in the northwest of the oblast. The area of the district is 1,407 square kilometers (543 sq mi). Its administrative center is the town of Rybnoye. Population: 35,585 (2010 Census); 37,140 (2002 census); 38,744 (1989 Soviet census). The population of Rybnoye accounts for 51.7% of the district's total population.
