= Serafimovich (town) =

Town in Volgograd Oblast, Russia

Serafimovich Серафимович
- Town
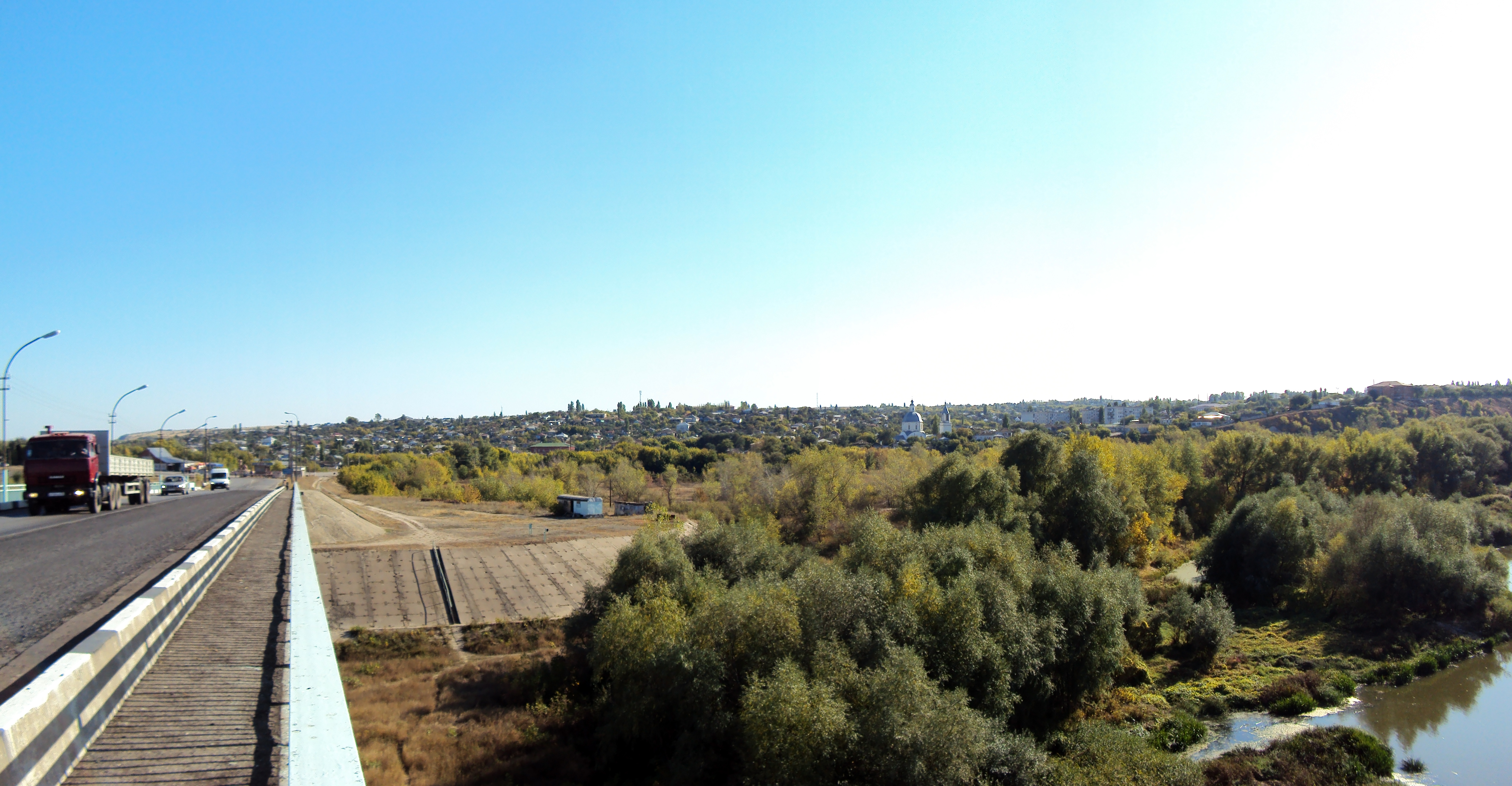
- View of Serafimovich from the bridge across the Don River

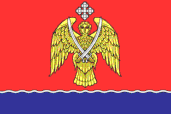
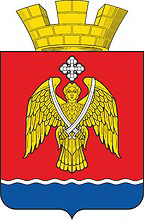
- Flag Coat of arms
- Interactive map of Serafimovich
- Location of Serafimovich Serafimovich (Volgograd Oblast)
- Coordinates: 49°35′N 42°44′E
- Country: Russia
- Federal subject: Volgograd Oblast
- Administrative district: Serafimovichsky District
- Town of district significanceSelsoviet: Serafimovich
- Founded: 1589
- Town status since: 1933
- Elevation: 110 m (360 ft)

Population (2010 Census)
  - Total: 9,368
  - Estimate (2021): 8,633 (−7.8%)

Administrative status
  - Capital of: Serafimovichsky District, town of district significance of Serafimovich

Municipal status
  - Municipal district: Serafimovichsky Municipal District
  - Urban settlement: Serafimovich Urban Settlement
  - Capital of: Serafimovichsky Municipal District, Serafimovich Urban Settlement
- Time zone: UTC+3 (MSK)
- Postal code: 403441
- OKTMO ID: 18650101001

Serafimovich (Russian: Серафимо́вич) is a town and the administrative center of Serafimovichsky District in Volgograd Oblast, Russia, located on the right bank of the River Don, 160 kilometers (99 mi) northwest of Volgograd, the administrative center of the oblast. Population: 9,368 (2010 census); 9,939 (2002 census); 10,040 (1989 Soviet census).

== History ==
It was founded in 1589 as the stanitsa of Ust-Medveditskaya (Усть-Медведицкая). In 1933, it was granted town status and renamed Serafimovich after the writer Alexander Serafimovich, who was born and lived here.

== Administrative and municipal status ==
Within the framework of administrative divisions, Serafimovich serves as the administrative center of Serafimovichsky District. As an administrative division, it is incorporated within Serafimovichsky District as the town of district significance of Serafimovich. As a municipal division, the town of district significance of Serafimovich is incorporated within Serafimovichsky Municipal District as Serafimovich Urban Settlement.
