= Serafimovichsky District =

Serafimovichsky District Серафимовичский район (Russian)
- District
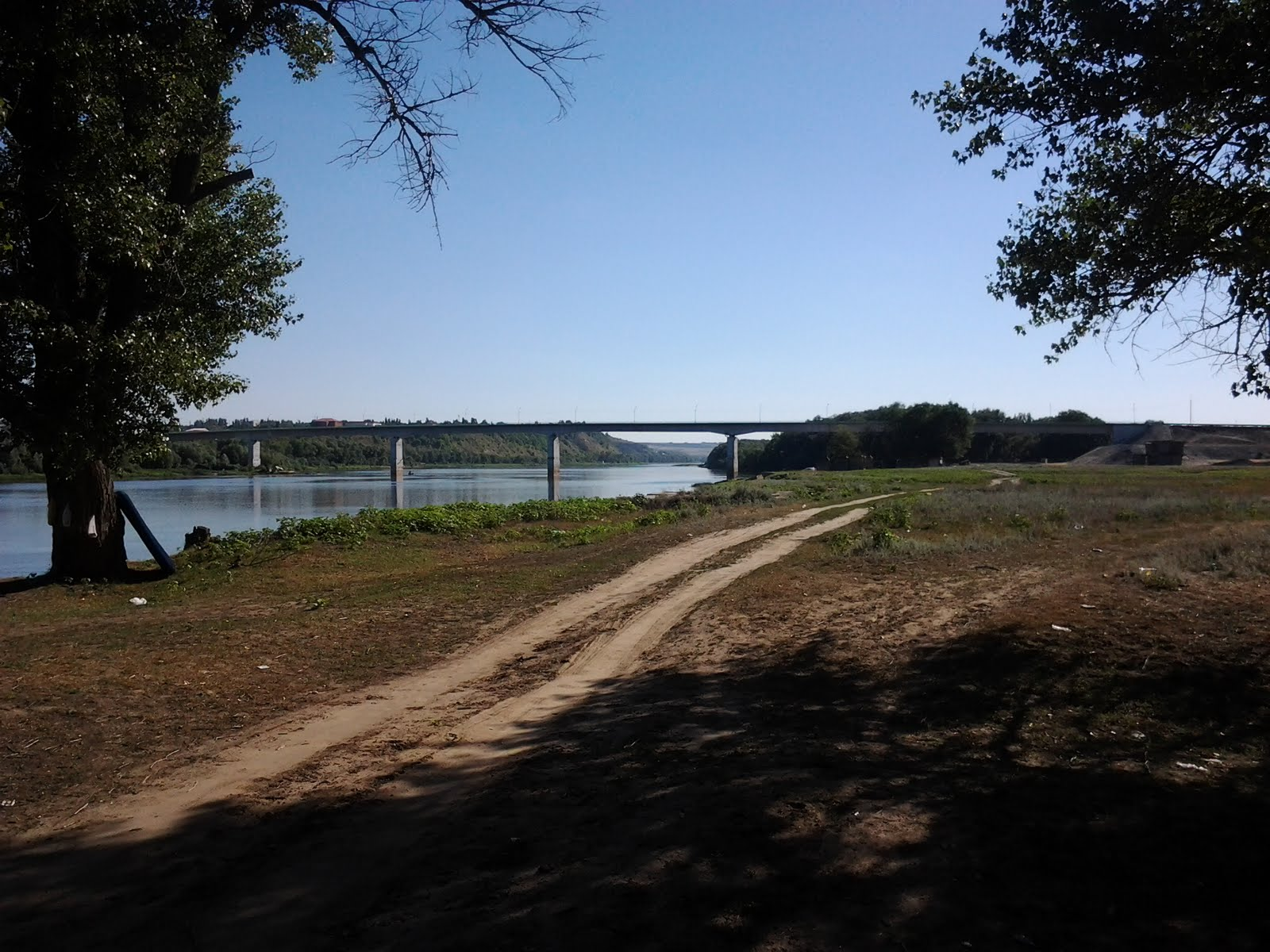
- River view, Serafimovichsky District

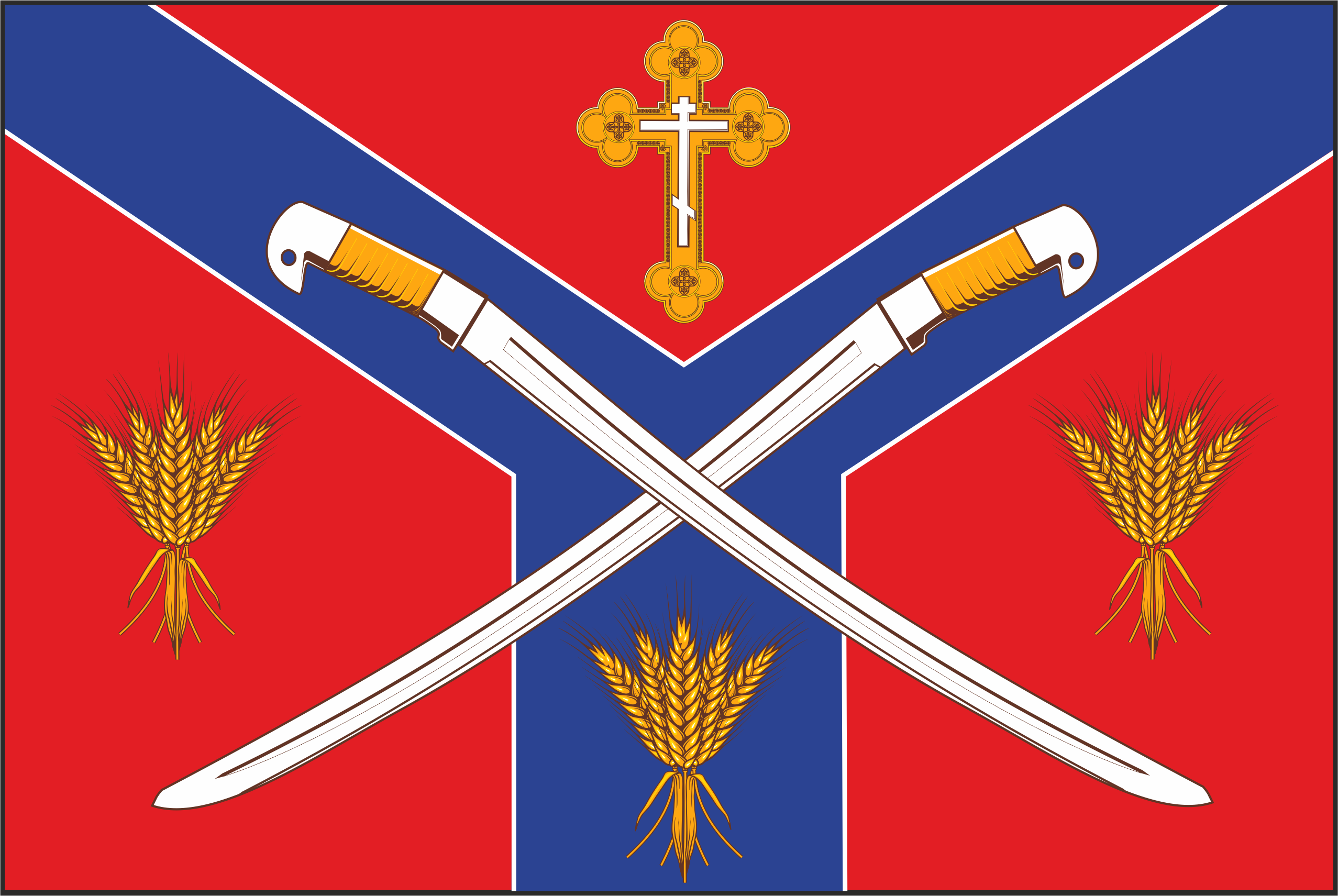
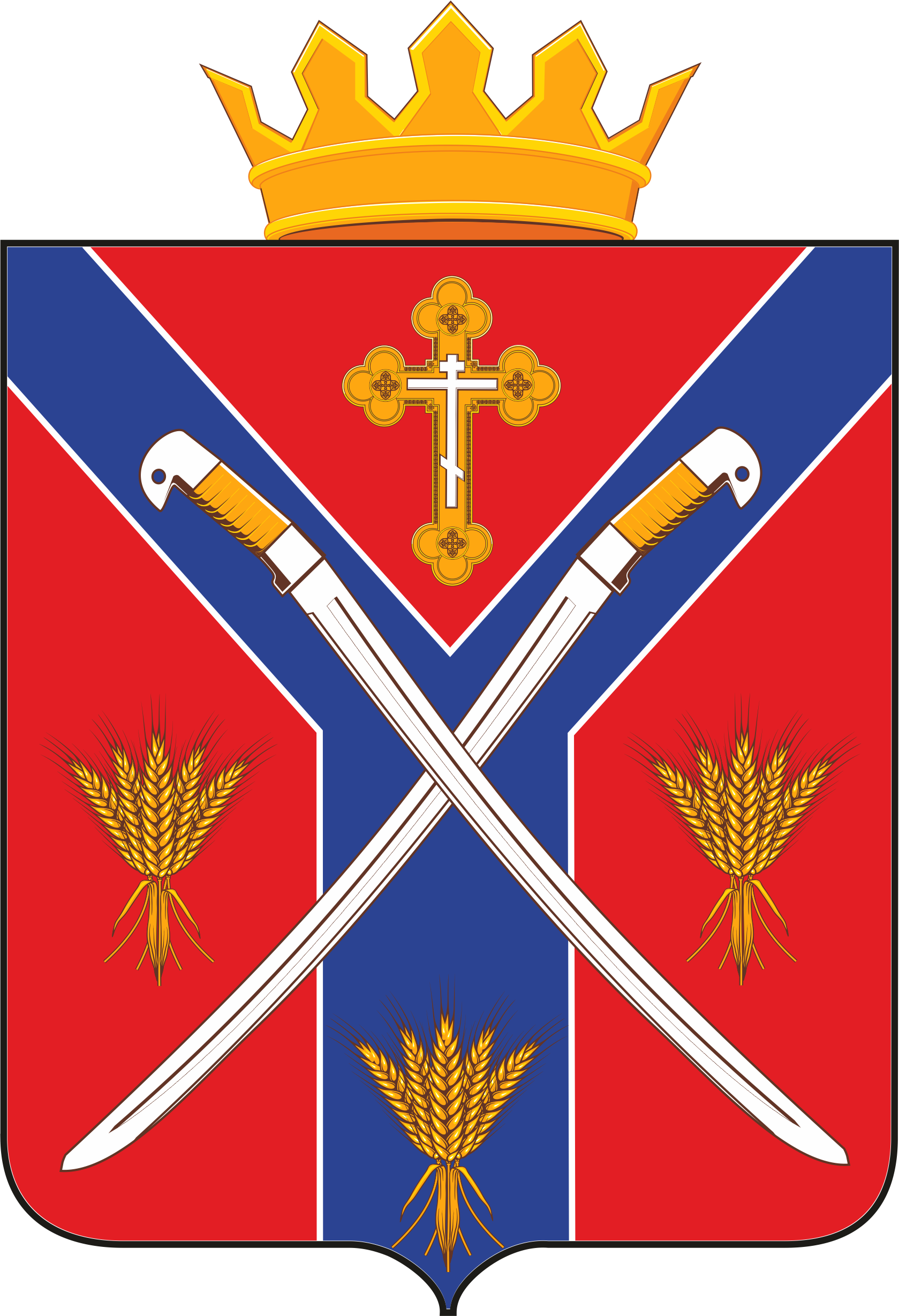
- Flag Coat of arms
- Location of Serafimovichsky District in Volgograd Oblast
- Coordinates: 49°35′N 42°44′E
- Country: Russia
- Federal subject: Volgograd Oblast
- Established: 1928
- Administrative center: Serafimovich

Area
  - Total: 4,360 km^{2} (1,680 sq mi)

Population (2010 Census)
  - Total: 25,378
  - Density: 5.82/km^{2} (15.1/sq mi)
  - Urban: 36.9%
  - Rural: 63.1%

Administrative structure
  - Administrative divisions: 1 Towns of district significance, 15 Selsoviets
  - Inhabited localities: 1 cities/towns, 72 rural localities

Municipal structure
  - Municipally incorporated as: Serafimovichsky Municipal District
  - Municipal divisions: 1 urban settlements, 14 rural settlements
- Time zone: UTC+3 (MSK)
- OKTMO ID: 18650000
- Website: http://serad.ru/

Serafimovichsky District (Russian: Серафимо́вичский райо́н) is an administrative district (raion), one of the thirty-three in Volgograd Oblast, Russia. As a municipal division, it is incorporated as Serafimovichsky Municipal District. It is located in the west of the oblast. The area of the district is 4,360 square kilometers (1,680 sq mi). Its administrative center is the town of Serafimovich. Population: 25,378 (2010 census); 27,137 (2002 Census); 27,684 (1989 Soviet census). The population of Serafimovich accounts for 36.9% of the district's total population.
