= History of Lithuania =

The history of Lithuania dates back to settlements founded about 10,000 years ago, but the first written record of the name for the country dates back to 1009 AD. Lithuanians, one of the Baltic peoples, later conquered neighbouring lands and established the Grand Duchy of Lithuania in the 13th century (and also a short-lived Kingdom of Lithuania). The Grand Duchy was a successful and lasting warrior state. It remained fiercely independent and was one of the last areas of Europe to adopt Christianity (beginning in the 14th century). A formidable power, it became the largest state in Europe in the 15th century spread from the Baltic Sea to the Black Sea, through the conquest of large groups of East Slavs who resided in Ruthenia.

In 1385, the Grand Duchy formed a dynastic union with Poland through the Union of Krewo. Later, the Union of Lublin (1569) created the Polish–Lithuanian Commonwealth. During the Second Northern War, the Grand Duchy sought protection under the Swedish Empire through the Union of Kėdainiai in 1655. However, it soon returned to being a part of the Polish–Lithuanian state, which persisted until 1795 when the last of the Partitions of Poland erased both independent Lithuania and Poland from the political map. After the dissolution, Lithuanians lived under the rule of the Russian Empire until the 20th century, although there were several major rebellions, especially in 1831 and 1863.

On 16 February 1918, Lithuania was re-established as a democratic state. It remained independent until the onset of World War II, when it was occupied by the Soviet Union under the terms of the Molotov–Ribbentrop Pact. Following a brief occupation by Nazi Germany after the Nazis waged war on the Soviet Union, Lithuania was again absorbed into the Soviet Union for nearly 50 years. In 1990–1991, Lithuania restored its sovereignty with the Act of the Re-Establishment of the State of Lithuania. Lithuania joined the NATO alliance in 2004 and the European Union as part of its enlargement in 2004.

== Before statehood ==
=== Early settlement ===
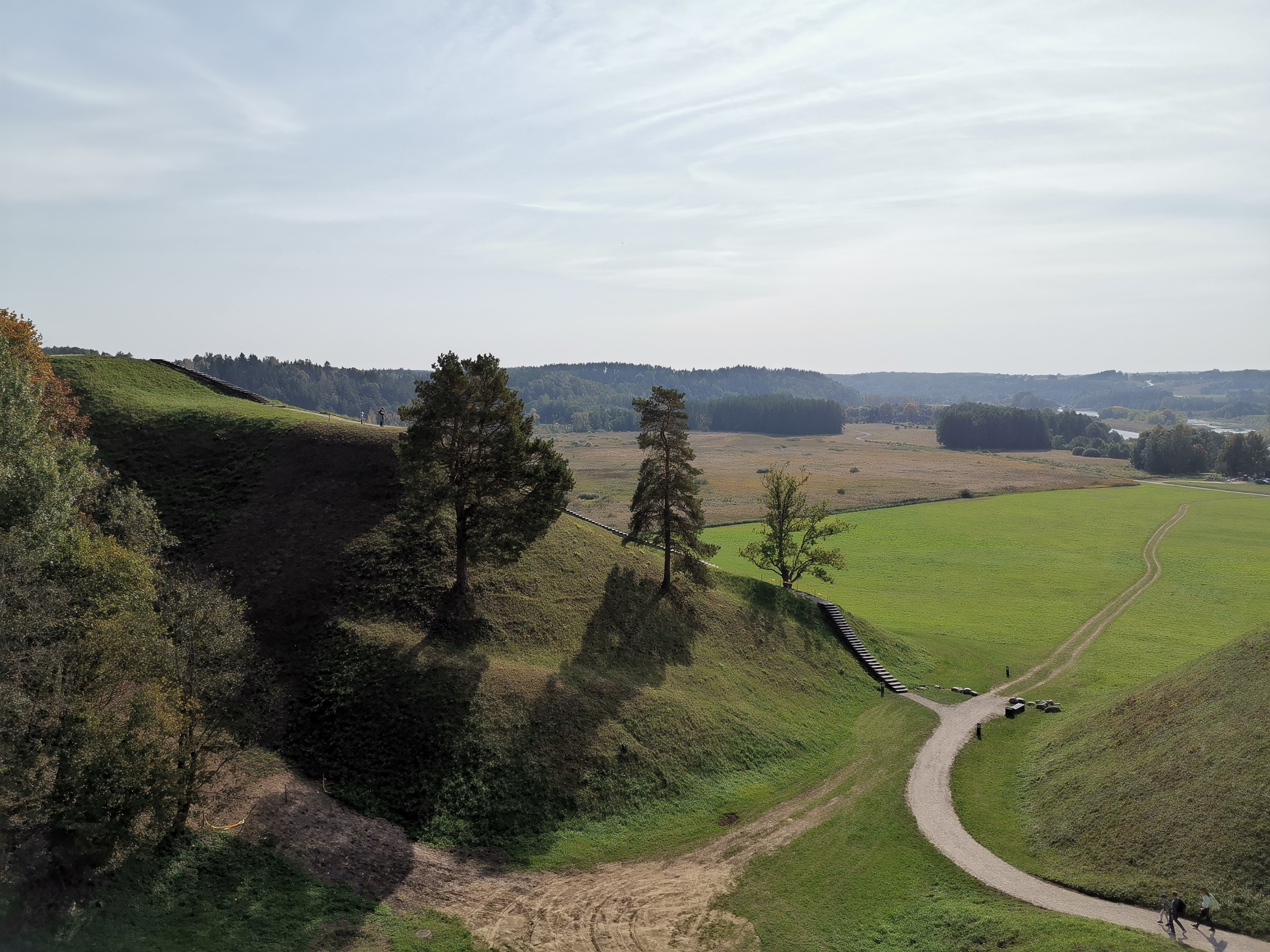
Kernavė Mounds

The first humans arrived on the territory of modern Lithuania in the second half of the 10th millennium BC after the glaciers receded at the end of the last glacial period. They were traveling hunters and did not form stable settlements. According to the historian Marija Gimbutas, these people came from two directions: the Jutland Peninsula and from present-day Poland. They brought two different cultures, as evidenced by the tools they used. The following centuries are characterised by the "Baltic Magdalenian" and the Swiderian culture. In the 8th millennium BC, the climate became much warmer, and forests developed. The inhabitants of what is now Lithuania then traveled less and engaged in local hunting, gathering and fresh-water fishing. This transition is often connected with the cultural transition from Paleolithic to Mesolithic. During the 5th millennium BC, the Neolithic started and different forms of crafts and artistic production started to develop. Hunting, however, stayed the main form of food procurement; agriculture developed only slowly and did not emerge until the 3rd millennium BC. During the Neolithic, first forms of interregional trade began, especially with amber. The dwellings became more sophisticated in order to shelter larger families.

Speakers of North-Western Indo-European might have arrived with the Corded Ware culture around 3200/3100 BC.

=== Baltic tribes ===
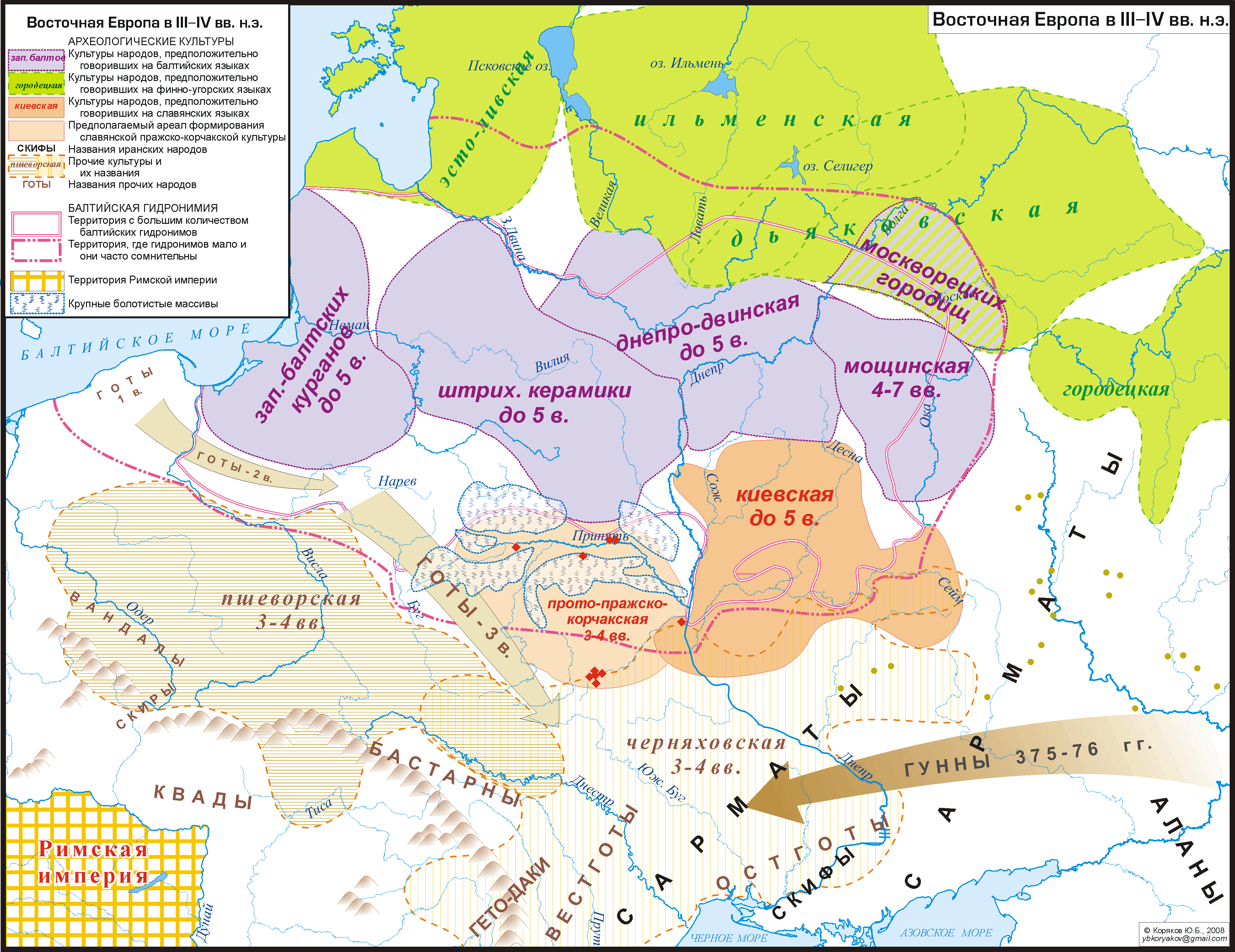
Map of the ancient Baltic homelands at the time of the Hunnish invasions (c. 3rd – c. 4th AD). Baltic cultural areas (identified archaeologically) are in purple. The Baltic sphere originally covered Eastern Europe from the Baltic Sea to modern Moscow.

Baltic tribes around 1200, in the neighbourhood about to face the Teutonic Knights' conversion and conquests; note that Baltic territory extended far inland.

The first Lithuanian people were a branch of an ancient group known as the Balts. (Note: Historically, there has been a scholarly dispute concerning the origin of the Balts. According to one major point of view, the Baltic peoples descend directly from the original Indo-European arrivals, who might have settled this part of Europe possibly as far back as about 3000 BC as the archeological Corded Ware culture. The linguistic argument has been the most "archaic" status of the Lithuanian language among the existing Indo-European languages of Europe. The competing idea takes into account the many words common to both the Baltic and Slavic languages and postulates a shared, more recent Balto-Slavic ancestry. There has been no agreement regarding which archeological formation such hypothetical Proto-Balto-Slavic community would correspond to.) The main tribal divisions of the Balts were the West Baltic Old Prussians and Yotvingians, and the East Baltic Lithuanians and Latvians. The Balts spoke forms of the Indo-European languages. Today, the only remaining Baltic nationalities are the Lithuanians and Latvians, but there were more Baltic groups or tribes in the past. Some of these merged into Lithuanians and Latvians (Samogitians, Selonians, Curonians, Semigallians), while others no longer existed after they were conquered and assimilated by the State of the Teutonic Order (Old Prussians, Yotvingians, Sambians, Skalvians, and Galindians).

The Baltic tribes did not maintain close cultural or political contacts with the Roman Empire, but they did maintain trade contacts (see Amber Road). Tacitus, in his study Germania, described the Aesti people, inhabitants of the south-eastern Baltic Sea shores who were probably Balts, around the year 97 AD. The Western Balts differentiated and became known to outside chroniclers first. Ptolemy in the 2nd century AD knew of the Galindians and Yotvingians, and early medieval chroniclers mentioned Prussians, Curonians and Semigallians.

Lithuania, located along the lower and middle Neman River basin, comprised mainly the culturally different regions of Samogitia (known for its early medieval skeletal burials), and further east Aukštaitija, or Lithuania proper (known for its early medieval cremation burials). The area was remote and unattractive to outsiders, including traders, which accounts for its separate linguistic, cultural and religious identity and delayed integration into general European patterns and trends.

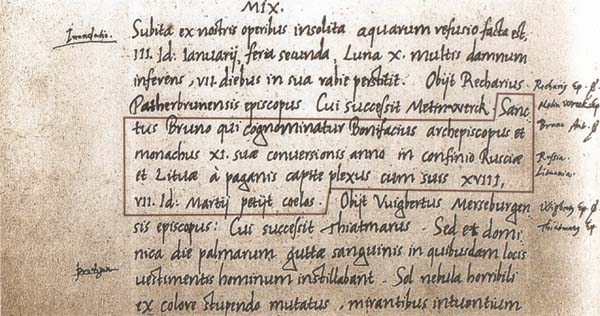
Lithuania's name first written in 1009, in the annals of the Quedlinburg Abbey, Germany.

The Lithuanian language is considered to be very conservative for its close connection to Indo-European roots. It is believed to have differentiated from the Latvian language, the most closely related existing language, around the 7th century. Traditional Lithuanian pagan customs and mythology, with many archaic elements, were long preserved. Rulers' bodies were cremated up until the Christianization of Lithuania: the descriptions of the cremation ceremonies of the grand dukes Algirdas and Kęstutis have survived.

The Lithuanian tribe is thought to have developed more recognizably toward the end of the first millennium. The first known reference to Lithuania as a nation ("Litua") comes from the Annals of the Quedlinburg monastery, dated 9 March 1009. In 1009, the missionary Bruno of Querfurt arrived in Lithuania and baptized the Lithuanian ruler "King Nethimer."

=== Formation of a Lithuanian state ===
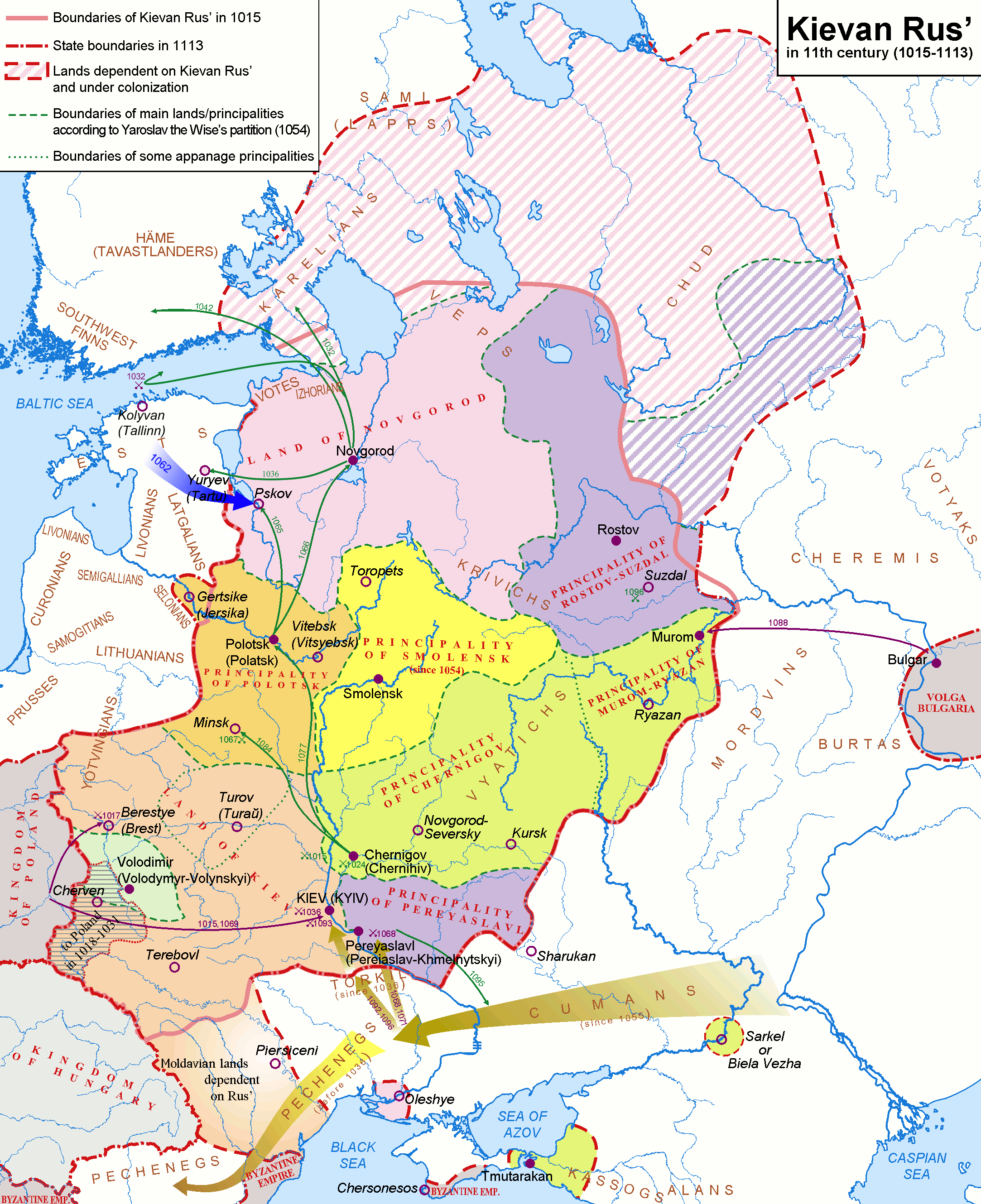
East of the Baltic tribes: Kievan Rus'

From the 9th to the 11th centuries, coastal Balts were subjected to raids by the Vikings, and the kings of Denmark collected tribute at times. During the 10–11th centuries, Lithuanian territories were among the lands paying tribute to Kievan Rus', and Yaroslav the Wise was among the Ruthenian rulers who invaded Lithuania (from 1040). From the mid-12th century, it was the Lithuanians who were invading Ruthenian territories. In 1183, Polotsk and Pskov were ravaged, and even the distant and powerful Novgorod Republic was repeatedly threatened by the excursions from the emerging Lithuanian war machine toward the end of the 12th century.

In the 12th century and afterwards, mutual raids involving Lithuanian and Polish forces took place sporadically, but the two countries were separated by the lands of the Yotvingians. The late 12th century brought an eastern expansion of German settlers (the Ostsiedlung) to the mouth of the Daugava River area. Military confrontations with Lithuanians followed at that time and at the turn of the century, but for the time being the Lithuanians had the upper hand.

From the late 12th century, an organized Lithuanian military force existed; it was used for external raids, plundering and the gathering of slaves. Such military and pecuniary activities fostered social differentiation and triggered a struggle for power in Lithuania. This initiated the formation of early statehood, from which the Grand Duchy of Lithuania developed. In 1231, the Danish Census Book mentions Baltic lands paying tribute to the Danes, including Lithuania (Littonia).

== Grand Duchy of Lithuania (13th century–1569) ==
=== 13th–14th century Lithuanian state ===
==== Mindaugas and his kingdom ====
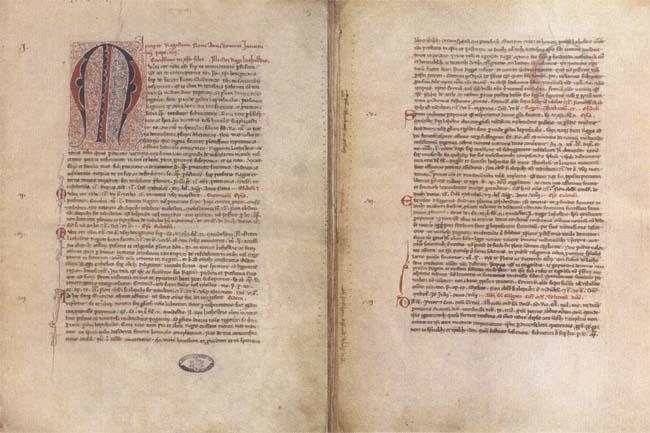
Pope Innocent IV's bull regarding Lithuania's placement under the jurisdiction of the Bishop of Rome, Mindaugas' baptism and coronation

From the early 13th century, frequent foreign military excursions became possible due to the increased cooperation and coordination among the Baltic tribes. Forty such expeditions took place between 1201 and 1236 against Ruthenia, Poland, Latvia and Estonia, which were then being conquered by the Livonian Order. Pskov was pillaged and burned in 1213. In 1219, twenty-one Lithuanian chiefs signed a peace treaty with the state of Galicia–Volhynia. This event is widely accepted as the first proof that the Baltic tribes were uniting and consolidating.

From the early 13th century, two German crusading military orders, the Livonian Brothers of the Sword and the Teutonic Knights, became established at the mouth of the Daugava River and in Chełmno Land respectively. Under the pretense of converting the population to Christianity, they proceeded to conquer much of the area that is now Latvia and Estonia, in addition to parts of Lithuania. In response, a number of small Baltic tribal groups united under the rule of Mindaugas. Mindaugas, originally a kunigas or major chief, one of the five senior dukes listed in the treaty of 1219, is referred to as the ruler of all Lithuania as of 1236 in the Livonian Rhymed Chronicle.

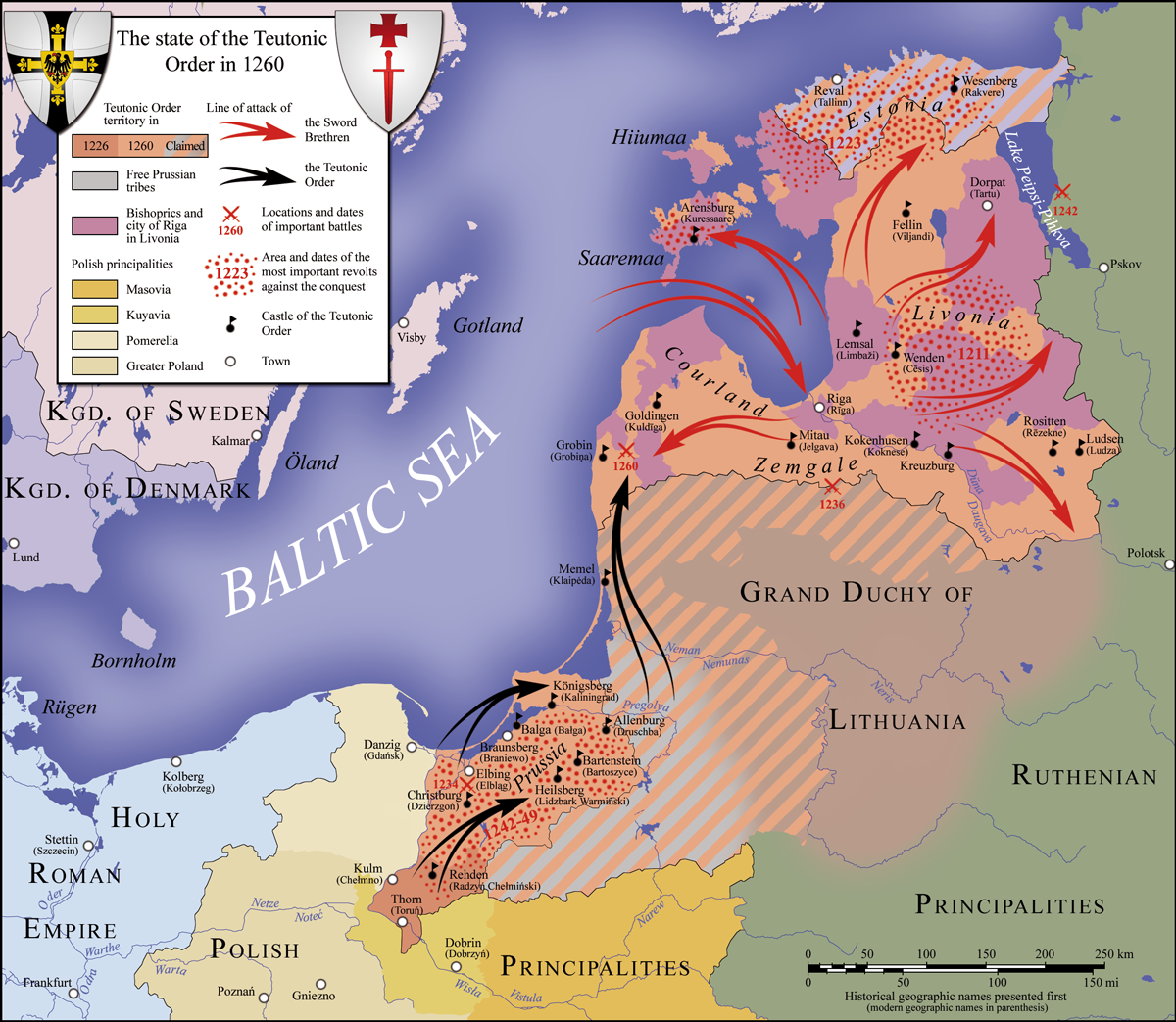
State of the Teutonic Order in 1260

In 1236 the pope declared a crusade against the Lithuanians. The Samogitians, led by Vykintas, Mindaugas' rival, soundly defeated the Livonian Brothers and their allies in the Battle of Saule in 1236, which forced the Brothers to merge with the Teutonic Knights in 1237. But Lithuania was trapped between the two branches of the Order.

Around 1240, Mindaugas ruled over all of Aukštaitija. Afterwards, he conquered the Black Ruthenia region (which consisted of Grodno, Brest, Navahrudak and the surrounding territories). Mindaugas was in process of extending his control to other areas, killing rivals or sending relatives and members of rival clans east to Ruthenia so they could conquer and settle there. They did that, but they also rebelled. The Ruthenian duke Daniel of Galicia sensed an occasion to recover Black Ruthenia and in 1249–1250 organized a powerful anti-Mindaugas (and "anti-pagan") coalition that included Mindaugas' rivals, Yotvingians, Samogitians and the Livonian Teutonic Knights. Mindaugas, however, took advantage of the divergent interests in the coalition he faced.

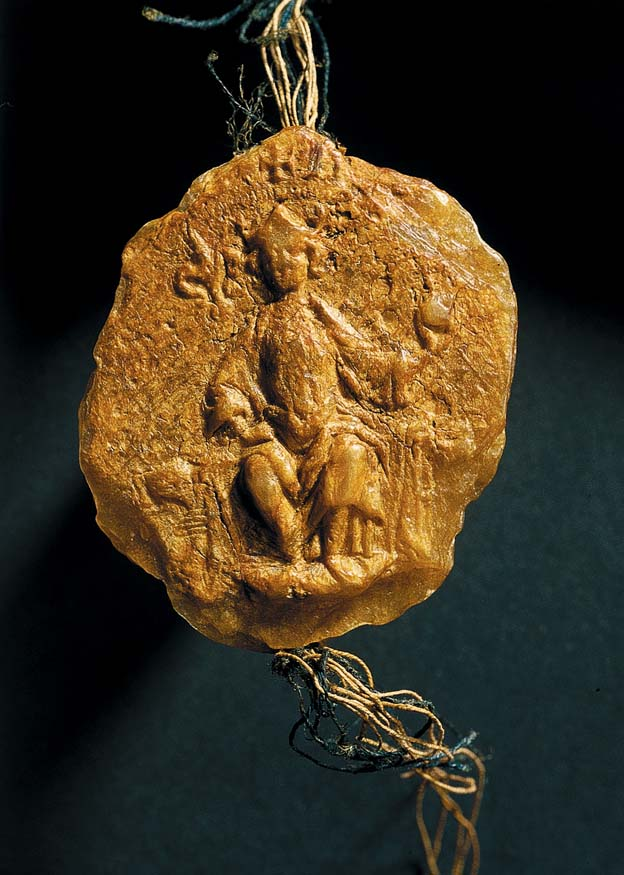
Seal of Mindaugas

In 1250, Mindaugas entered into an agreement with the Teutonic Order; he consented to receive baptism (the act took place in 1251) and relinquish his claim over some lands in western Lithuania, for which he was to receive a royal crown in return. Mindaugas was then able to withstand a military assault from the remaining coalition in 1251, and, supported by the Knights, emerge as a victor to confirm his rule over Lithuania.

On 17 July 1251, Pope Innocent IV signed two papal bulls that ordered the Bishop of Chełmno to crown Mindaugas as King of Lithuania, appoint a bishop for Lithuania, and build a cathedral. In 1253, Mindaugas was crowned and a Kingdom of Lithuania was established for the first and only time in Lithuanian history. Mindaugas "granted" parts of Yotvingia and Samogitia that he did not control to the Knights in 1253–1259. A peace with Daniel of Galicia in 1254 was cemented by a marriage deal involving Mindaugas' daughter and Daniel's son Shvarn. Mindaugas' nephew Tautvilas returned to his Duchy of Polotsk and Samogitia separated, soon to be ruled by another nephew, Treniota.

In 1260, the Samogitians, victorious over the Teutonic Knights in the Battle of Durbe, agreed to submit themselves to Mindaugas' rule on the condition that he abandons the Christian religion; the king complied by terminating the emergent conversion of his country, renewed anti-Teutonic warfare (in the struggle for Samogitia) and expanded further his Ruthenian holdings. It is not clear whether this was accompanied by his personal apostasy. Mindaugas thus established the basic tenets of medieval Lithuanian policy: defense against the German Order expansion from the west and north and conquest of Ruthenia in the south and east.

Mindaugas was the principal founder of the Lithuanian state. He established for a while a Christian kingdom under the pope rather than the Holy Roman Empire, at a time when the remaining pagan peoples of Europe were no longer being converted peacefully, but conquered.

==== Traidenis, Teutonic conquests of Baltic tribes ====
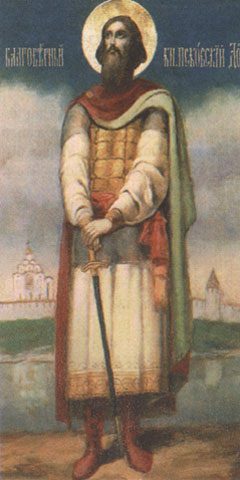
Daumantas of Pskov killed Mindaugas in revenge for the king's taking of Daumantas' wife

Mindaugas was murdered in 1263 by Daumantas of Pskov and Treniota, an event that resulted in great unrest and civil war. Treniota, who took over the rule of the Lithuanian territories, murdered Tautvilas, but was killed himself in 1264. The rule of Mindaugas' son Vaišvilkas followed. He was the first Lithuanian duke known to become an Orthodox Christian and settle in Ruthenia, establishing a pattern to be followed by many others. Vaišvilkas was killed in 1267. A power struggle between Shvarn and Traidenis resulted; it ended in a victory for the latter. Traidenis' reign (1269–1282) was the longest and most stable during the period of unrest. Tradenis reunified all Lithuanian lands, repeatedly raided Ruthenia and Poland with success, defeated the Teutonic Knights in Prussia and in Livonia at the Battle of Aizkraukle in 1279. He also became the ruler of Yotvingia, Semigalia and eastern Prussia. Friendly relations with Poland followed, and in 1279, Tradenis' daughter Gaudemunda of Lithuania married Bolesław II of Masovia, a Piast duke.

Pagan Lithuania was a target of northern Christian crusades of the Teutonic Knights and the Livonian Order. In 1241, 1259 and 1275, Lithuania was also ravaged by raids from the Golden Horde, which earlier (1237–1240) debilitated Kievan Rus'. After Traidenis' death, the German Knights finalized their conquests of Western Baltic tribes, and they could concentrate on Lithuania, especially on Samogitia, to connect the two branches of the Order. A particular opportunity opened in 1274 after the conclusion of the Great Prussian Rebellion and the conquest of the Old Prussian tribe. The Teutonic Knights then proceeded to conquer other Baltic tribes: the Nadruvians and Skalvians in 1274–1277 and the Yotvingians in 1283. The Livonian Order completed its conquest of Semigalia, the last Baltic ally of Lithuania, in 1291.

==== Vytenis, Lithuania's great expansion under Gediminas ====
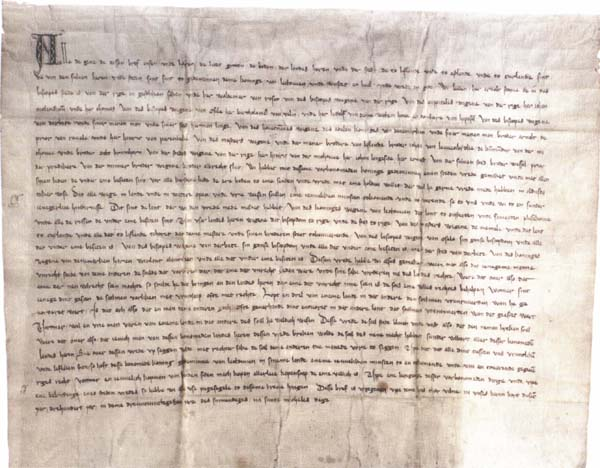
Peace agreement between Gediminas and the Teutonic Order

The family of Gediminas, whose members were about to form Lithuania's great native dynasty, took over the rule of the Grand Duchy in 1285 under Butigeidis. Vytenis (r. 1295–1315) and Gediminas (r. 1315–1341), after whom the Gediminid dynasty is named, had to deal with constant raids and incursions from the Teutonic orders that were costly to repulse. Vytenis fought them effectively around 1298 and at about the same time was able to ally Lithuania with the German burghers of Riga. For their part, the Prussian Knights instigated a rebellion in Samogitia against the Lithuanian ruler in 1299–1300, followed by twenty incursions there in 1300–15. Gediminas also fought the Teutonic Knights, and besides that made shrewd diplomatic moves by cooperating with the government of Riga in 1322–23 and taking advantage of the conflict between the Knights and Archbishop Friedrich von Pernstein of Riga.

Gediminas expanded Lithuania's international connections by conducting correspondence with Pope John XXII as well as with rulers and other centers of power in Western Europe, and he invited German colonists to settle in Lithuania. Responding to Gediminas' complaints about the aggression from the Teutonic Order, the pope forced the Knights to observe a four-year peace with Lithuania in 1324–1327. Opportunities for the Christianization of Lithuania were investigated by the pope's legates, but they met with no success. From the time of Mindaugas, the country's rulers attempted to break Lithuania's cultural isolation, join Western Christendom and thus be protected from the Knights, but the Knights and other interests had been able to block the process. In the 14th century, Gediminas' attempts to become baptized (1323–1324) and establish Catholic Christianity in his country were thwarted by the Samogitians and Gediminas' Orthodox courtiers. In 1325, Casimir, the son of the Polish king Władysław I, married Gediminas' daughter Aldona, who became queen of Poland when Casimir ascended the Polish throne in 1333. The marriage confirmed the prestige of the Lithuanian state under Gediminas, and a defensive alliance with Poland was concluded the same year. Yearly incursions of the Knights resumed in 1328–1340, to which the Lithuanians responded with raids into Prussia and Latvia.

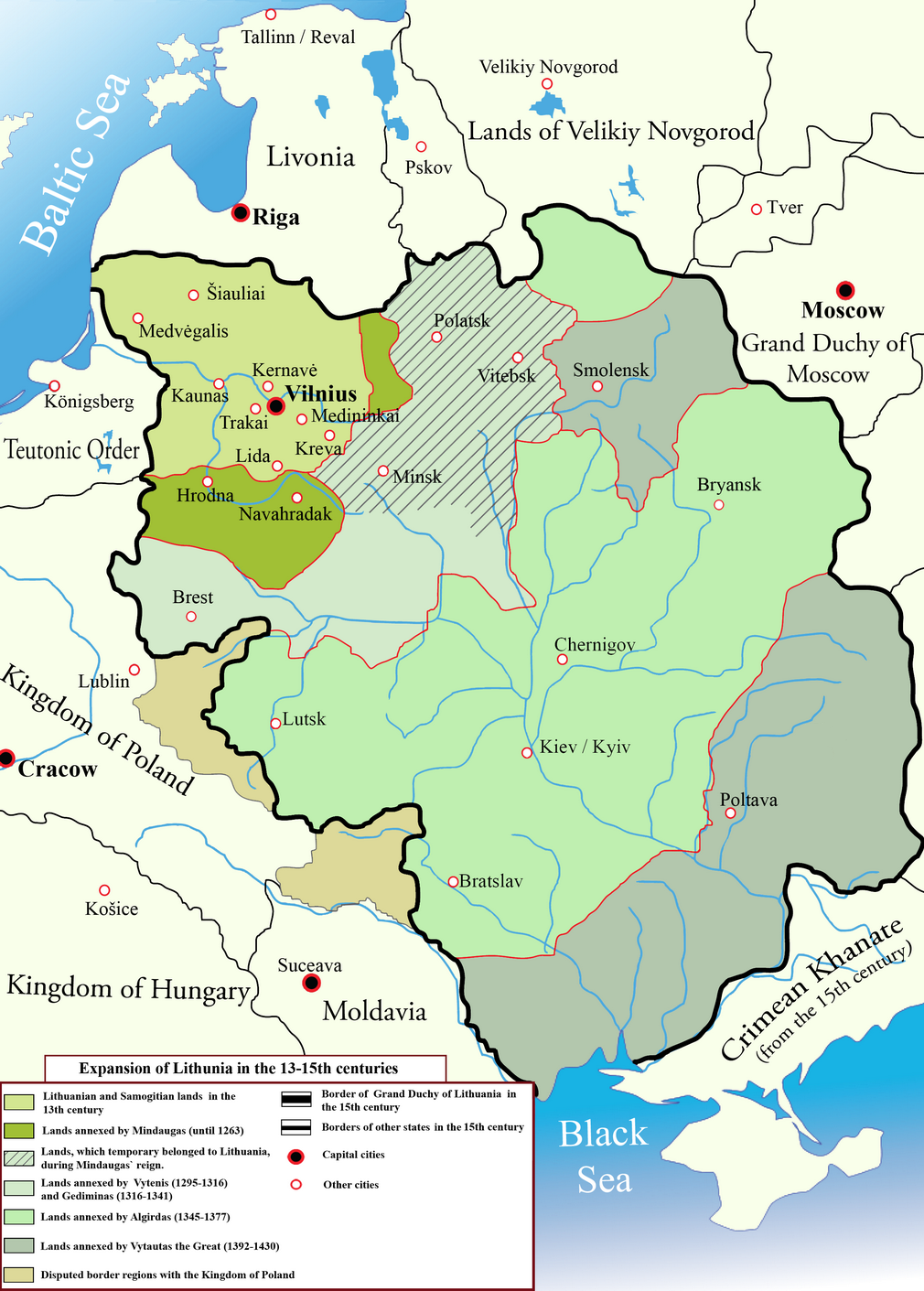
Expansion of the Grand Duchy of Lithuania in the 13–15th centuries

The reign of Grand Duke Gediminas constituted the first period in Lithuanian history in which the country was recognized as a great power, mainly due to the extent of its territorial expansion into Ruthenia. Lithuania was unique in Europe as a pagan-ruled "kingdom" and fast-growing military power suspended between the worlds of Byzantine and Latin Christianity. To be able to afford the extremely costly defense against the Teutonic Knights, it had to expand to the east. Gediminas accomplished Lithuania's eastern expansion by challenging the Mongols, who from the 1230s sponsored a Mongol invasion of Rus'. The collapse of the political structure of Kievan Rus' created a partial regional power vacuum that Lithuania was able to exploit. Through alliances and conquest, in competition with the Principality of Moscow, the Lithuanians eventually gained control of vast expanses of the western and southern portions of the former Kievan Rus'. Gediminas' conquests included the western Smolensk region, southern Polesia and (temporarily) Kyiv, which was ruled around 1330 by Gediminas' brother Fiodor. The Lithuanian-controlled area of Ruthenia grew to include most of modern Belarus and Ukraine (the Dnieper River basin) and comprised a massive state that stretched from the Baltic Sea to the Black Sea in the 14th and 15th centuries.

In the 14th century, many Lithuanian princes installed to govern the Ruthenian lands accepted Eastern Christianity and assumed Ruthenian custom and names in order to appeal to the culture of their subjects. Through this means, integration into the Lithuanian state structure was accomplished without disturbing local ways of life. The Ruthenian territories acquired were vastly larger, more densely populated and more highly developed in terms of church organization and literacy than the territories of core Lithuania. Thus the Lithuanian state was able to function because of the contributions of the Ruthenian culture representatives. Historical territories of the former Ruthenian dukedoms were preserved under the Lithuanian rule, and the further they were from Vilnius, the more autonomous the localities tended to be. Lithuanian soldiers and Ruthenians together defended Ruthenian strongholds, at times paying tribute to the Golden Horde for some of the outlying localities. Ruthenian lands may have been ruled jointly by Lithuania and the Golden Horde as condominiums until the time of Vytautas, who stopped paying tribute. Gediminas' state provided a counterbalance against the influence of Moscow and enjoyed good relations with the Ruthenian principalities of Pskov, Veliky Novgorod and Tver. Direct military confrontations with the Principality of Moscow under Ivan I occurred around 1335.

==== Algirdas and Kęstutis ====
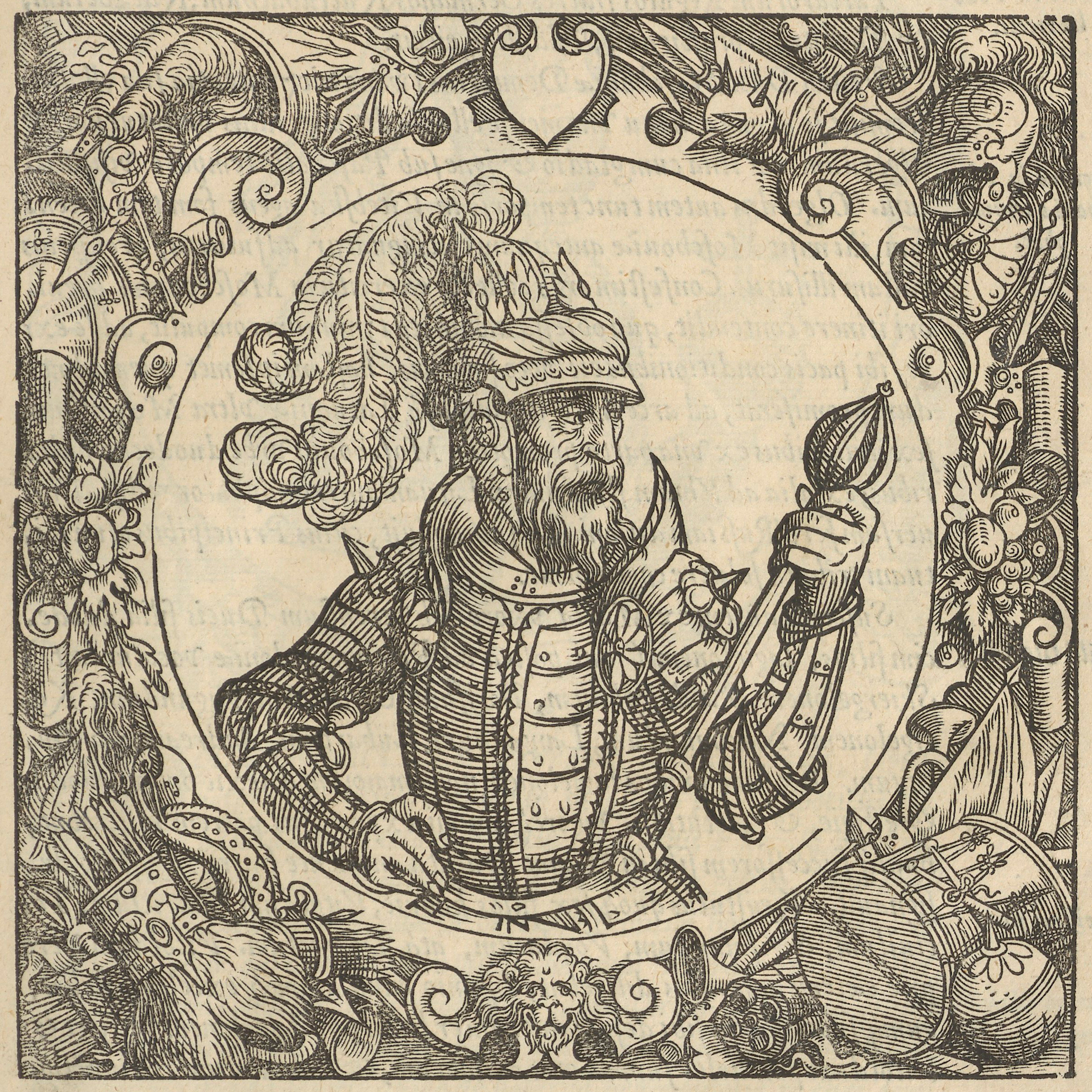
16th-century image of Algirdas, one of the great rulers of 14th-century Europe

Around 1318, Gediminas' elder son Algirdas married Maria of Vitebsk, the daughter of Prince Yaroslav of Vitebsk, and settled in Vitebsk to rule the principality. Of Gediminas' seven sons, four remained pagan and three converted to Orthodox Christianity. Upon his death, Gediminas divided his domains among the seven sons, but Lithuania's precarious military situation, especially on the Teutonic frontier, forced the brothers to keep the country together. From 1345, Algirdas took over as the Grand Duke of Lithuania. In practice, he ruled over Lithuanian Ruthenia only, whereas Lithuania proper was the domain of his equally able brother Kęstutis. Algirdas fought the Golden Horde Tatars and the Principality of Moscow; Kęstutis took upon himself the demanding struggle with the Teutonic Order.

The warfare with the Teutonic Order continued from 1345, and in 1348, the Knights defeated the Lithuanians at the Battle of Strėva. Kęstutis requested King Casimir of Poland to mediate with the pope in hopes of converting Lithuania to Christianity, but the result was negative, and Poland took from Lithuania in 1349 the Halych area and some Ruthenian lands further north. Lithuania's situation improved from 1350, when Algirdas formed an alliance with the Principality of Tver. Halych was ceded by Lithuania, which brought peace with Poland in 1352. Secured by those alliances, Algirdas and Kęstutis embarked on the implementation of policies to expand Lithuania's territories further.

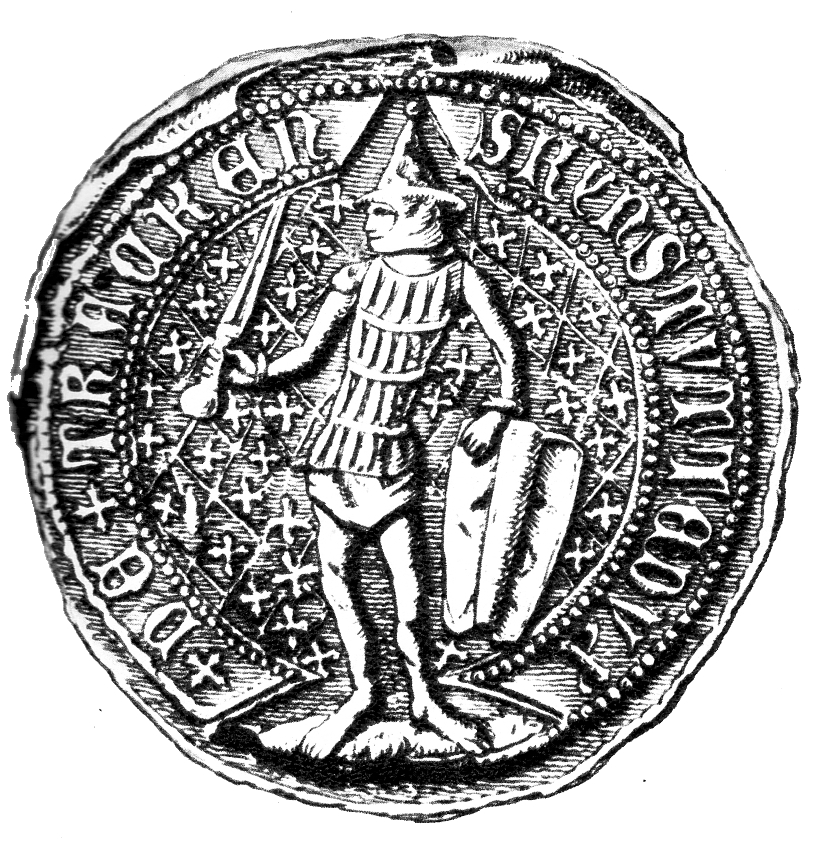
Seal of Kęstutis

Bryansk (in the Principality of Smolensk) was taken in 1359, and in 1362, Algirdas captured Kyiv (in the Principality of Kiev) after defeating the Mongols at the Battle of Blue Waters. Volhynia, Podolia and Left-bank Ukraine were also incorporated. Kęstutis heroically fought for the survival of ethnic Lithuanians by attempting to repel about thirty incursions by the Teutonic Knights and their European guest fighters. Kęstutis also attacked the Teutonic possessions in Prussia on numerous occasions, but the Knights took Kaunas in 1362. The dispute with Poland renewed itself and was settled by the peace of 1366, when Lithuania gave up a part of Volhynia including Volodymyr. A peace with the Livonian Knights was also accomplished in 1367. In 1368, 1370 and 1372, Algirdas invaded the Grand Duchy of Moscow and each time approached Moscow itself. An "eternal" peace (the Treaty of Lyubutsk) was concluded after the last attempt, and it was much needed by Lithuania due to its involvement in heavy fighting with the Knights again in 1373–1377.

The two brothers and Gediminas' other offspring left many ambitious sons with inherited territory. Their rivalry weakened the country in the face of the Teutonic expansion and the newly assertive Grand Duchy of Moscow, buoyed by the 1380 victory over the Golden Horde at the Battle of Kulikovo and intent on the unification of all Rus' lands under its rule.

==== Jogaila's conflict with Kęstutis, Vytautas ====
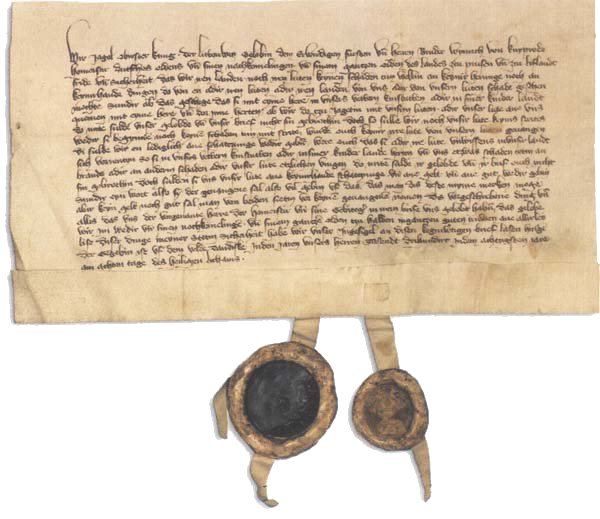
Jogaila's treaty with the Teutonic Knights precipitated the fall of Kęstutis.

Algirdas died in 1377, and his son Jogaila became grand duke while Kęstutis was still alive. The Teutonic pressure was at its peak, and Jogaila was inclined to cease defending Samogitia in order to concentrate on preserving the Ruthenian empire of Lithuania. The Knights exploited the differences between Jogaila and Kęstutis and procured a separate armistice with the older duke in 1379. Jogaila then made overtures to the Teutonic Order and concluded the secret Treaty of Dovydiškės with them in 1380, contrary to Kęstutis' principles and interests. Kęstutis felt he could no longer support his nephew and in 1381, when Jogaila's forces were preoccupied with quenching a rebellion in Polotsk, he entered Vilnius in order to remove Jogaila from the throne. A Lithuanian civil war ensued. Kęstutis' two raids against Teutonic possessions in 1382 brought back the tradition of his past exploits, but Jogaila retook Vilnius during his uncle's absence. Kęstutis was captured and died in Jogaila's custody. Kęstutis' son Vytautas escaped.

Jogaila agreed to the Treaty of Dubysa with the Order in 1382, an indication of his weakness. A four-year truce stipulated Jogaila's conversion to Catholicism and the cession of half of Samogitia to the Teutonic Knights. Vytautas went to Prussia in seek of the support of the Knights for his claims, including the Duchy of Trakai, which he considered inherited from his father. Jogaila's refusal to submit to the demands of his cousin and the Knights resulted in their joint invasion of Lithuania in 1383. Vytautas, however, having failed to gain the entire duchy, established contacts with the grand duke. Upon receiving from him the areas of Grodno, Podlasie and Brest, Vytautas switched sides in 1384 and destroyed the border strongholds entrusted to him by the Order. In 1384, the two Lithuanian dukes, acting together, waged a successful expedition against the lands ruled by the Order.

By that time, for the sake of its long-term survival, the Grand Duchy of Lithuania had initiated the processes leading to its imminent acceptance of European Christendom. The Teutonic Knights aimed at a territorial unification of their Prussian and Livonian branches by conquering Samogitia and all of Lithuania proper, following the earlier subordination of the Prussian and Latvian tribes. To dominate the neighboring Baltic and Slavic people and expand into a great Baltic power, the Knights used German and other volunteer fighters. They unleashed 96 onslaughts in Lithuania during the period 1345–1382, against which the Lithuanians were able to respond with only 42 retributive raids of their own. Lithuania's Ruthenian empire in the east was also threatened by both the unification of Rus' ambitions of Moscow and the centrifugal activities pursued by the rulers of some of the more distant provinces.

==== 13th–14th century Lithuanian society ====
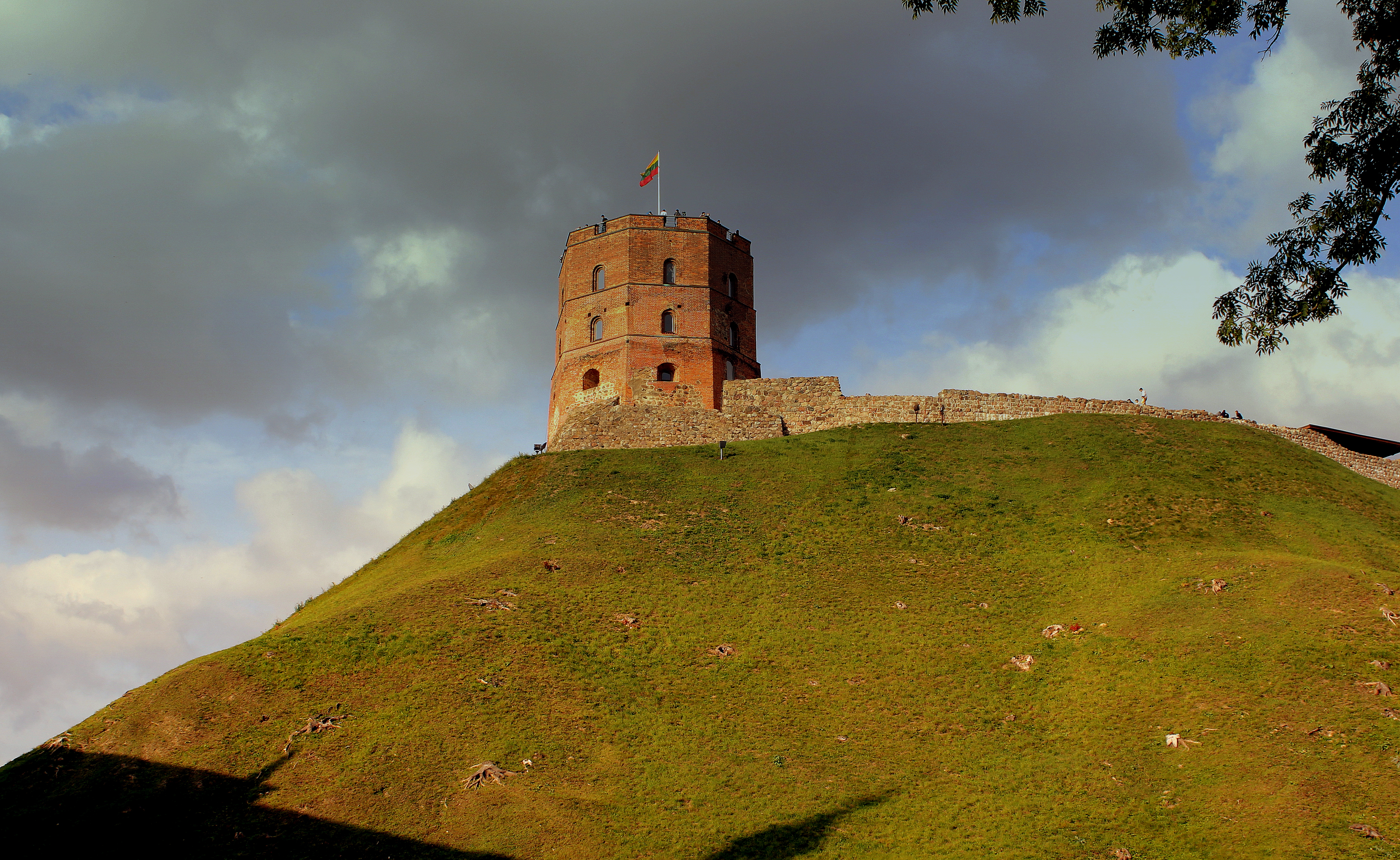
Gediminas' Tower in Vilnius, built under Vytautas

The Lithuanian state of the later 14th century was primarily binational, Lithuanian and Ruthenian (in territories that correspond to the modern Belarus and Ukraine). Of its 800,000 square kilometers total area, 10% comprised ethnic Lithuania, probably populated by no more than 300,000 inhabitants. Lithuania was dependent for its survival on the human and material resources of the Ruthenian lands.

The increasingly differentiated Lithuanian society was led by princes of the Gediminid and Rurik dynasties and the descendants of former kunigas chiefs from families such as the Giedraitis, Olshanski and Svirski. Below them in rank was the regular Lithuanian nobility (or boyars), in Lithuania proper strictly subjected to the princes and generally living on modest family farms, each tended by a few feudal subjects or, more often, slave workers if the boyar could afford them. For their military and administrative services, Lithuanian boyars were compensated by exemptions from public contributions, payments, and Ruthenian land grants. The majority of the ordinary rural workers were free. They were obligated to provide crafts and numerous contributions and services; for not paying these types of debts (or for other offences), one could be forced into slavery.

The Ruthenian princes were Orthodox, and many Lithuanian princes also converted to Eastern Orthodoxy, even some who resided in Lithuania proper, or at least their wives. The masonry Ruthenian churches and monasteries housed learned monks, their writings (including Gospel translations such as the Ostromir Gospels) and collections of religious art. A Ruthenian quarter populated by Lithuania's Orthodox subjects, and containing their church, existed in Vilnius from the 14th century. The grand dukes' chancery in Vilnius was staffed by Orthodox churchmen, who, trained in the Church Slavonic language, developed Chancery Slavonic, a Ruthenian written language useful for official record keeping. The most important of the Grand Duchy's documents, the Lithuanian Metrica, the Lithuanian Chronicles and the Statutes of Lithuania, were all written in that language.

German, Jewish and Armenian settlers were invited to live in Lithuania; the last two groups established their own denominational communities directly under the ruling dukes. The Tatars and Crimean Karaites were entrusted as soldiers for the dukes' personal guard.

Towns developed to a much lesser degree than in nearby Prussia or Livonia. Outside of Ruthenia, the only cities were Vilnius (Gediminas' capital from 1323), the old capital of Trakai and Kaunas. Kernavė and Kreva were the other old political centers. Vilnius in the 14th century was a major social, cultural and trading center. It linked economically central and eastern Europe with the Baltic area. Vilnius merchants enjoyed privileges that allowed them to trade over most of the territories of the Lithuanian state. Of the passing Ruthenian, Polish and German merchants (many from Riga), many settled in Vilnius and some built masonry residencies. The city was ruled by a governor named by the grand duke and its system of fortifications included three castles. Foreign currencies and Lithuanian currency (from the 13th century) were widely used.

The Lithuanian state maintained a patrimonial power structure. Gediminid rule was hereditary, but the ruler would choose the son he considered most able to be his successor. Councils existed, but could only advise the duke. The huge state was divided into a hierarchy of territorial units administered by designated officials who were also empowered in judicial and military matters.

The Lithuanians spoke in a number of Aukštaitian and Samogitian (West-Baltic) dialects. But the tribal peculiarities were disappearing and the increasing use of the name Lietuva was a testimony to the developing Lithuanian sense of separate identity. The forming Lithuanian feudal system preserved many aspects of the earlier societal organization, such as the family clan structure, free peasantry and some slavery. The land belonged now to the ruler and the nobility. Patterns imported primarily from Ruthenia were used for the organization of the state and its structure of power.

Following the establishment of Western Christianity at the end of the 14th century, the occurrence of pagan cremation burial ceremonies markedly decreased.

=== Dynastic union with Poland, Christianization of the state ===
==== Jogaila's Catholic conversion and rule ====
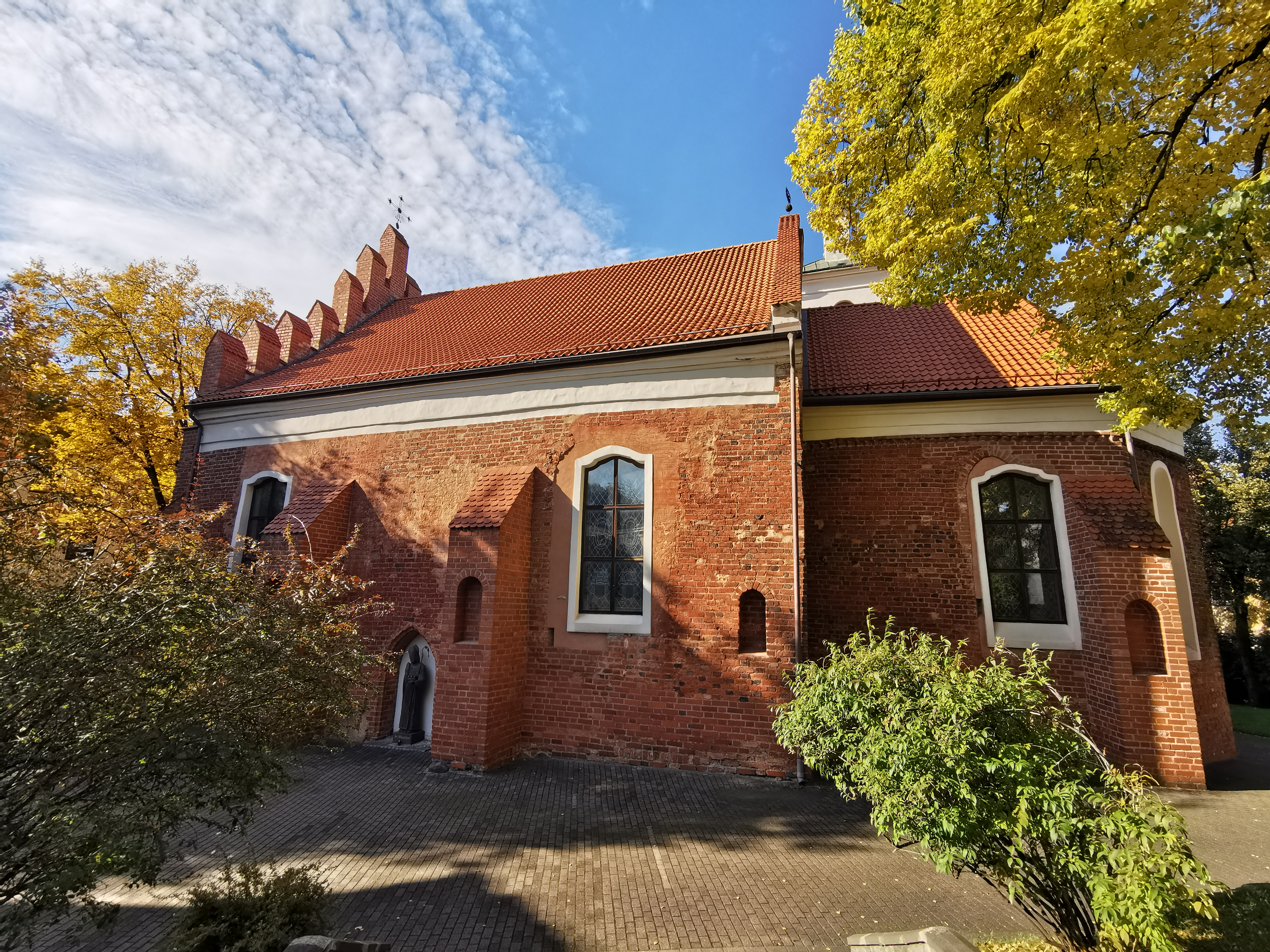
St. Nicholas in Vilnius, the oldest church in Lithuania

As the power of the Lithuanian warlord dukes expanded to the south and east, the cultivated East Slavic Ruthenians exerted influence on the Lithuanian ruling class. They brought with them the Church Slavonic liturgy of the Eastern Orthodox Christian religion, a written language (Chancery Slavonic) that was developed to serve the Lithuanian court's document-producing needs for a few centuries, and a system of laws. By these means, Ruthenians transformed Vilnius into a major center of Kievan Rus' civilization. By the time of Jogaila's acceptance of Catholicism at the Union of Krewo in 1385, many institutions in his realm and members of his family had been to a large extent assimilated already into the Orthodox Christianity and became Russified (in part a result of the deliberate policy of the Gediminid ruling house).

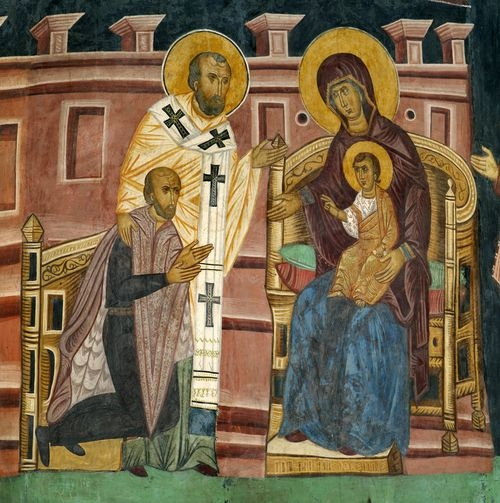
Ruthenian depiction of Christian Jogaila

Catholic influence and contacts, including those derived from German settlers, traders and missionaries from Riga, had been increasing for some time around the northwest region of the empire, known as Lithuania proper. The Franciscan and Dominican friar orders existed in Vilnius from the time of Gediminas. Kęstutis in 1349 and Algirdas in 1358 negotiated Christianization with the pope, the Holy Roman Empire and the Polish king. The Christianization of Lithuania thus involved both Catholic and Orthodox aspects. Conversion by force as practiced by the Teutonic Knights had actually been an impediment that delayed the progress of Western Christianity in the grand duchy.

Jogaila, a grand duke since 1377, was himself still a pagan at the start of his reign. In 1386, agreed to the offer of the Polish crown by leading Polish nobles, who were eager to take advantage of Lithuania's expansion, if he become a Catholic and married the 13-year-old crowned king (not queen) Jadwiga. For the near future, Poland gave Lithuania a valuable ally against increasing threats from the Teutonic Knights and the Grand Duchy of Moscow. Lithuania, in which Ruthenians outnumbered ethnic Lithuanians by several times, could ally with either the Grand Duchy of Moscow or Poland. A Russian deal was also negotiated with Dmitry Donskoy in 1383–1384, but Moscow was too distant to be able to assist with the problems posed by the Teutonic orders and presented a difficulty as a center competing for the loyalty of the Orthodox Lithuanian Ruthenians.

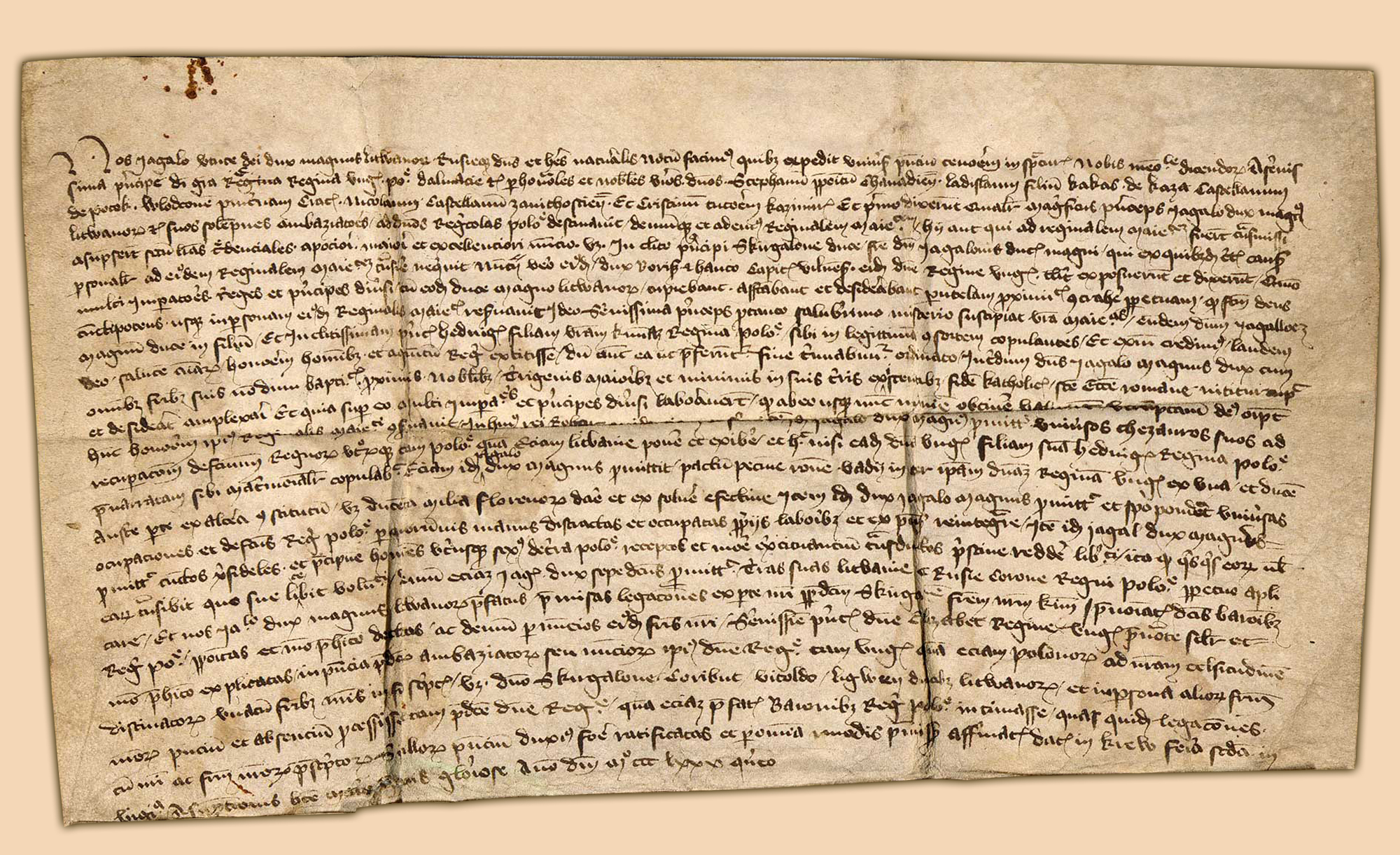
Act of Kreva signed on 14 August 1385

Jogaila was baptized, given the baptismal name Władysław, married Queen Jadwiga, and was crowned King of Poland in February 1386.

Jogaila's baptism and crowning were followed by the final and official Christianization of Lithuania. In the fall of 1386, the king returned to Lithuania and the next spring and summer participated in mass conversion and baptism ceremonies for the general population. The establishment of a bishopric in Vilnius in 1387 was accompanied by Jogaila's extraordinarily generous endowment of land and peasants to the Church and exemption from state obligations and control. This instantly transformed the Lithuanian Church into the most powerful institution in the country (and future grand dukes lavished even more wealth on it). Lithuanian boyars who accepted baptism were rewarded with a more limited privilege improving their legal rights. Vilnius' townspeople were granted self-government. The Church proceeded with its civilizing mission of literacy and education, and the estates of the realm started to emerge with their own separate identities.

Jogaila's orders for his court and followers to convert to Catholicism were meant to deprive the Teutonic Knights of the justification for their practice of forced conversion through military onslaughts. In 1403 the pope prohibited the Order from conducting warfare against Lithuania, and its threat to Lithuania's existence (which had endured for two centuries) was indeed neutralized. In the short term, Jogaila needed Polish support in his struggle with his cousin Vytautas.

==== Lithuania at its peak under Vytautas ====
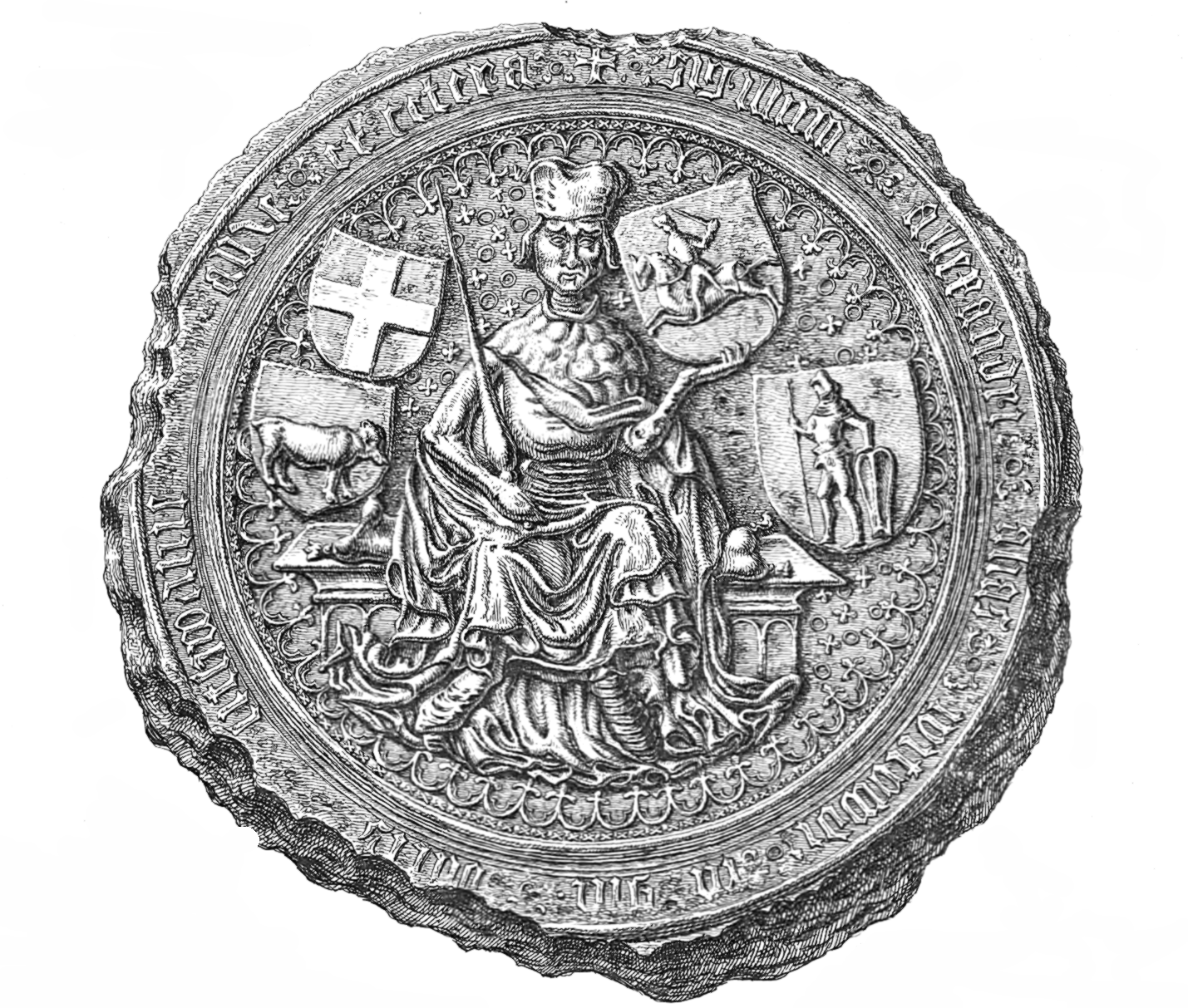
Grand Duke Vytautas, a Lithuanian hero, was Jogaila's first cousin and rival

The Lithuanian Civil War of 1389–1392 involved the Teutonic Knights, the Poles, and the competing factions loyal to Jogaila and Vytautas in Lithuania. Amid ruthless warfare, the grand duchy was ravaged and threatened with collapse. Jogaila decided that the way out was to make amends and recognize the rights of Vytautas, whose original goal, now largely accomplished, was to recover the lands he considered his inheritance. After negotiations, Vytautas ended up gaining far more than that; from 1392 he became practically the ruler of Lithuania, a self-styled "Duke of Lithuania," under a compromise with Jogaila known as the Ostrów Agreement. Technically, he was merely Jogaila's regent with extended authority. Jogaila realized that cooperating with his able cousin was preferable to attempting to govern (and defend) Lithuania directly from Kraków.

Vytautas had been frustrated by Jogaila's Polish arrangements and rejected the prospect of Lithuania's subordination to Poland. Under Vytautas, a considerable centralization of the state took place, and the Catholicized Lithuanian nobility became increasingly prominent in state politics. The centralization efforts began in 1393–1395, when Vytautas appropriated their provinces from several powerful regional dukes in Ruthenia. Several invasions of Lithuania by the Teutonic Knights occurred between 1392 and 1394, but they were repelled with the help of Polish forces. Afterwards, the Knights abandoned their goal of conquest of Lithuania proper and concentrated on subjugating and keeping Samogitia. In 1395, Wenceslaus IV of Bohemia, the Order's formal superior, prohibited the Knights from raiding Lithuania.

In 1395, Vytautas conquered Smolensk, and in 1397, he conducted a victorious expedition against a branch of the Golden Horde. Now he felt he could afford independence from Poland and in 1398 refused to pay the tribute due to Queen Jadwiga. Seeking freedom to pursue his internal and Ruthenian goals, Vytautas had to grant the Teutonic Order a large portion of Samogitia in the Treaty of Salynas of 1398. The conquest of Samogitia by the Teutonic Order greatly improved its military position as well as that of the associated Livonian Brothers of the Sword. Vytautas soon pursued attempts to retake the territory, an undertaking for which needed the help of the Polish king.

During Vytautas' reign, Lithuania reached the peak of its territorial expansion, but his ambitious plans to subjugate all of Ruthenia were thwarted by his disastrous defeat in 1399 at the Battle of the Vorskla River, inflicted by the Golden Horde. Vytautas survived by fleeing the battlefield with a small unit and realized the necessity of a permanent alliance with Poland.

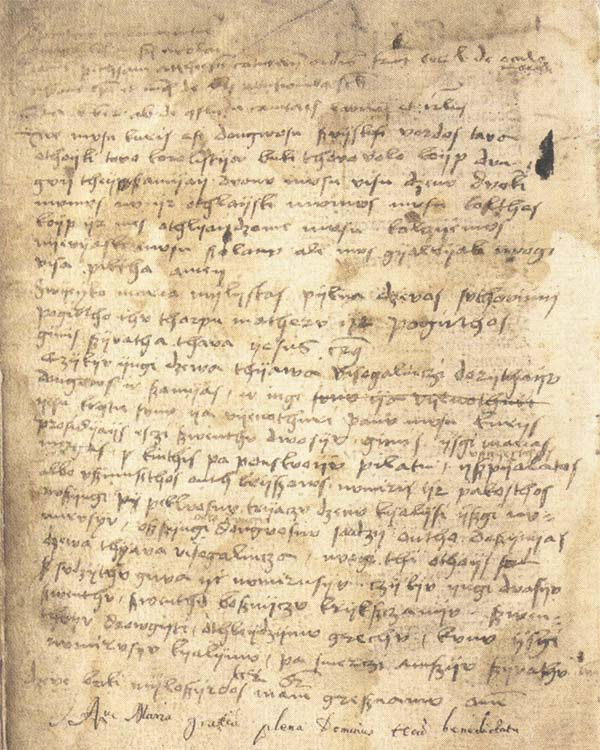
Oldest surviving manuscript in the Lithuanian language (beginning of the 16th century), rewritten from a 15th-century original text

The original Union of Krewo of 1385 was renewed and redefined on several occasions, but each time with little clarity due to the competing Polish and Lithuanian interests. Fresh arrangements were agreed to in the "unions" of Vilnius (1401), Horodło (1413), Grodno (1432) and Vilnius (1499). In the Union of Vilnius, Jogaila granted Vytautas a lifetime rule over the grand duchy. In return, Jogaila preserved his formal supremacy, and Vytautas promised to "stand faithfully with the Crown and the King." Warfare with the Order resumed. In 1403, Pope Boniface IX banned the Knights from attacking Lithuania, but in the same year Lithuania had to agree to the Peace of Raciąż, which mandated the same conditions as in the Treaty of Salynas.

Secure in the west, Vytautas turned his attention to the east once again. The campaigns fought between 1401 and 1408 involved Smolensk, Pskov, Moscow and Veliky Novgorod. Smolensk was retained, Pskov and Veliki Novgorod ended up as Lithuanian dependencies, and a lasting territorial division between the Grand Duchy and Moscow was agreed in 1408 in the treaty of Ugra, where a great battle failed to materialize.

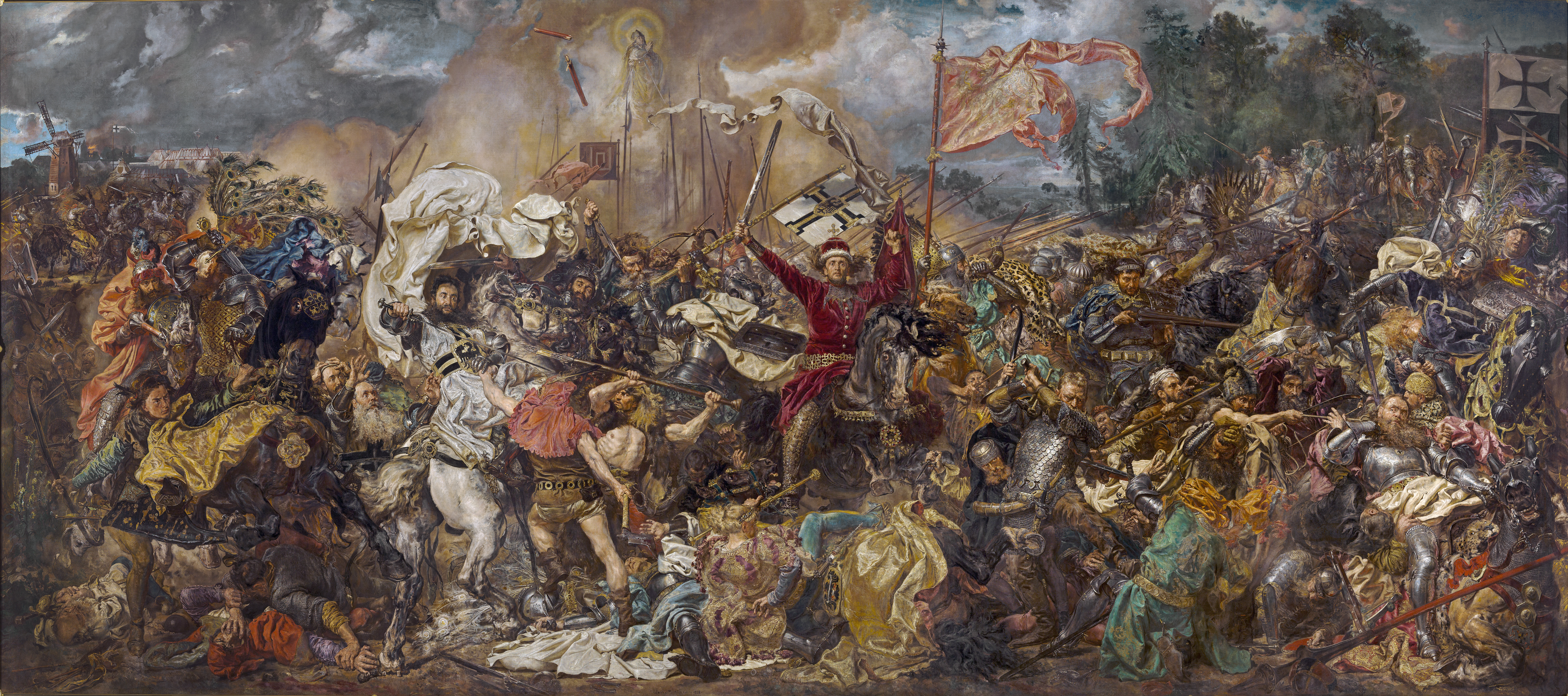
Battle of Grunwald was one of the largest battles in Medieval Europe and is regarded as one of the most important victories in the history of Lithuania

The decisive war with the Teutonic Knights (the Great War) was preceded in 1409 with a Samogitian uprising supported by Vytautas. Ultimately the Lithuanian–Polish alliance was able to defeat the Knights at the Battle of Grunwald on 15 July 1410, but the allied armies failed to take Marienburg, the Knights' fortress-capital. Nevertheless, the unprecedented total battlefield victory against the Knights permanently removed the threat that they had posed to Lithuania's existence for centuries. The Peace of Thorn (1411) allowed Lithuania to recover Samogotia, but only until the deaths of Jogaila and Vytautas, and the Knights had to pay a large monetary reparation.

The Union of Horodło (1413) incorporated Lithuania into Poland again, but only as a formality. In practical terms, Lithuania became an equal partner with Poland, because each country was obliged to choose its future ruler only with the consent of the other, and the Union was declared to continue even under a new dynasty. Catholic Lithuanian boyars were to enjoy the same privileges as Polish nobles (szlachta). 47 top Lithuanian clans were colligated with 47 Polish noble families to initiate a future brotherhood and facilitate the expected full unity. Two administrative divisions (Vilnius and Trakai) were established in Lithuania, patterned after the existing Polish models.

Vytautas practiced religious toleration and his grandiose plans also included attempts to influence the Eastern Orthodox Church, which he wanted to use as a tool to control Moscow and other parts of Ruthenia. In 1416, he elevated Gregory Tsamblak as his chosen Orthodox patriarch for all of Ruthenia (the established Orthodox Metropolitan bishop remained in Vilnius to the end of the 18th century). These efforts were also intended to serve the goal of global unification of the Eastern and Western churches. Tsamblak led an Orthodox delegation to the Council of Constance in 1418. The Orthodox synod, however, would not recognize Tsamblak. The grand duke also established new Catholic bishoprics in Samogitia (1417) and in Lithuanian Ruthenia (Lutsk and Kyiv).

The Gollub War with the Teutonic Knights followed and in 1422, in the Treaty of Melno, the grand duchy permanently recovered Samogitia, which terminated its involvement in the wars with the Order. Vytautas' shifting policies and reluctance to pursue the Order made the survival of German East Prussia possible for centuries to come. Samogitia was the last region of Europe to be Christianized (from 1413). Later, different foreign policies were prosecuted by Lithuania and Poland, accompanied by conflicts over Podolia and Volhynia, the grand duchy's territories in the southeast.

Vytautas' greatest successes and recognition occurred at the end of his life, when the Crimean Khanate and the Volga Tatars came under his influence. Prince Vasily I of Moscow died in 1425, and Vytautas then administered the Grand Duchy of Moscow together with his daughter, Vasily's widow Sophia of Lithuania. In 1426–1428 Vytautas triumphantly toured the eastern reaches of his empire and collected huge tributes from the local princes. Pskov and Veliki Novgorod were incorporated to the grand duchy in 1426 and 1428. At the Congress of Lutsk in 1429, Vytautas negotiated the issue of his crowning as the King of Lithuania with Holy Roman Emperor Sigismund and Jogaila. That ambition was close to being fulfilled, but in the end was thwarted by last-minute intrigues and Vytautas' death. Vytautas' cult and legend originated during his later years and have continued until today.

==== Around the first half of the 15th century ====
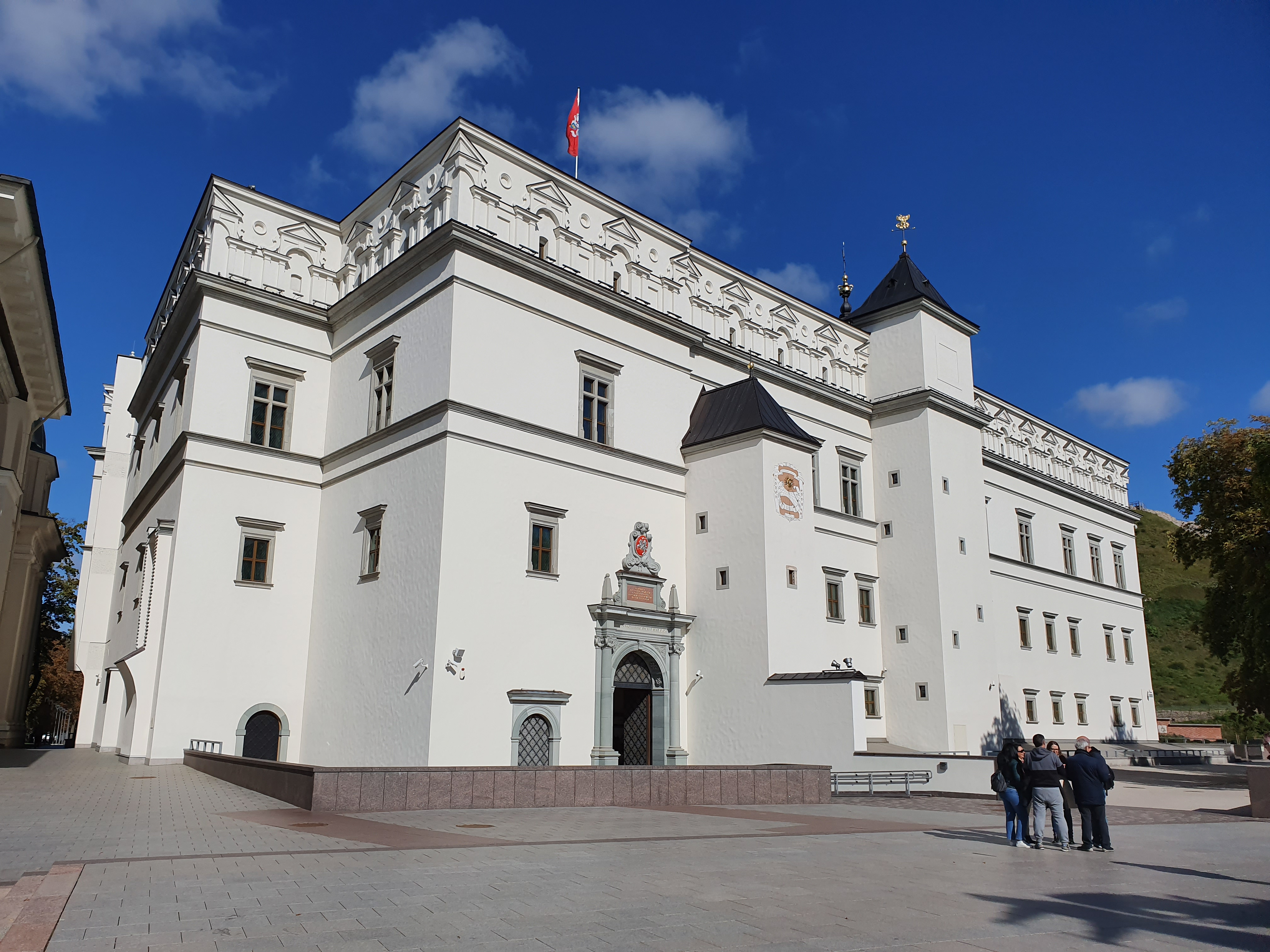
Palace of the Grand Dukes of Lithuania in Vilnius, Lithuania

The dynastic link to Poland resulted in religious, political and cultural ties and increase of Western influence among the native Lithuanian nobility, and to a lesser extent among the Ruthenian boyars from the East, Lithuanian subjects. Catholics were granted preferential treatment and access to offices because of the policies of Vytautas, officially pronounced in 1413 at the Union of Horodło, and even more so of his successors, aimed at asserting the rule of the Catholic Lithuanian elite over the Ruthenian territories. Such policies increased the pressure on the nobility to convert to Catholicism. Ethnic Lithuania proper made up 10% of the area and 20% of the population of the Grand Duchy. Of the Ruthenian provinces, Volhynia was most closely integrated with Lithuania proper. Branches of the Gediminid family as well as other Lithuanian and Ruthenian magnate clans eventually became established there.

During the period, a stratum of wealthy landowners, important also as a military force, was coming into being, accompanied by the emerging class of feudal serfs assigned to them. The Grand Duchy of Lithuania was for the time being largely preserved as a separate state with separate institutions, but efforts, originating mainly in Poland, were made to bring the Polish and Lithuanian elites and systems closer together. Vilnius and other cities were granted the German system of laws (Magdeburg rights). Crafts and trade were developing quickly. Under Vytautas a network of chanceries functioned, first schools were established and annals written. He opened Lithuania for the influence of the European culture and integrated his country with European Western Christianity.

==== Under Jagiellonian rulers ====
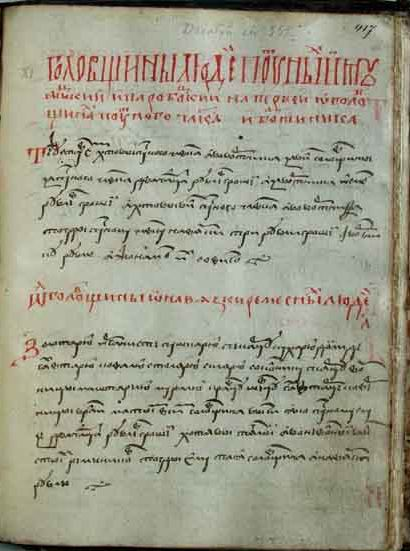
First Lithuanian legal statute, implemented in 1522–1529

Royal insignias of the rulers of Lithuania in the Vilnius Cathedral, 1931

The Jagiellonian dynasty founded by Jogaila (a member of one of the branches of the Gediminids) ruled Poland and Lithuania continuously between 1386 and 1572.

Following the death of Vytautas in 1430, another civil war ensued, and Lithuania was ruled by rival successors. Afterwards, the Lithuanian nobility on two occasions technically broke the union between Poland and Lithuania by selecting grand dukes unilaterally from the Jagiellonian dynasty. In 1440, the Lithuanian great lords elevated Casimir, Jogaila's second son, to the rule of the grand duchy. This issue was resolved by Casimir's election as king by the Poles in 1446. In 1492, Jogaila's grandson John Albert became the king of Poland, whereas his grandson Alexander became the grand duke of Lithuania. In 1501 Alexander succeeded John as king of Poland, which resolved the difficulty in the same manner as before. A lasting connection between the two states was beneficial to Poles, Lithuanians, and Ruthenians, Catholic and Orthodox, as well as the Jagiellonian rulers themselves, whose hereditary succession rights in Lithuania practically guaranteed their election as kings in accordance with the customs surrounding the royal elections in Poland.

On the Teutonic front, Poland continued its struggle, which in 1466 led to the Peace of Thorn and the recovery of much of the Piast dynasty territorial losses. A secular Duchy of Prussia was established in 1525. Its presence would greatly impact the futures of both Lithuania and Poland.

The Tatar Crimean Khanate recognized the suzerainty of the Ottoman Empire from 1475. Seeking slaves and booty, the Tatars raided vast portions of the grand duchy of Lithuania, burning Kyiv in 1482 and approaching Vilnius in 1505. Their activity resulted in Lithuania's loss of its distant territories on the Black Sea shores in the 1480s and 1490s. The last two Jagiellon kings were Sigismund I and Sigismund II Augustus, during whose reign the intensity of Tatar raids diminished due to the appearance of the military caste of Cossacks at the southeastern territories and the growing power of the Grand Duchy of Moscow.

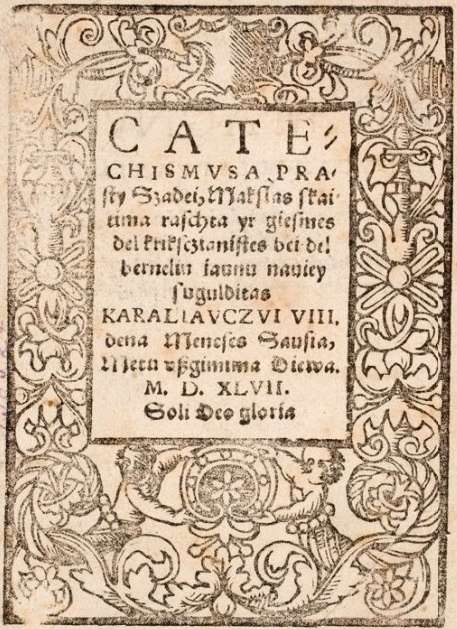
Martynas Mažvydas' Catechism was published in Lithuanian in Königsberg (1547)

Lithuania needed a close alliance with Poland when, at the end of the 15th century, the increasingly assertive Grand Duchy of Moscow threatened some of Lithuania's Rus' principalities with the goal of "recovering" the formerly Orthodox-ruled lands. In 1492, Ivan III of Russia unleashed what turned out to be a series of Muscovite–Lithuanian Wars and Livonian Wars.

In 1492, the border of Lithuania's loosely controlled eastern Ruthenian territory ran less than one hundred miles from Moscow. But as a result of the warfare, a third of the grand duchy's land area was ceded to the Russian state in 1503. Then the loss of Smolensk in July 1514 was particularly disastrous, even though it was followed by the successful Battle of Orsha in September, as the Polish interests were reluctantly recognizing the necessity of their own involvement in Lithuania's defense. The peace of 1537 left Gomel as the grand duchy's eastern edge.

In the north, the Livonian War took place over the strategically and economically crucial region of Livonia, the traditional territory of the Livonian Order. The Livonian Confederation formed an alliance with the Polish-Lithuanian side in 1557 with the Treaty of Pozvol. Desired by both Lithuania and Poland, Livonia was then incorporated into the Polish Crown by Sigismund II. These developments caused Ivan the Terrible of Russia to launch attacks in Livonia beginning in 1558, and later on Lithuania. The grand duchy's fortress of Polotsk fell in 1563. This was followed by a Lithuanian victory at the Battle of Ula in 1564, but not a recovery of Polotsk. Russian, Swedish and Polish-Lithuanian occupations subdivided Livonia.

==== Toward more integrated union ====
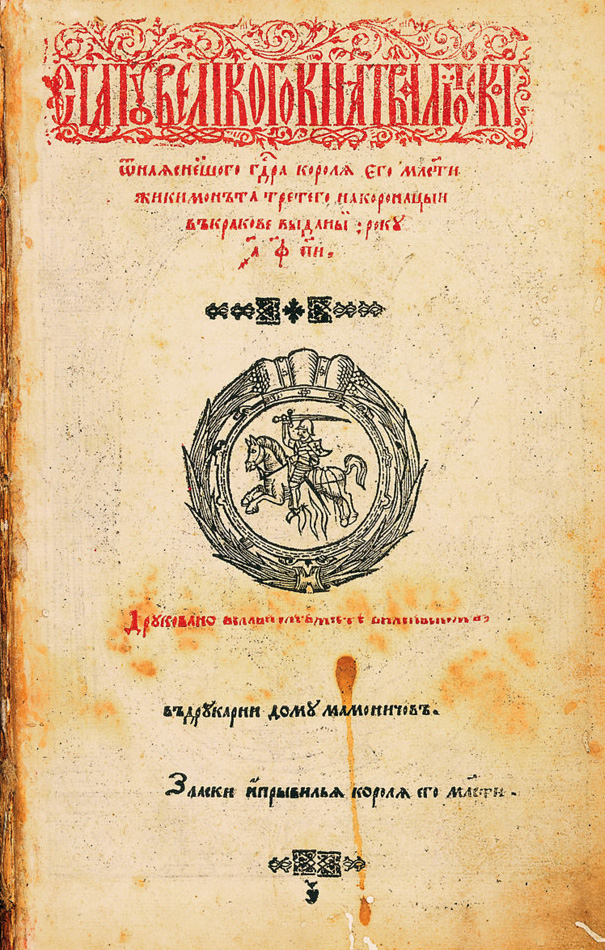
Third Grand Duchy's Statute (1588 legal code) was still written in the Ruthenian language. Lithuanian coat of arms, "the Chase", is shown on the title page

The Polish ruling establishment had been aiming at the incorporation of the Grand Duchy of Lithuania into Poland since before the Union of Krewo. The Lithuanians were able to fend off this threat in the 14th and 15th centuries, but the dynamics of power changed in the 16th century. In 1508, the Polish Sejm voted funding for Lithuania's defense against Muscovy for the first time, and an army was fielded. The Polish nobility's executionist movement called for full incorporation of the Grand Duchy because of its increasing reliance on the support of the Polish Crown against Moscow's encroachments. This problem only grew more acute during the reign of Sigismund II Augustus, the last Jagiellonian king and grand duke of Lithuania, who had no heir who would inherit and continue the personal union between Poland and Lithuania. The preservation of the Polish-Lithuanian power arrangement appeared to require the monarch to force a decisive solution during his lifetime. The resistance to a closer and more permanent union was coming from Lithuania's ruling families, increasingly Polonized in cultural terms, but attached to the Lithuanian heritage and their patrimonial rule.

Legal evolution had lately been taking place in Lithuania nevertheless. In the Privilege of Vilnius of 1563, Sigismund restored full political rights to the Grand Duchy's Orthodox boyars, which had been restricted up to that time by Vytautas and his successors; all members of the nobility were from then officially equal. Elective courts were established in 1565–66, and the Second Lithuanian Statute of 1566 created a hierarchy of local offices patterned on the Polish system. The Lithuanian legislative assembly assumed the same formal powers as the Polish Sejm.

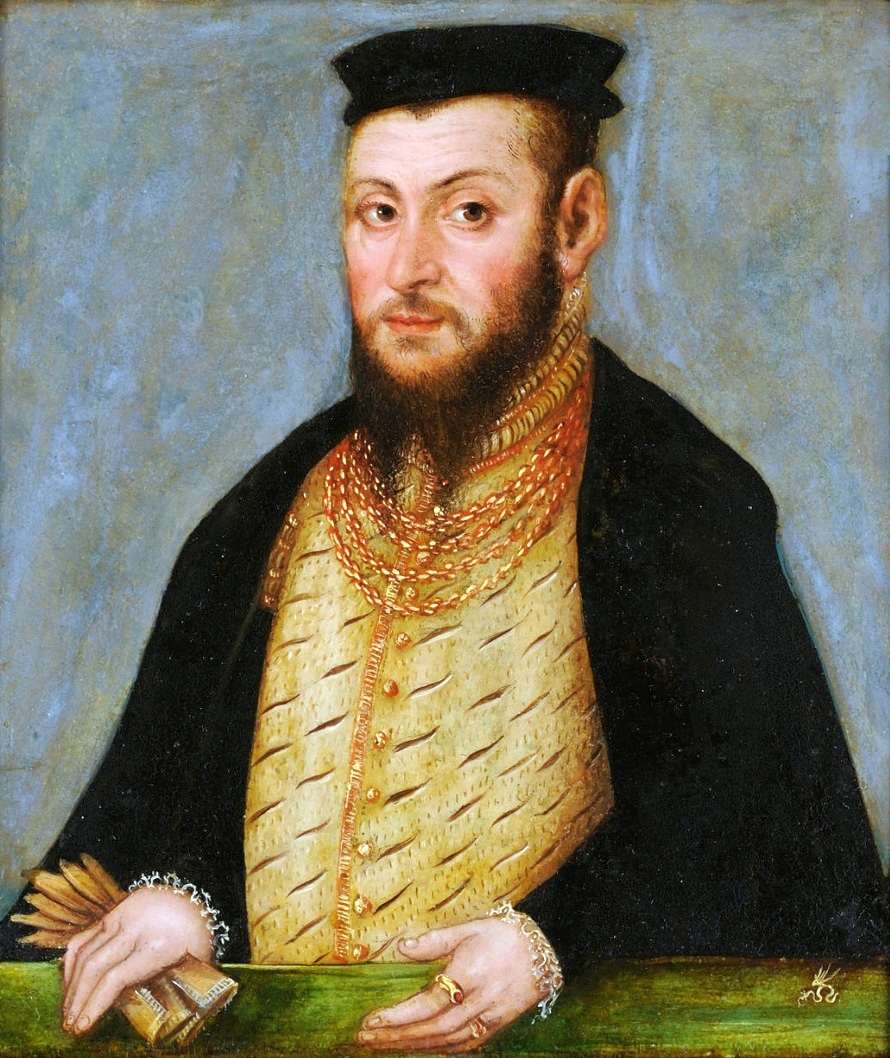
Sigismund II Augustus took decisive steps to ensure preservation of the union after his death

The Polish Sejm of January 1569, deliberating in Lublin, was attended by the Lithuanian lords at Sigismund's insistence. Most left town on 1 March, unhappy with the proposals of the Poles to establish rights to acquire property in Lithuania and other issues. Sigismund reacted by announcing the incorporation of the Grand Duchy's Volhynia and Podlasie voivodeships into the Polish Crown. Soon the large Kiev Voivodeship and Bratslav Voivodeship were also annexed. Ruthenian boyars in the formerly southeastern Grand Duchy mostly approved the territorial transfers, since it meant that they would become members of the privileged Polish nobility. But the king also pressured many obstinate deputies to agree on compromises important to the Lithuanian side. The arm twisting, combined with reciprocal guarantees for Lithuanian nobles' rights, resulted in the "voluntary" passage of the Union of Lublin on July 1. The combined polity would be ruled by a common Sejm, but the separate hierarchies of major state offices were to be retained. Many in the Lithuanian establishment found this objectionable, but in the end they were prudent to comply. For the time being, Sigismund managed to preserve the Polish-Lithuanian state as great power. Reforms necessary to protect its long-term success and survival were not undertaken.

==== Lithuanian Renaissance ====
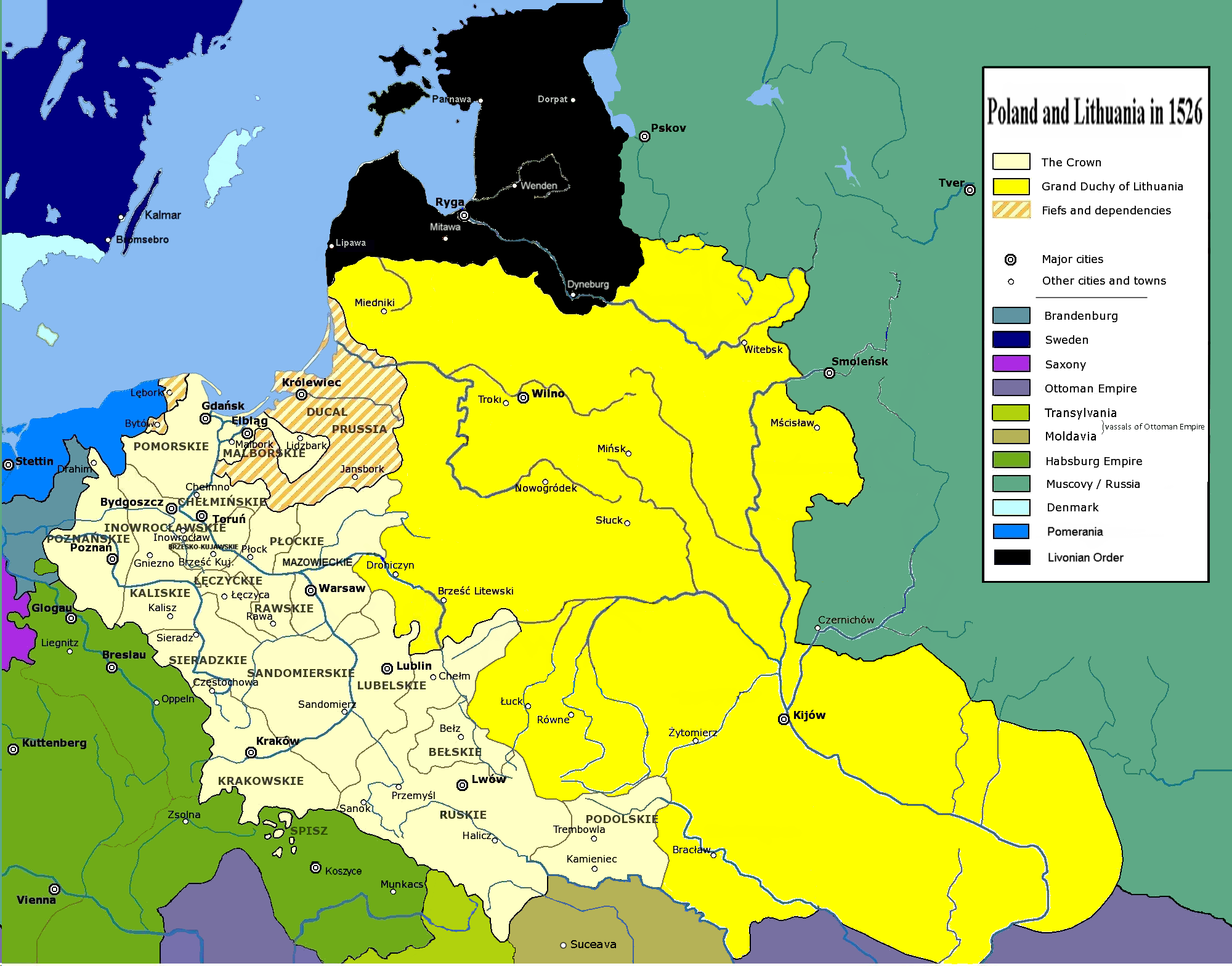
Poland and Lithuania in 1526, before the Union of Lublin

From the 16th to the mid-17th century, culture, arts, and education flourished in Lithuania, fueled by the Renaissance and the Protestant Reformation. The Lutheran ideas of the Reformation entered the Livonian Confederation by the 1520s, and Lutheranism soon became the prevailing religion in the urban areas of the region, while Lithuania remained Catholic.

An influential book dealer was the humanist and bibliophile Francysk Skaryna (c. 1485 – c. 1540), who was the founding father of Belarusian letters. He wrote in his native Ruthenian (Chancery Slavonic) language, as was typical for literati in the earlier phase of the Renaissance in the Grand Duchy of Lithuania. After the middle of the 16th century, Polish predominated in literary productions. Many educated Lithuanians came back from studies abroad to help build the active cultural life that distinguished 16th-century Lithuania, sometimes referred to as Lithuanian Renaissance (not to be confused with Lithuanian National Revival in the 19th century).

At this time, Italian architecture was introduced in Lithuanian cities, and Lithuanian literature written in Latin flourished. Also at this time, the first printed texts in the Lithuanian language emerged, and the formation of written Lithuanian language began. The process was led by Lithuanian scholars Abraomas Kulvietis, Stanislovas Rapalionis, Martynas Mažvydas and Mikalojus Daukša.

== Polish–Lithuanian Commonwealth (1569–1795) ==
=== New union with Poland ===
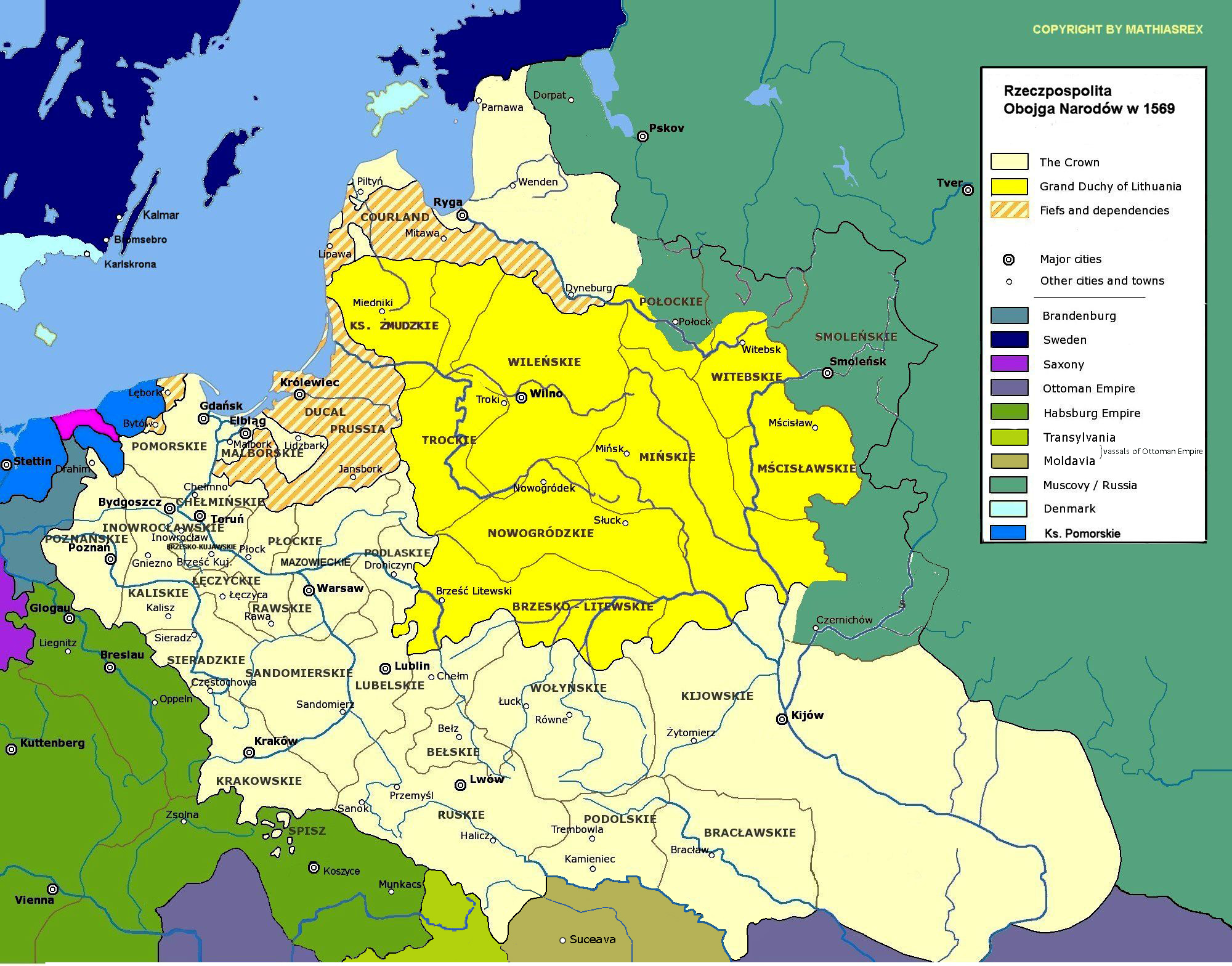
Poland and Lithuania after the Union of Lublin (1569)

With the Union of Lublin of 1569, Poland and Lithuania formed a new state referred to as the Republic of Both Nations, but commonly known as Poland-Lithuania or the Polish–Lithuanian Commonwealth. The Commonwealth, which officially consisted of the Crown of the Kingdom of Poland and the Grand Duchy of Lithuania, was ruled by Polish and Lithuanian nobility, together with nobility-elected kings. The Union was designed to have a common foreign policy, customs and currency. Separate Polish and Lithuanian armies were retained, but parallel ministerial and central offices were established according to a practice developed by the Crown. The Lithuanian Tribunal, a high court for the affairs of the nobility, was created in 1581.

Following the death of Sigismund II Augustus in 1572, a joint Polish–Lithuanian monarch was to be elected as agreed in the Union of Lublin. According to the treaty, the title "Grand Duke of Lithuania" would be received by a jointly elected monarch in the Election sejm on his accession to the throne, thus losing its former institutional significance. However, the treaty guaranteed that the institution and the title "Grand Duke of Lithuania" will be preserved.

On 20 April 1576 the congress of the Grand Duchy of Lithuania's nobles was held in Grodno which adopted an Universal. It was signed by the participating Lithuanian nobles who announced that if the delegates of the Grand Duchy of Lithuania will feel pressure from the Poles in the Election sejm, the Lithuanians will not be obliged by an oath of the Union of Lublin and will have the right to select a separate monarch. On 29 May 1580 a ceremony was held in the Vilnius Cathedral during which bishop Merkelis Giedraitis presented Stephen Báthory (King of Poland since 1 May 1576) a luxuriously decorated sword and a cap adorned with pearls (both were sanctified by Pope Gregory XIII himself). Such ceremony manifested the sovereignty of the Grand Duchy of Lithuania and had the meaning of elevation of the new Grand Duke of Lithuania, thus ignoring the stipulations of the Union of Lublin.

=== Languages ===
The Lithuanian language fell into disuse in the circles of the grand ducal court in the second half of the 15th century in favor of Polish. A century later, Polish was commonly used even by the ordinary Lithuanian nobility. Following the Union of Lublin, Polonization increasingly affected all aspects of Lithuanian public life, but it took well over a century for the process to be completed. The 1588 Statutes of Lithuania were still written in the Ruthenian Chancery Slavonic language, just as earlier legal codifications were. From about 1700, Polish was used in the Grand Duchy's official documents as a replacement for Ruthenian and Latin use. The Lithuanian nobility became linguistically and culturally Polonized, while retaining a sense of Lithuanian identity. The integrating process of the Commonwealth nobility was not regarded as Polonization in the sense of modern nationality, but rather as participation in the Sarmatism cultural-ideological current, erroneously understood to imply also a common (Sarmatian) ancestry of all members of the noble class. The Lithuanian language survived, however, in spite of encroachments by the Ruthenian, Polish, Russian, Belarusian and German languages, as a peasant vernacular, and from 1547 in written religious use.

Western Lithuania had an important role in the preservation of the Lithuanian language and its culture. In Samogitia, many nobles never ceased to speak Lithuanian natively. Northeastern East Prussia, sometimes referred to as Lithuania Minor, was populated mainly by Lithuanians and predominantly Lutheran. The Lutherans promoted publishing of religious books in local languages, which is why the Catechism of Martynas Mažvydas was printed in 1547 in East Prussian Königsberg.

=== Religion ===
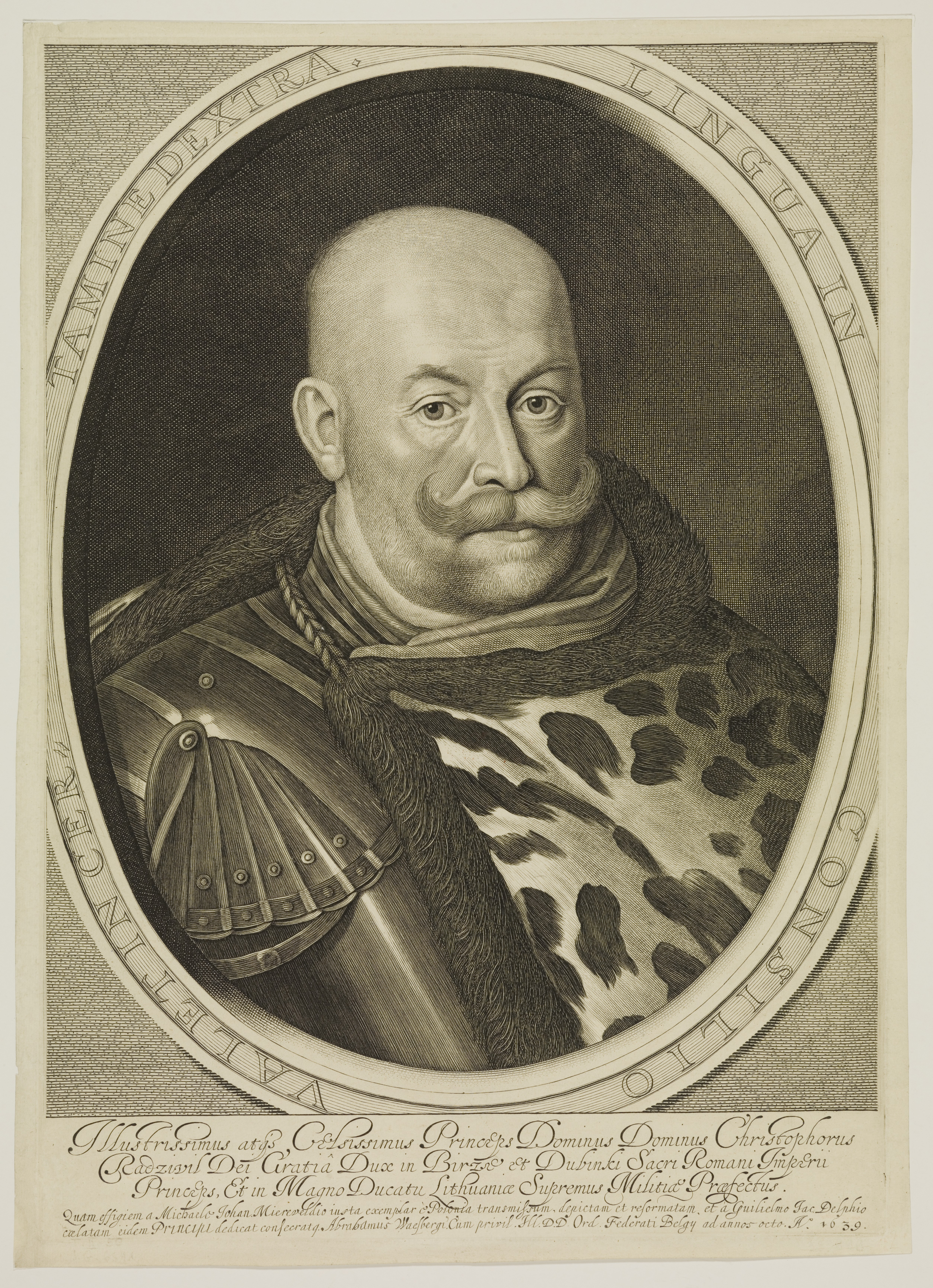
Hetman Kristupas II Radvila (Krzysztof Radziwiłł, 1585–1640), a Lithuanian Calvinist and an accomplished military commander

The predominantly East Slavic population of the Grand Duchy was mostly Eastern Orthodox, and much of the Lithuanian state's nobility also remained Orthodox. Unlike the common people of the Lithuanian realm, at about the time of the Union of Lublin in 1569 large portions of the nobility converted to Western Christianity. Following the Protestant Reformation movement, many noble families converted to Calvinism in the 1550s and 1560s, and typically a generation later, conforming to the Counter-Reformation trends in the Commonwealth, to Roman Catholicism. The Protestant and Orthodox presence must have been very strong, because according to an undoubtedly exaggerated early 17th-century source, "merely one in a thousand remained a Catholic" in Lithuania at that time. (Note: This tiny fraction of Catholics in the early 17th century Grand Duchy is given by Kasper Cichocki (1545–1616), a Catholic parish priest near Sandomierz, who wrote on the subject of the extent of the heresies in the Commonwealth. According to Wacław Urban, Calvinism and Eastern Orthodoxy predominated, and were followed by Catholicism and the Polish Brethren, with Lutheranism being numerically the least significant of the Christian denominations in Lithuania.) In the early Commonwealth, religious toleration was the norm and was officially enacted by the Warsaw Confederation in 1573.

By 1750, nominal Catholics comprised about 80% of the Commonwealth's population, the vast majority of the noble citizenry, and the entire legislature. In the east, there were also the Eastern Orthodox Church adherents. However, Catholics in the Grand Duchy itself were split. Under half were Latin Church with strong allegiance to Rome, worshiping according to the Roman Rite. The others (mostly non-noble Ruthenians) followed the Byzantine Rite. They were the so-called Uniates, whose church was established at the Union of Brest in 1596, and they acknowledged only nominal obedience to Rome. At first the advantage went to the advancing Catholic Church pushing back a retreating Eastern Orthodox Church. However, after the first partition of the Commonwealth in 1772, the Orthodox had the support of the government and gained the upper hand. The Russian Orthodox Church paid special attention to the Uniates (who had once been Orthodox), and tried to bring them back. The contest was political and spiritual, utilizing missionaries, schools, and pressure exerted by powerful nobles and landlords. By 1800, over 2 million of the Uniates had become Orthodox, and another 1.6 million by 1839.

=== Grand Duchy, its grandeur and decline ===
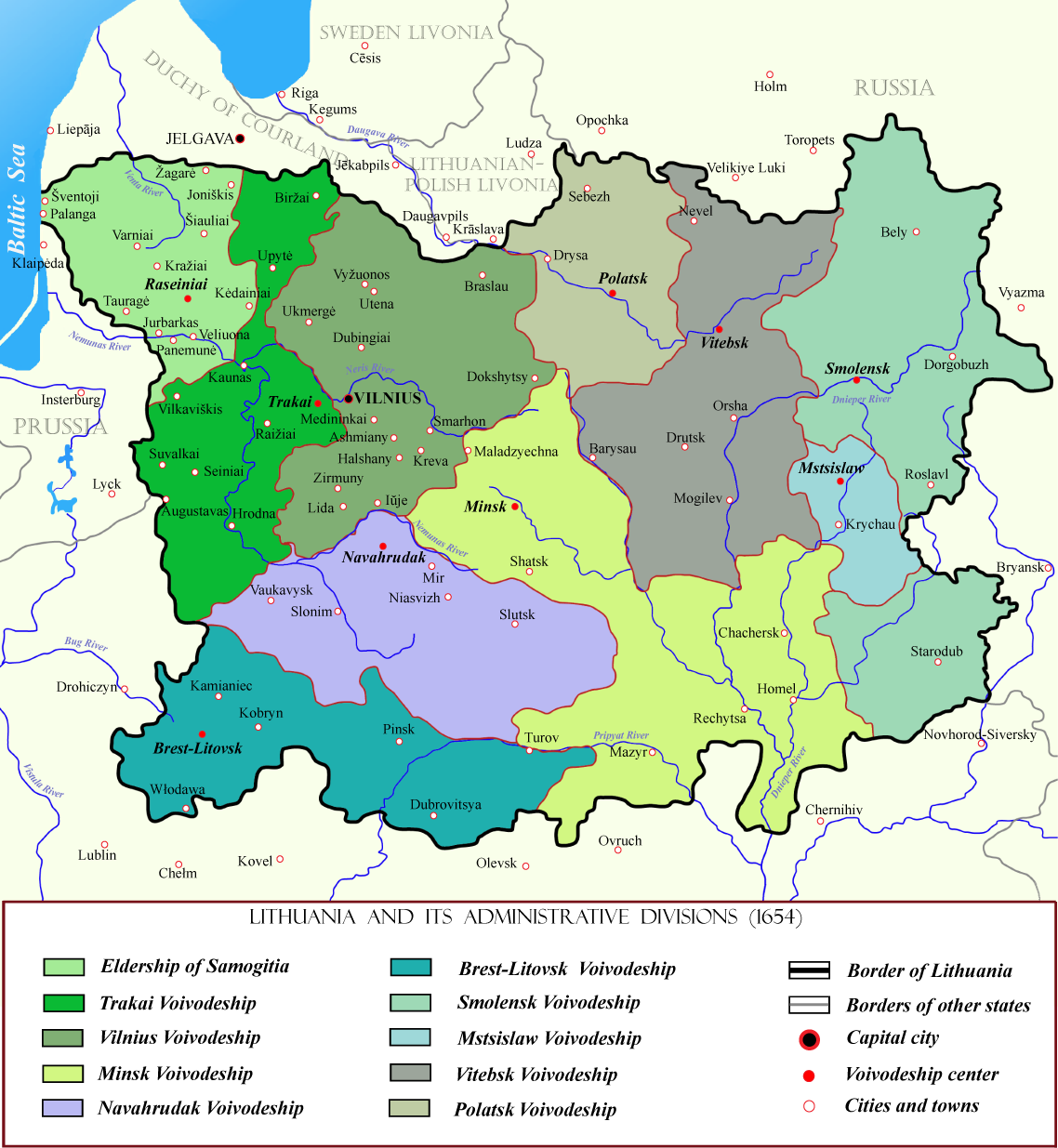
Administrative divisions of the Grand Duchy of Lithuania in the 17th century

The Union of Lublin and the integration of the two countries notwithstanding, Lithuania continued to exist as a grand duchy within the Polish–Lithuanian Commonwealth for over two centuries. It retained separate laws as well as an army and a treasury. At the time of Union of Lublin, King Sigismund II Augustus removed Ukraine and other territories from Lithuania and incorporated them directly into the Polish Crown. The grand duchy was left with today's Belarus and parts of European Russia, in addition to the core ethnic Lithuanian lands. From 1573, the kings of Poland and the grand dukes of Lithuania were always the same person and were elected by the nobility, who were granted ever increasing privileges in a unique aristocratic political system known as the Golden Liberty. These privileges, especially the liberum veto, led to political anarchy and the eventual dissolution of the state.

Within the Commonwealth, the grand duchy made important contributions to European economic, political and cultural life: Western Europe was supplied with grain, along the Danzig to Amsterdam sea route; the early Commonwealth's religious tolerance and democracy among the ruling noble class were unique in Europe; Vilnius was the only European capital located on the border of the worlds of the Western and Eastern Christianity and many religious faiths were practiced there; to the Jews, (Note: The widely used term "Russian Jews" is somewhat misleading, because the Jews within the Russian Empire were allowed to live only within the Pale of Settlement, as determined by Catherine the Great. The Pale coincided largely with the territory of the former Polish–Lithuanian Commonwealth, under Russia the western part of the Empire.) it was the "Jerusalem of the North" and the town of the Vilna Gaon, their great religious leader; Vilnius University produced numerous illustrious alumni and was one of the most influential centers of learning in its part of Europe; the Vilnius school made significant contributions to European architecture in Baroque style; the Lithuanian legal tradition gave rise to the advanced legal codes known as the Statutes of Lithuania; at the end of the Commonwealth's existence, the Constitution of 3 May 1791 was the first comprehensive written constitution produced in Europe. After the Partitions of Poland, the Vilnius school of Romanticism produced the two great poets: Adam Mickiewicz and Juliusz Słowacki.

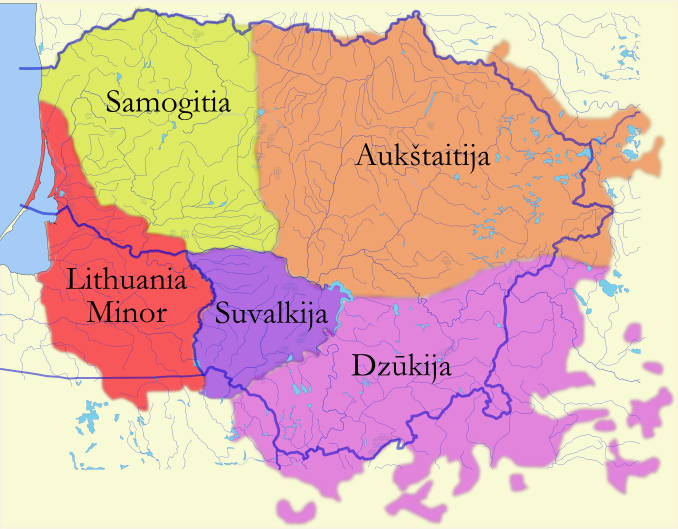
Traditional ethnographic regions of Lithuania proper

The Commonwealth was greatly weakened by a series of wars, beginning with the Khmelnytsky Uprising in Ukraine in 1648. During the Northern Wars of 1655–1661, the Lithuanian territory and economy were devastated by the Swedish army in an invasion known as the Deluge, and Vilnius was burned and looted by the Russian forces. Before it could fully recover, Lithuania was again ravaged during the Great Northern War of 1700–1721.

Besides war, the Commonwealth suffered the Great Northern War plague outbreak and famine (the worst caused by the Great Frost of 1709). These calamities resulted in the loss of approximately 40% of the country's inhabitants. Foreign powers, especially Russia, became dominant players in the domestic politics of the Commonwealth. Numerous factions among the nobility, controlled and manipulated by the powerful Magnates of Poland and Lithuania, themselves often in conflict, used their "Golden Liberty" to prevent reforms. Some Lithuanian clans, such as the Radziwiłłs, counted among the most powerful of Commonwealth nobles.

The Constitution of 3 May 1791 was a culmination of the belated reform process of the Commonwealth. It attempted to integrate Lithuania and Poland more closely, although the separation was preserved by the added Reciprocal Guarantee of Two Nations. Partitions of the Polish–Lithuanian Commonwealth in 1772, 1793 and 1795 terminated its existence and saw the Grand Duchy of Lithuania divided between the Russian Empire, which took over 90% of the Duchy's territory, and the Kingdom of Prussia. The Third Partition of 1795 took place after the failure of the Kościuszko Uprising, the last war waged by Poles and Lithuanians to preserve their statehood. Lithuania ceased to exist as a distinct entity for more than a century.

== Under Imperial Russia, World War I (1795–1918) ==
=== Post-Commonwealth period (1795–1864); foundations of Lithuanian nationalism ===
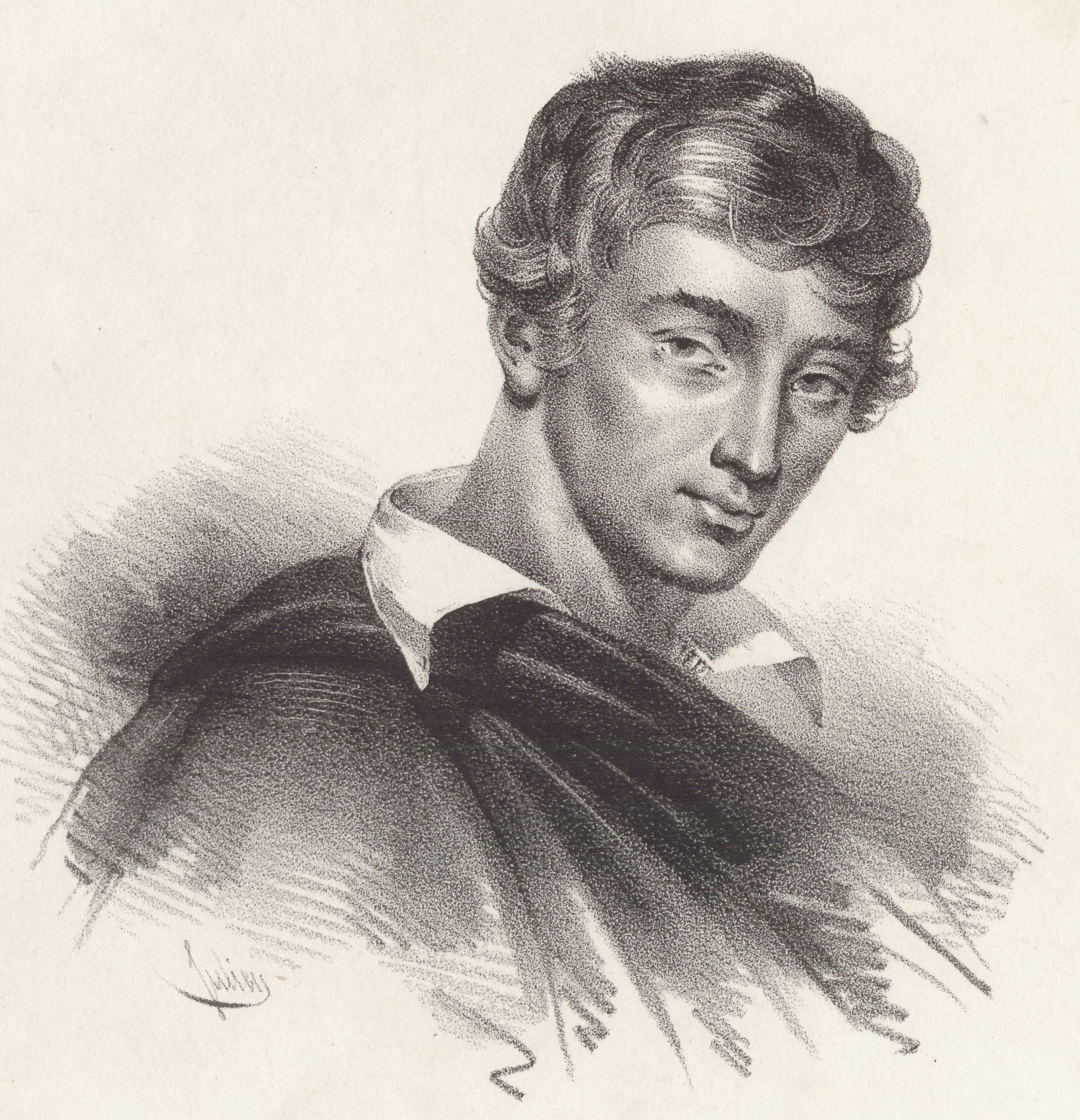
Adam Mickiewicz was a Polish–Lithuanian poet when the Polish–Lithuanian state no longer existed

Following the partitions of the Polish-Lithuanian Commonwealth, the Russian Empire controlled the majority of Lithuania, including Vilnius, which was a part of the Vilna Governorate. In 1803, Tsar Alexander I revived and upgraded the old Jesuit academy as the imperial Vilnius University, the largest in the Russian Empire. The university and the regional educational system was directed on behalf of the tsar by Prince Adam Czartoryski. In the early years of the 19th century, there were signs that Lithuania might be allowed some separate recognition by the Empire, however this never happened.

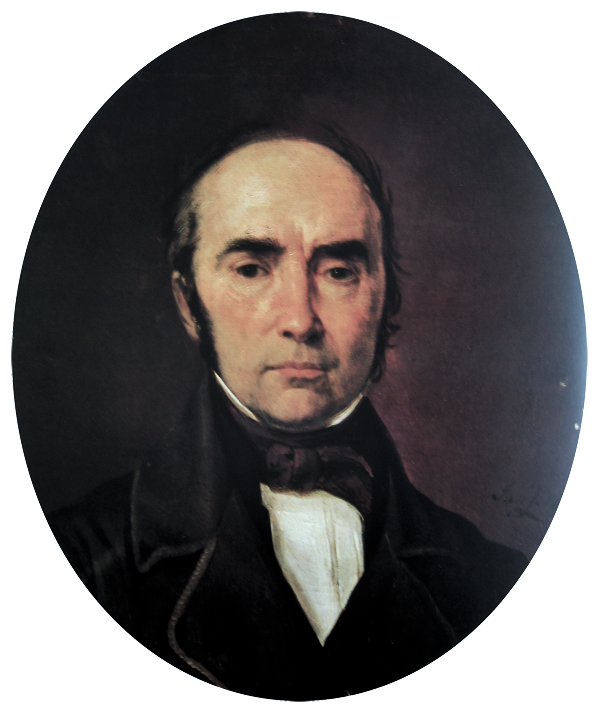
Simonas Daukantas

In 1812, the Lithuanians eagerly welcomed Napoleon Bonaparte's Grande Armée as liberators, with many joining the French invasion of Russia. After the French army's defeat and withdrawal, Tsar Alexander I decided to keep the University of Vilnius open and the Polish-language poet Adam Mickiewicz, a resident of Vilnius in 1815–1824, was able to receive his education there. The southwestern part of Lithuania that was taken over by Prussia in 1795, then incorporated into the Duchy of Warsaw (a French puppet state that existed between 1807 and 1815), became a part of the Russian-controlled Kingdom of Poland ("Congress Poland") in 1815. The rest of Lithuania continued to be administered as a Russian province.

The Poles and Lithuanians revolted against Russian rule twice, in 1830–31 (the November Uprising) and 1863–64 (the January Uprising), but both attempts failed and resulted in increased repression by the Russian authorities. After the November Uprising, Tsar Nicholas I began an intensive program of Russification and the University of Vilnius was closed. Lithuania became part of a new administrative region called the Northwestern Krai. In spite of the repression, Polish language schooling and cultural life were largely able to continue in the former Grand Duchy of Lithuania until the failure of the January Uprising. The Statutes of Lithuania were annulled by the Russian Empire only in 1840, and serfdom was abolished as part of the general Emancipation reform of 1861 that applied to the entire Russian Empire. The Uniate Church, important in the Belarusian part of the former Grand Duchy, was incorporated into the Orthodox Church in 1839.

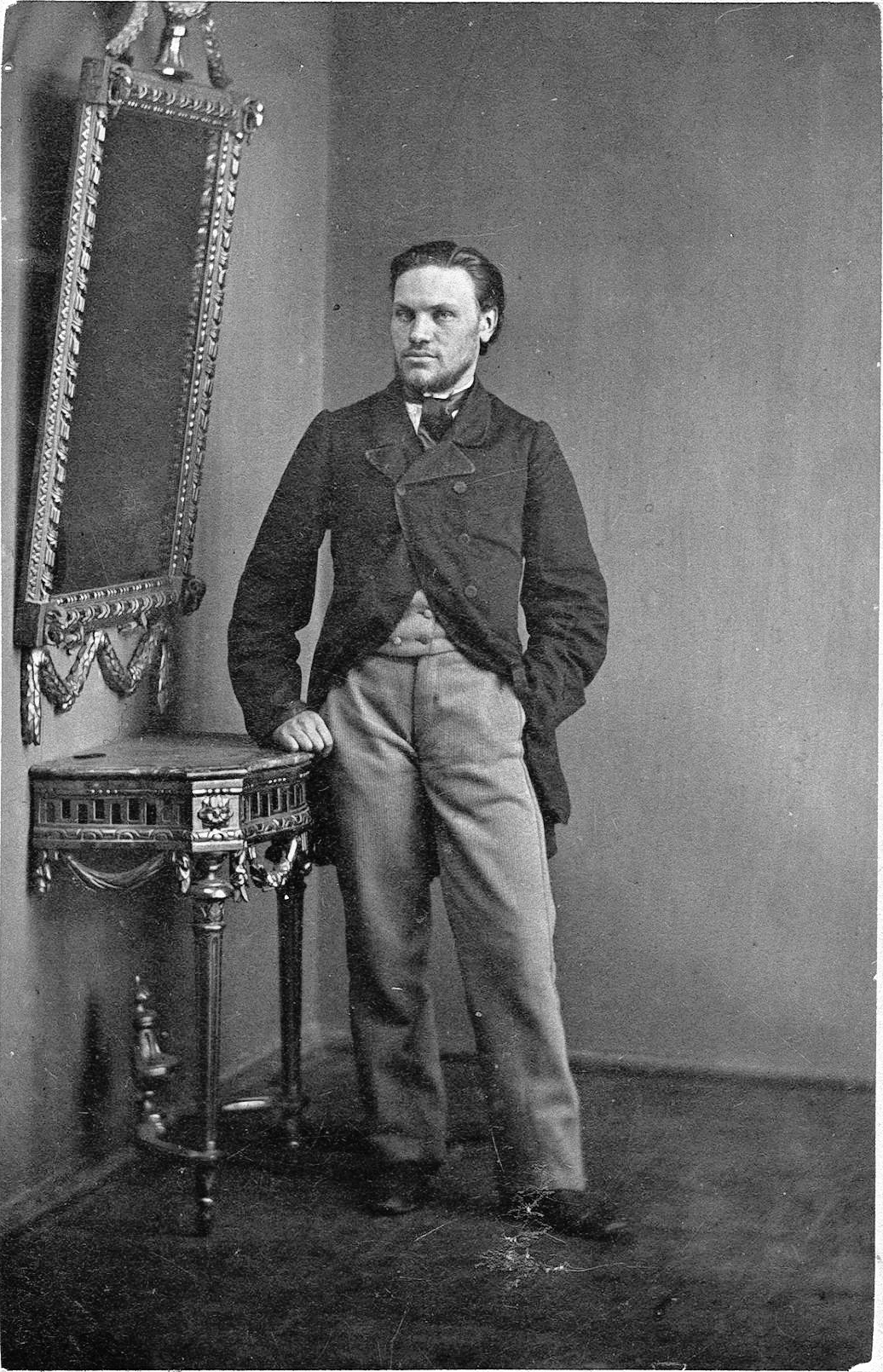
Konstanty Kalinowski

The Polish poetry of Adam Mickiewicz, who was emotionally attached to the Lithuanian countryside and associated medieval legends, influenced ideological foundations of the emerging Lithuanian national movement. Simonas Daukantas, who studied with Mickiewicz at Vilnius University, promoted a return to Lithuania's pre-Commonwealth traditions and a renewal of the local culture, based on the Lithuanian language. With those ideas in mind, he wrote already in 1822 a history of Lithuania in Lithuanian (though still not yet published at that time). Teodor Narbutt wrote in Polish a voluminous Ancient History of the Lithuanian Nation (1835–1841), where he likewise expounded and expanded further on the concept of historic Lithuania, whose days of glory had ended with the Union of Lublin in 1569. Narbutt, invoking the German scholarship, pointed out the relationship between the Lithuanian and Sanskrit languages. It indicated the closeness of Lithuanian to its ancient Indo-European roots and would later provide the "antiquity" argument for activists associated with the Lithuanian National Revival. By the middle of the 19th century, the basic ideology of the future Lithuanian nationalist movement was defined with linguistic identity in mind; in order to establish a modern Lithuanian identity, it required a break with the traditional dependence on Polish culture and language.

Around the time of the January Uprising, there was a generation of Lithuanian leaders of the transitional period between a political movement bound with Poland and the modern Lithuanian nationalist movement based on language. Jakób Gieysztor, Konstanty Kalinowski and Antanas Mackevičius wanted to form alliances with the local peasants, who, empowered and given land, would presumably help defeat the Russian Empire, acting in their own self-interest. This created new dilemmas that had to do with languages used for such inter-class communication and later led to the concept of a nation as the "sum of speakers of a vernacular tongue."

=== Formation of modern national identity and push for self-rule (1864–1918) ===
Modern Lithuania with the former Russian Empire's administrative divisions (governorates) shown (1867–1914).

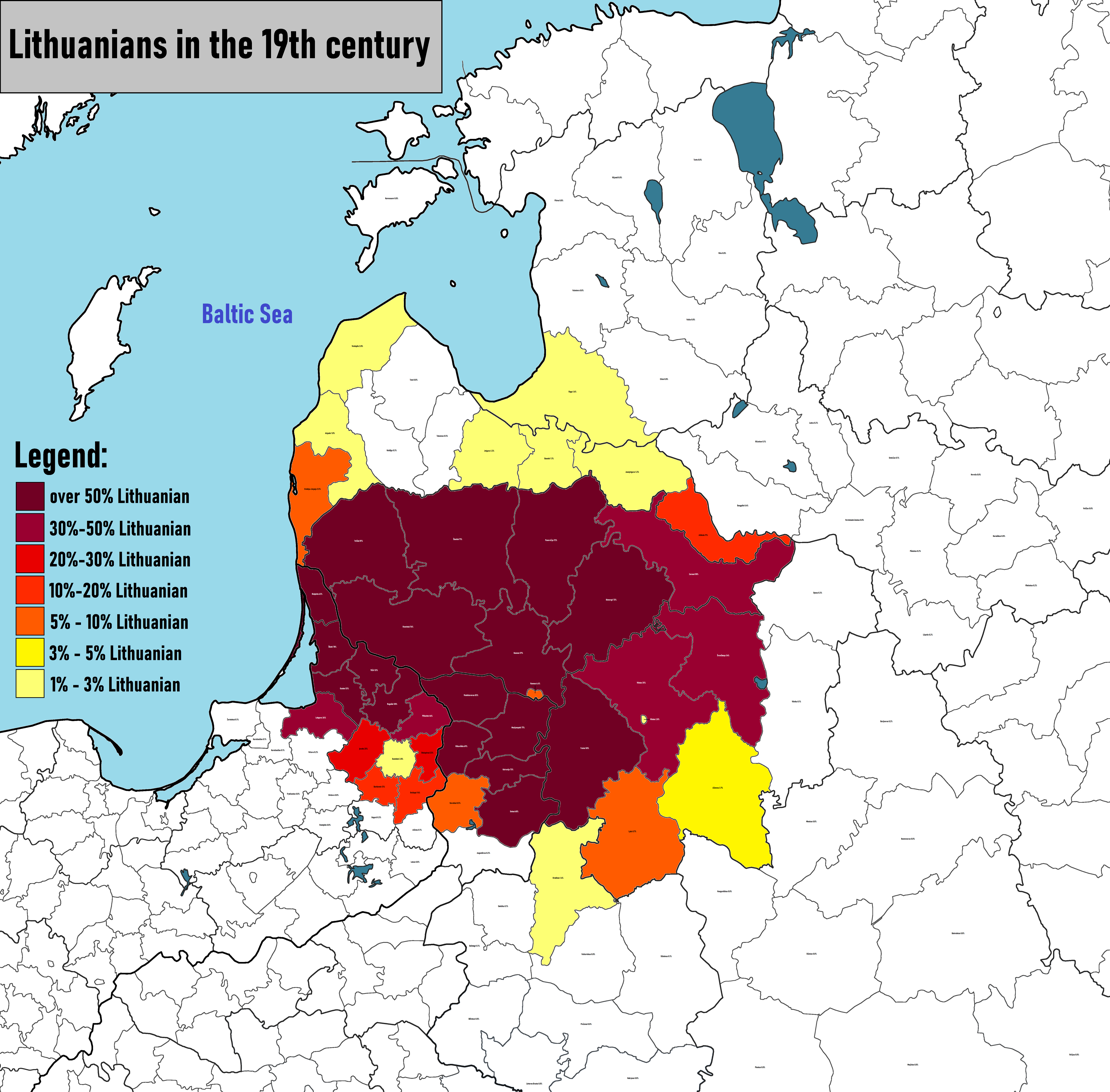
Distribution of ethnic Lithuanian population during the 19th century over 50% Lithuanian 30% – 50% Lithuanian 20% – 30% Lithuanian 10% – 20% Lithuanian 5% – 10% Lithuanian 3% – 5% Lithuanian 1% – 3% Lithuanian

The failure of the January Uprising in 1864 made the connection with Poland seem outdated to many Lithuanians and at the same time led to the creation of a class of emancipated and often prosperous peasants who, unlike often Polonized urban residents, were effectively custodians of the Lithuanian language. Educational opportunities, now more widely available to young people of such common origins, were one of the crucial factors responsible for the Lithuanian national revival. As schools were being de-Polonized and Lithuanian university students sent to Saint Petersburg or Moscow rather than Warsaw, a cultural void resulted, and it was not being successfully filled by the attempted Russification policies.

Russian nationalists regarded the territories of the former Grand Duchy of Lithuania as an East Slavic realm that ought to be (and was being) "reunited" with Russia. In the following decades however, a Lithuanian national movement emerged, composed of activists of different social backgrounds and persuasions, often primarily Polish-speaking, but united by their willingness to promote the Lithuanian culture and language as a strategy for building a modern nation. The restoration of the former Grand Duchy of Lithuania was no longer the objective of this movement, and the territorial ambitions of its leaders were limited to the lands they considered historically Lithuanian.

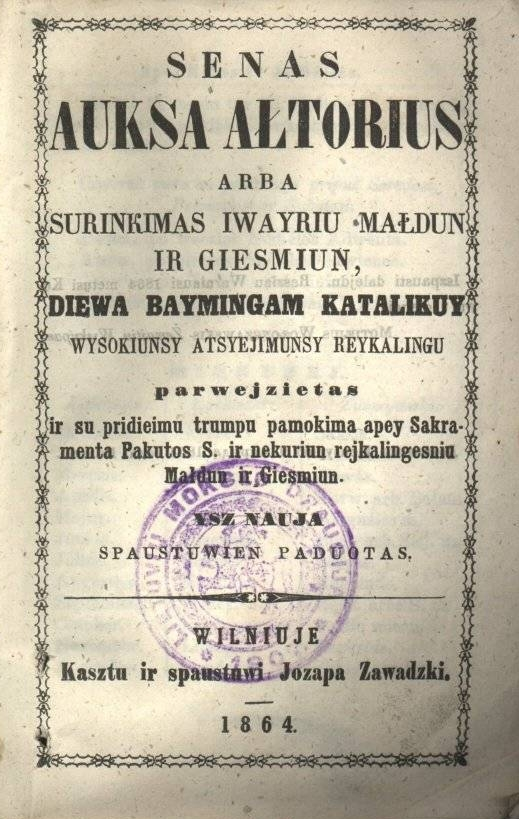
1864 Lithuanian prayer book, printed in the Latin characters and therefore prohibited.

In 1862, Lithuanian parish schools were banned giving rise to a number of clandestine schools. The tsarist authorities implemented a number of Russification policies, including a Lithuanian press ban and the closing of cultural and educational institutions. The prohibition on printing in the Lithuanian language reflected the Russian nationalist policy of "restoration" of the supposedly Russian beginnings of Lithuania. Those were resisted by Lithuanians, led by Bishop Motiejus Valančius, among others. Lithuanians resisted by arranging printing abroad and smuggling of the books in from neighboring East Prussia.

Lithuanian was not considered a prestigious language. There were even expectations that the language would become extinct, as more and more territories in the east were slavicized, and more people used Polish or Russian in daily life. The only place where Lithuanian was considered more prestigious and worthy of books and studying was in East Prussia, sometimes referred to by Lithuanian nationalists as "Lithuania Minor." At the time, northeastern East Prussia was home to numerous ethnic Lithuanians, but even there Germanization pressure threatened their cultural identity.

The language revival spread into more affluent strata, beginning with the release of the Lithuanian newspapers Aušra and Varpas, then with the writing of poems and books in Lithuanian many of which glorified the historic Grand Duchy of Lithuania.

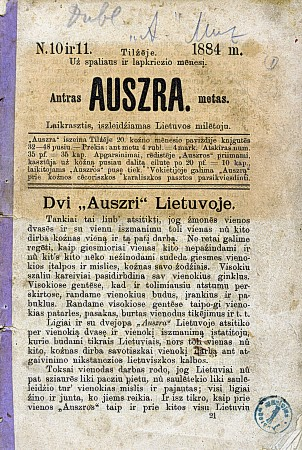
Aušra, originally spelled Auszra, formulated the ideas of Lithuanian nationalism

The two most prominent figures in the revival movement, Jonas Basanavičius and Vincas Kudirka, both originated from affluent Lithuanian peasantry and attended the Marijampolė Gymnasium (secondary school) in the Suwałki Governorate. The school was a Polish educational center, Russified after the January Uprising, with Lithuanian language classes introduced at that time.

Basanavičius studied medicine at the Moscow State University, where he developed international connections, published (in Polish) on Lithuanian history and graduated in 1879. From there he went to Bulgaria, and in 1882 moved to Prague. In Prague he met and became influenced by the Czech National Revival movement. In 1883, Basanavičius began working on a Lithuanian language review, which assumed the form of a newspaper named Aušra (The Dawn), published in Ragnit, Prussia, Germany (now Neman, Russia). Aušra was printed in Latin characters banned under Russian law, which mandated the Cyrillic alphabet for printing Lithuanian. It was smuggled to Lithuania, together with other Lithuanian publications and books printed in East Prussia. The paper (forty issues in total), building on the work of the earlier writers, sought to demonstrate continuities with the medieval Grand Duchy and lionize the Lithuanian people.

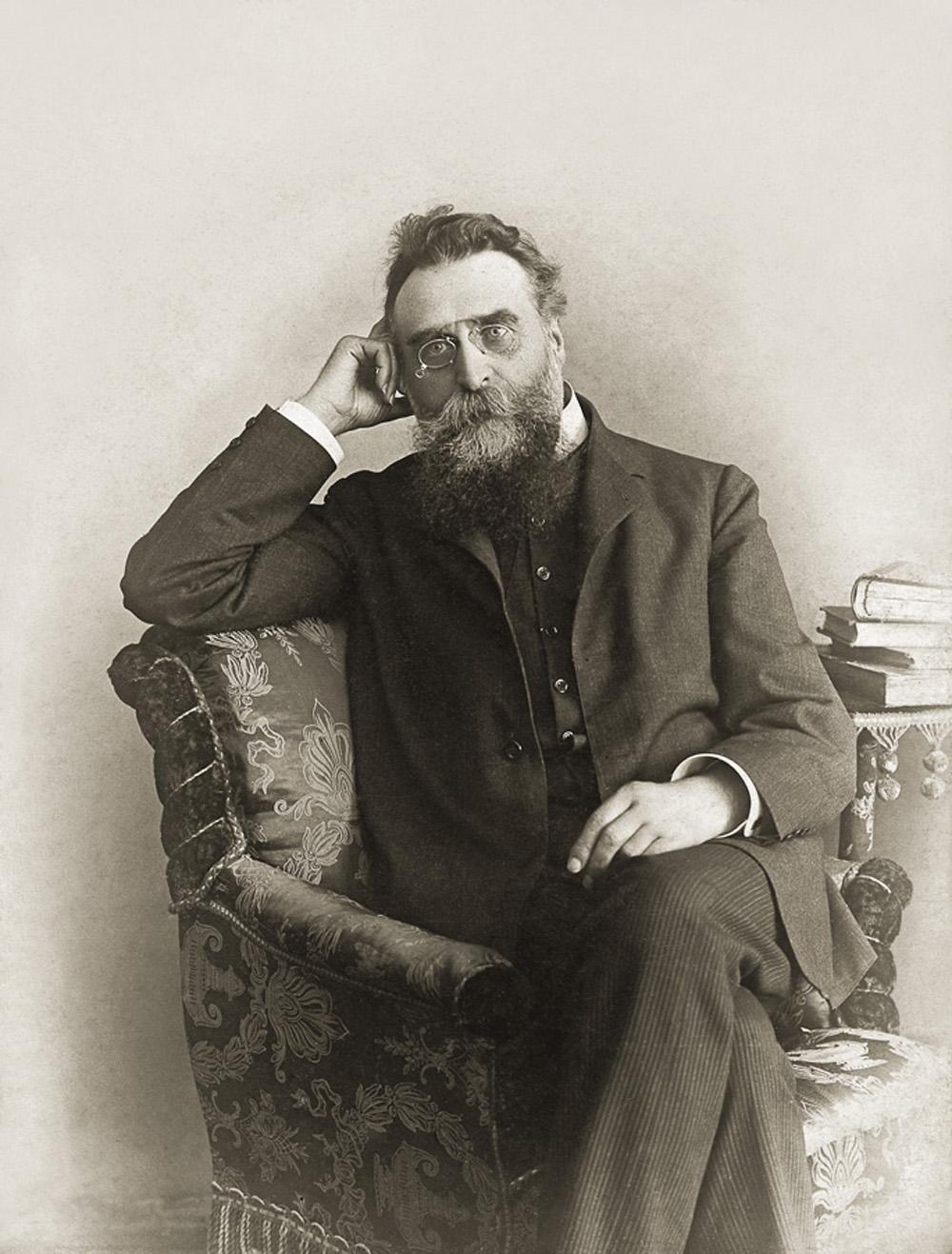
Jonas Basanavičius, a preeminent figure in the Lithuanian National Revival movement

Russian restrictions at Marijampolė secondary school were eased in 1872 and Kudirka learned Polish there. He went on to study at the University of Warsaw, where he was influenced by Polish socialists. In 1889, Kudirka returned to Lithuania and worked on incorporating the Lithuanian peasantry into mainstream politics as the main building block of a modern nation. In 1898, he wrote a poem inspired by the opening strophe of Mickiewicz's epic poem Pan Tadeusz: "Lithuania, my fatherland! You are like health." The poem became the national anthem of Lithuania, Tautiška giesmė: ("Lithuania, Our Homeland").

As the revival grew, Russian policy became harsher. Attacks took place against Catholic churches while the ban forbidding the Lithuanian press continued until May 1904. Some 2,500 books were published in the Lithuanian Latin alphabet. The majority of these were published in Tilsit, Kingdom of Prussia (now Russian Sovetsk, Kaliningrad Oblast), although some publications reached Lithuania from the United States. A largely standardized written language was achieved by 1900, based on historical and Aukštaitijan (highland) usages. The letters -č-, -š- and -v- were taken from the modern (redesigned) Czech orthography, to avoid the Polish usage for corresponding sounds. The widely accepted Lithuanian Grammar, by Jonas Jablonskis, appeared in 1901.

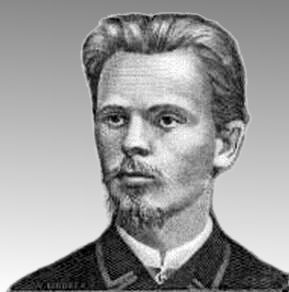
Vincas Kudirka

Large numbers of Lithuanians had emigrated to the United States in 1867–1868 after a famine in Lithuania. Between 1868 and 1914, approximately 635,000 people, almost 20 percent of the population, left Lithuania. Lithuanian cities and towns were growing under the Russian rule, but the country remained underdeveloped by the European standards and job opportunities were limited; many Lithuanians left also for the industrial centers of the Russian Empire, such as Riga and Saint Petersburg. Many of Lithuania's cities were dominated by non-Lithuanian-speaking Jews and Poles.

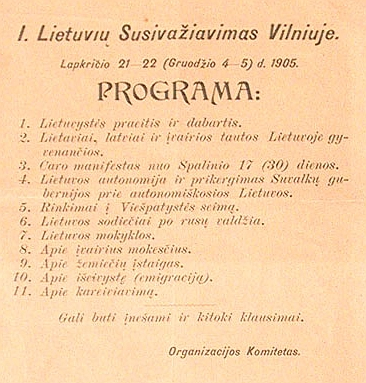
A flyer with a proposed agenda for the Great Seimas of Vilnius; it was rejected by the delegates and a more politically activist schedule was adopted

Lithuania's nationalist movement continued to grow. During the 1905 Russian Revolution, a large congress of Lithuanian representatives in Vilnius known as the Great Seimas of Vilnius demanded provincial autonomy for Lithuania (by which they meant the northwestern portion of the former Grand Duchy of Lithuania) on 5 December of that year. The tsarist regime made a number of concessions as the result of the 1905 uprising. The Baltic states once again were permitted to use their native languages in schooling and public discourse, and Catholic churches were built in Lithuania. Latin characters replaced the Cyrillic alphabet that had been forced upon Lithuanians for four decades. But not even Russian liberals were prepared to concede autonomy similar to that that had already existed in Estonia and Latvia, albeit under Baltic German hegemony. Many Baltic Germans looked toward aligning the Baltics (Lithuania and Courland in particular) with Germany.

After the Russian entry into World War I, the German Empire occupied Lithuania and Courland in 1915. Vilnius fell to the Imperial German Army on 19 September 1915. An alliance with Germany in opposition to both tsarist Russia and Lithuanian nationalism became for the Baltic Germans a real possibility. Lithuania was incorporated into Ober Ost under a German government of occupation. As open annexation could result in a public-relations backlash, the Germans planned to form a network of formally independent states that would in fact be dependent on Germany.

== Independence (1918–1940) ==
=== Declaration of independence ===
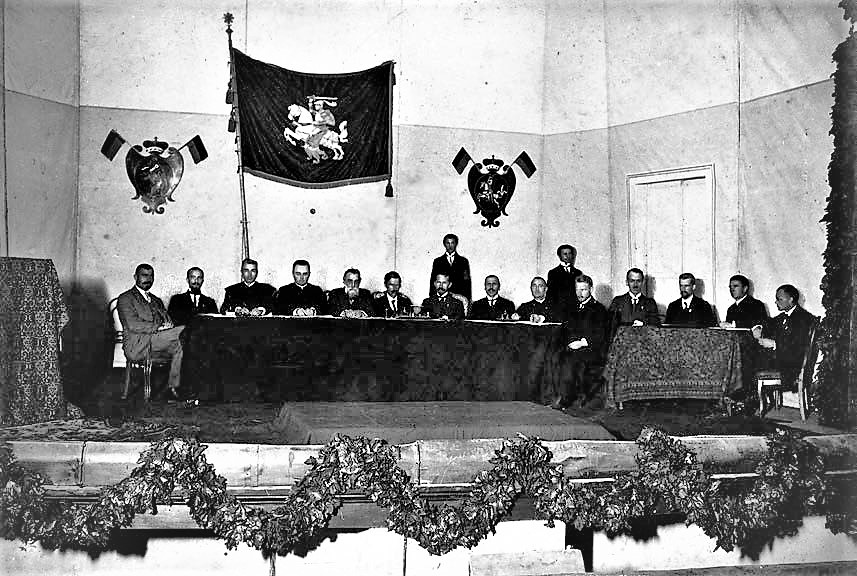
Presidium and secretariat of the Vilnius Conference

The German occupation government permitted a Vilnius Conference to convene between 18 and 22 September 1917, with the demand that Lithuanians declare loyalty to Germany and agree to an annexation. The intent of the conferees was to begin the process of establishing a Lithuanian state based on ethnic identity and language that would be independent of the Russian Empire, Poland, and the German Empire. The mechanism for this process was to be decided by a constituent assembly, but the German government would not permit elections. Furthermore, the publication of the conference's resolution calling for the creation of a Lithuanian state and elections for a constituent assembly was not allowed. The Conference nonetheless elected a 20-member Council of Lithuania (Taryba) and empowered it to act as the executive authority of the Lithuanian people. The Council, led by Jonas Basanavičius, declared Lithuanian independence as a German protectorate on 11 December 1917, and then adopted the outright Act of Independence of Lithuania on 16 February 1918. It proclaimed Lithuania as an independent republic, organized according to democratic principles. The Germans, weakened by the losses on the Western Front, but still present in the country, did not support such a declaration and hindered attempts to establish actual independence. To prevent being incorporated into the German Empire, Lithuanians elected Monaco-born King Mindaugas II as the titular monarch of the Kingdom of Lithuania in July 1918. Mindaugas II never assumed the throne, however.

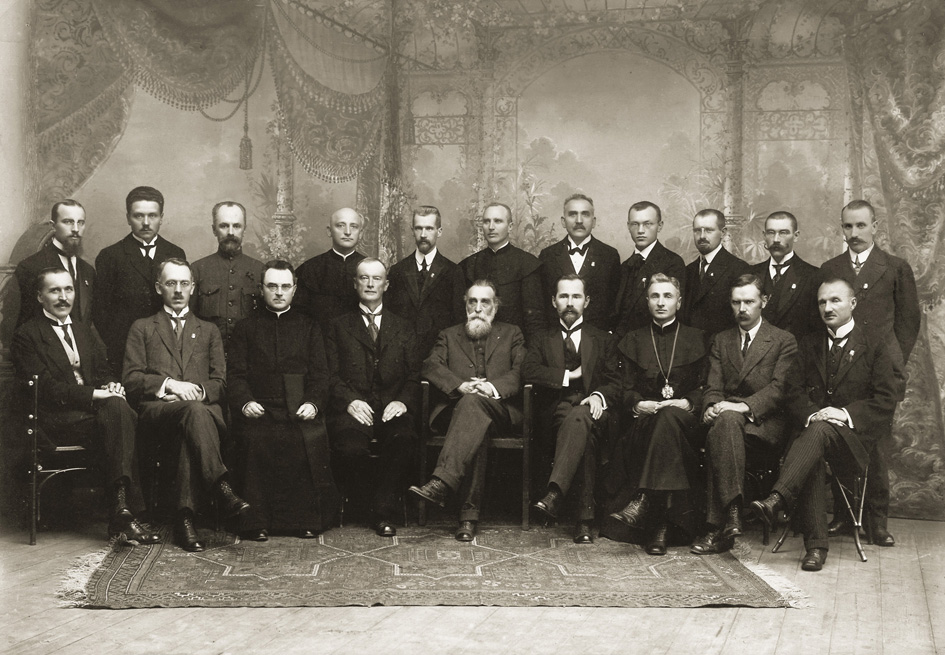
The original twenty members of the Council of Lithuania

In the meantime, an attempt to revive the Grand Duchy of Lithuania as a socialist multi-national federal republic was also taking place under the German occupation. In March 1918, Anton Luckievich and his Belarusian National Council proclaimed a Belarusian People's Republic that was to include Vilnius. Luckievich and the Council fled the Red Army approaching from Russia and left Minsk before it was taken over by the Bolsheviks in December 1918. Upon their arrival in Vilnius, they proposed a Belarusian-Lithuanian federation, which however generated no interest on the part of the Lithuanian leaders, who were in advanced stages of promoting national plans of their own. The Lithuanians were mostly interested only in a state "within ethnographic frontiers," as they perceived it.

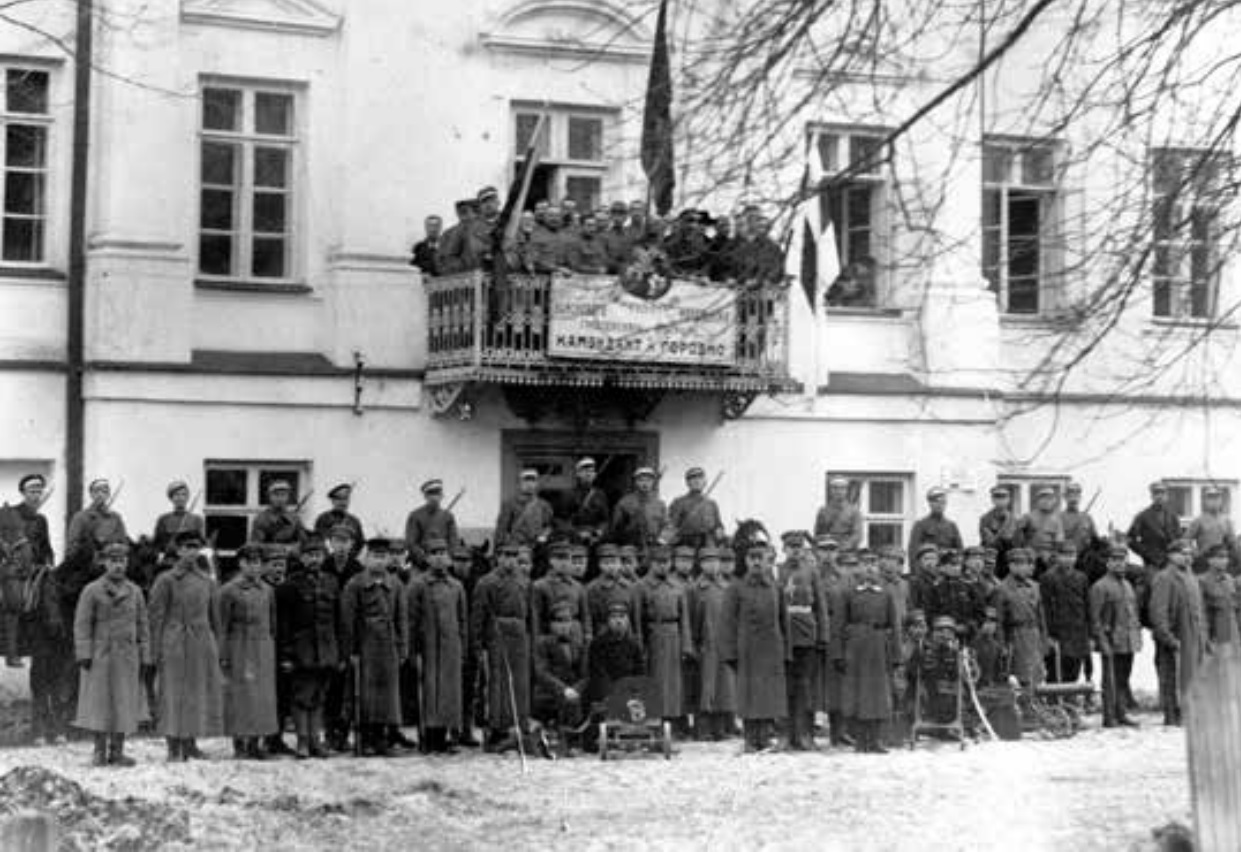
Grodno Military Command, loyal to Lithuania, decorated with three flags of Lithuania, Belarus, and with the Coat of arms of Lithuania, January 1919

Nevertheless, a Belarusian unit named 1st Belarusian Regiment (1-asis baltgudžių pėstininkų pulkas), commanded by Alaksandar Ružancoŭ, was formed mainly from Grodno's inhabitants in 1919 within the Lithuanian Armed Forces, which later also participated in supporting the Independence of Lithuania during the Lithuanian Wars of Independence, therefore many members of this unit were awarded with the highest state award of Lithuania – Order of the Cross of Vytis. Moreover, a Lithuanian Ministry for Belarusian Affairs (Gudų reikalų ministerija) was established within the Government of Lithuania, which functioned in 1918–1924, and was led by the ethnic Belarusian ministers such as Jazep Varonka, Dominik Semashko. The ethnic Belarusians were also included into the Council of Lithuania, and the Belarusian political leaders initially requested for a political autonomy of the Belarusian lands with the Belarusian language as the official language in them within the restored Lithuania before losing all control over the Belarusian territories to the Poles and Soviets.

In spite of its success in knocking Russia out of World War I by the terms of the Treaty of Brest-Litovsk early in 1918, Germany lost the war and signed the Armistice of Compiègne on 11 November 1918. Lithuanians quickly formed their first government, adopted a provisional constitution, and started organizing basic administrative structures. The prime minister of the new government was Augustinas Voldemaras. As the German army was withdrawing from the Eastern Front of World War I, it was followed by Soviet forces whose intention was to spread the global proletarian revolution. They created a number of puppet states, including the Lithuanian Soviet Socialist Republic on 16 December 1918. By the end of December, the Red Army reached Lithuanian borders and started the Lithuanian–Soviet War.

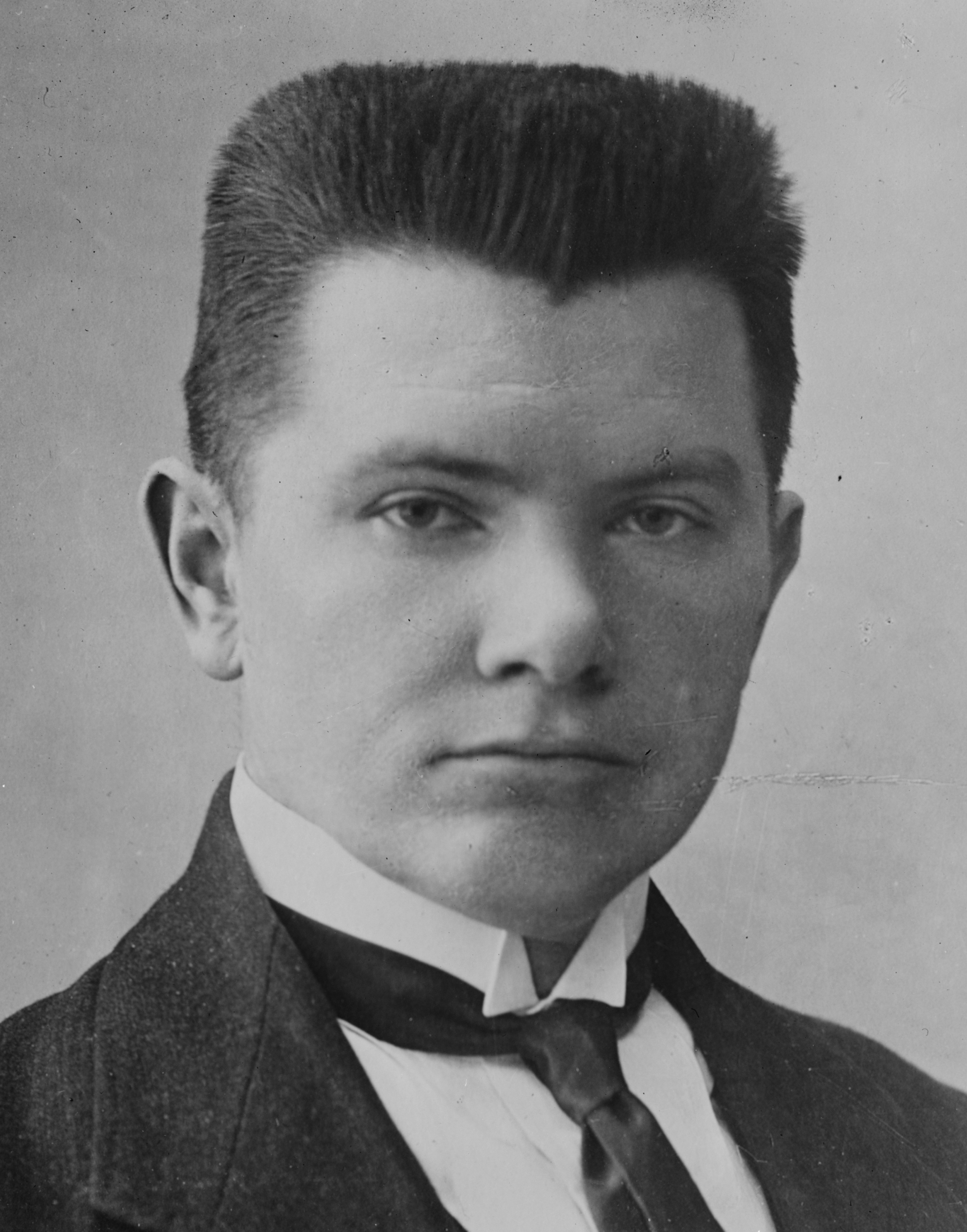
Augustinas Voldemaras, Lithuania's first prime minister

On 1 January 1919, the German occupying army withdrew from Vilnius and turned the city over to local Polish self-defense forces. The Lithuanian government evacuated Vilnius and moved west to Kaunas, which became the temporary capital of Lithuania. Vilnius was captured by the Soviet Red Army on 5 January 1919. As the Lithuanian army was in its infant stages, the Soviet forces moved largely unopposed and by mid-January 1919 controlled about two-thirds of Lithuanian territory. Vilnius was now the capital of the Lithuanian Soviet Republic, and soon of the combined Lithuanian–Byelorussian Soviet Socialist Republic.

From April 1919, the Lithuanian–Soviet War dragged on parallel with the Polish–Soviet War. Polish troops captured Vilnius from the Soviets on 21 April 1919. Poland had territorial claims over Lithuania, especially the Vilnius Region, and these tensions spilled over into the Polish–Lithuanian War. Józef Piłsudski of Poland, (Note: Piłsudski's family roots in the Polonized gentry of the Grand Duchy of Lithuania and the resulting point of view (seeing himself and people like him as legitimate Lithuanians) put him in conflict with the modern Lithuanian nationalists (who in Piłsudski's lifetime redefined the scope of the "Lithuanian" connotation), by extension with other nationalists, and also with the Polish modern nationalist movement.) seeking a Polish-Lithuanian federation, but unable to find common ground with Lithuanian politicians, in August 1919 made an unsuccessful attempt to overthrow the Lithuanian government in Kaunas. According to a 1924 publication of Lithuanian President Antanas Smetona, following a successful recapture of the Lithuanian capital Vilnius from Poland, the Lithuanians planned to expand further into the Belarusian territories (the former lands of the Grand Duchy of Lithuania) and considered granting an autonomy to the Belarusian territories, as requested by the Belarusian side, therefore had kept the Lithuanian Ministry for Belarusian Affairs in force, moreover, Smetona noted that there were a lot of pro-Lithuanian sympathies among the Belarusians.

The Belarusian unit of the Lithuanian Armed Forces in Grodno was disbanded by the Poles following the annexation of it by the Polish Armed Forces in April 1919, while the soldiers of this unit were disarmed, looted, and publicly humiliated by the Polish soldiers, who even ripped off the Belarusian officers insignias from their uniforms and trampled these symbols with their feet in public, as documented in the historical documents sent by the Belarusians to the temporary Lithuanian capital Kaunas because this unit refused to carry out the Polish orders and stayed loyal to Lithuania. Following the annexation of Grodno, the Lithuanian yellow–green–red, Belarusian white–red–white flags, and signs with the Coat of arms of Lithuania were torn off and the Polish gendarmes dragged them on the dusty streets for ridicule; instead of them, the Polish signs and flags were raised in their place everywhere in the city. Soldiers and Catholic officers of the Belarusian regiment in Grodno were offered to join the Polish Army, while those who refused were offered to leave or were arrested, put into the concentration camps or deported from the native land by the Poles, part of the Belarusian soldiers and officers of this regiment evacuated to Kaunas and continued serving for Lithuania.

The Lithuanian Army, commanded by General Silvestras Žukauskas, withstood Red Army advance near Kėdainiai and in the spring of 1919 the Lithuanians recaptured Šiauliai, Radviliškis, Panevėžys, Ukmergė. By the end of August 1919, the Soviets were pushed out of Lithuanian territory and the Lithuanian units reached Daugava. The Lithuanian Army was then deployed against the paramilitary West Russian Volunteer Army (Bermontians), who invaded northern Lithuania. There were around 50,000 of Bermontians and they were well armed by Germany and supported German and Russian soldiers who sought to retain German control over the former Ober Ost. West Russian Volunteers were defeated and pushed out by the end of 1919. Thus the first phase of the Lithuanian Wars of Independence was over and Lithuanians could direct attention to internal affairs.

=== Democratic period ===
The Constituent Assembly of Lithuania was elected in April 1920 and first met the following May. In June it adopted the third provisional constitution and on 12 July 1920, signed the Soviet–Lithuanian Peace Treaty. In the treaty the Soviet Union recognized fully independent Lithuania and its claims to the disputed Vilnius Region; Lithuania secretly allowed the Soviet forces passage through its territory as they moved against Poland. On 14 July 1920, the advancing Soviet army captured Vilnius for a second time from Polish forces. The city was handed back to Lithuanians on 26 August 1920, following the defeat of the Soviet offensive. The victorious Polish army returned and the Soviet–Lithuanian Treaty increased hostilities between Poland and Lithuania. To prevent further fighting, the Suwałki Agreement was signed with Poland on 7 October 1920; it left Vilnius on the Lithuanian side of the armistice line. It never went into effect, however, because Polish General Lucjan Żeligowski, acting on Józef Piłsudski's orders, staged the Żeligowski's Mutiny, a military action presented as a mutiny. He invaded Lithuania on 8 October 1920, captured Vilnius the following day, and established a short-lived Republic of Central Lithuania in eastern Lithuania on 12 October 1920. The republic was a part of Piłsudski's federalist scheme, which never materialized due to opposition from both Polish and Lithuanian nationalists.

Demarcation lines between Poland and Lithuania 1919–1939

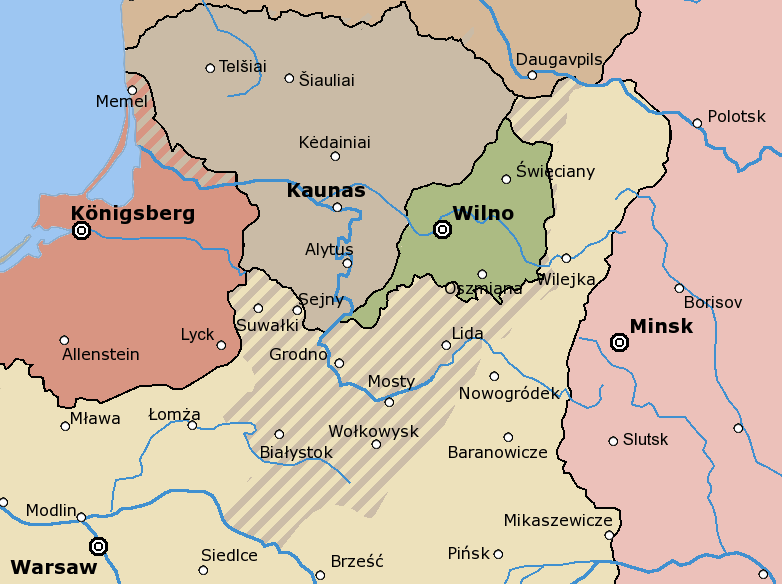
Lithuanian–Polish territorial disputes in the early 1920s, including the Republic of Central Lithuania.

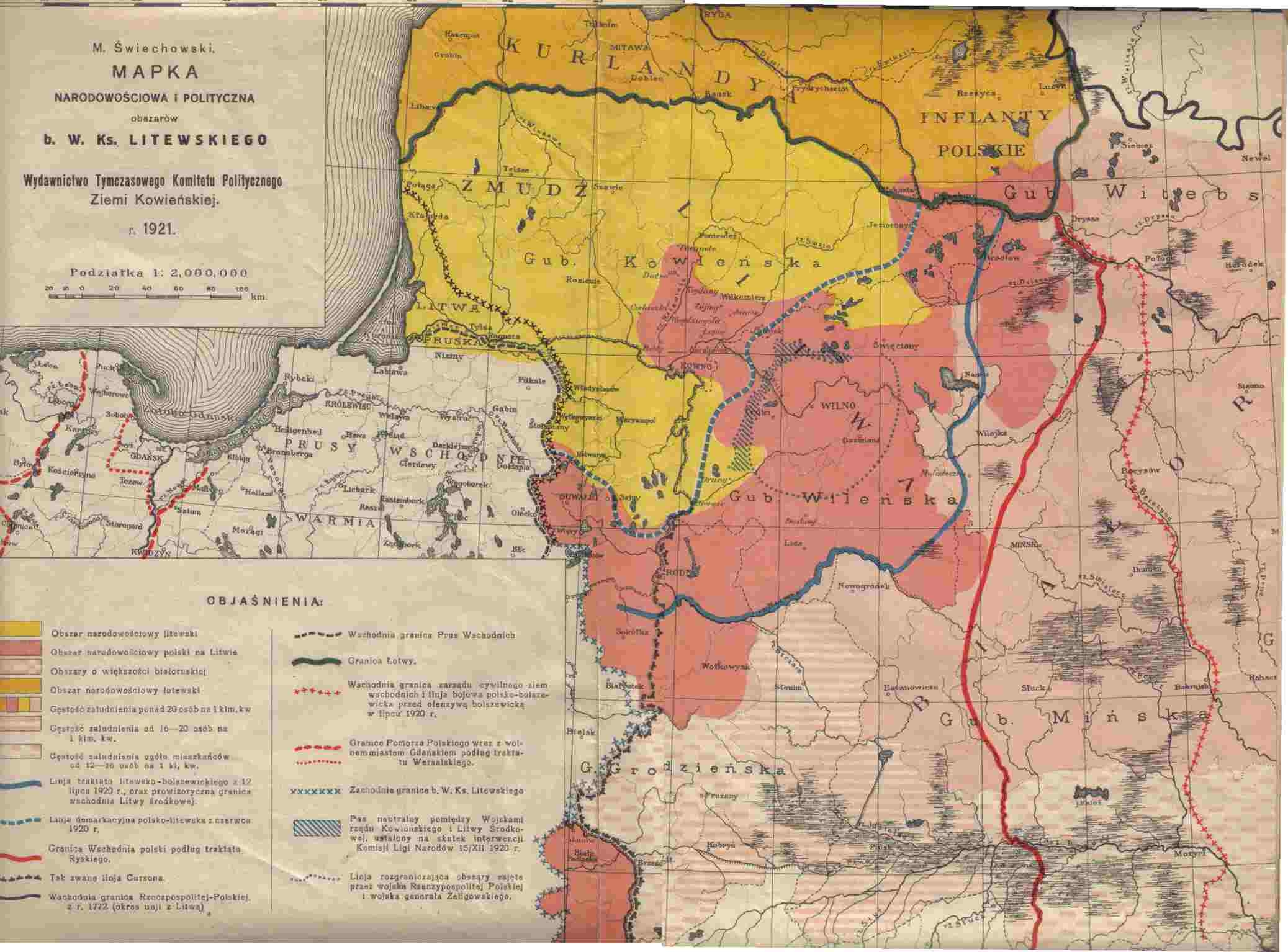
TKPZK (which argued for Polish annexation of Lithuania) propaganda map in 1921, claiming to show the ethnic makeup of the western lands of the former Grand Duchy of Lithuania. Red is supposed to mean Poles in Lithuania, and yellow – Lithuanians.

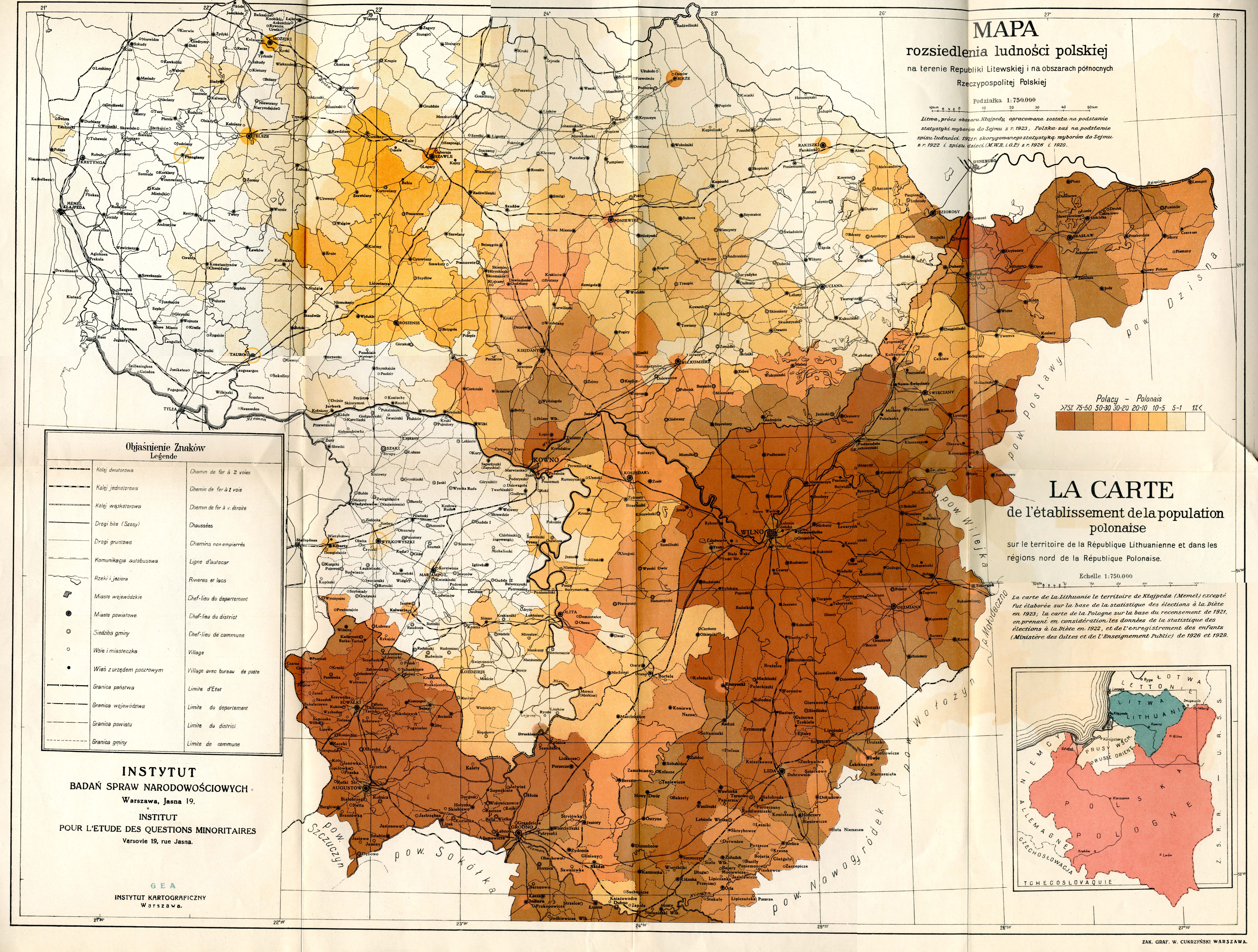
Propaganda map of a Polish government's institute from 1929, claiming to show the number of Poles in Lithuania, extrapolated from the elections to the Lithuanian Seimas in 1923, the Polish Sejm in 1922 and censuses in 1921.

For 19 years, Kaunas was the temporary capital of Lithuania while the Vilnius region remained under Polish administration. The League of Nations attempted to mediate the dispute, and Paul Hymans proposed plans for a Polish–Lithuanian union, but negotiations broke down as neither side could agree to a compromise. Central Lithuania held a general election in 1922 that was boycotted by the Jews, Lithuanians and Belarusians, then was annexed into Poland on 24 March 1922. The Conference of Ambassadors awarded Vilnius to Poland in March 1923. Lithuania did not accept this decision and broke all relations with Poland. The two countries were officially at war over Vilnius, the historical capital of Lithuania, inhabited at that time largely by Polish-speaking and Jewish populations between 1920 and 1938. The dispute continued to dominate Lithuanian domestic politics and foreign policy and doomed the relations with Poland for the entire interwar period.

For administrative purposes, the de facto territory of the country was divided into 23 counties (lt:apskritis). A further 11 counties (including Vilnius) were allocated for the territory occupied by Poland (see also Administrative divisions of Lithuania).

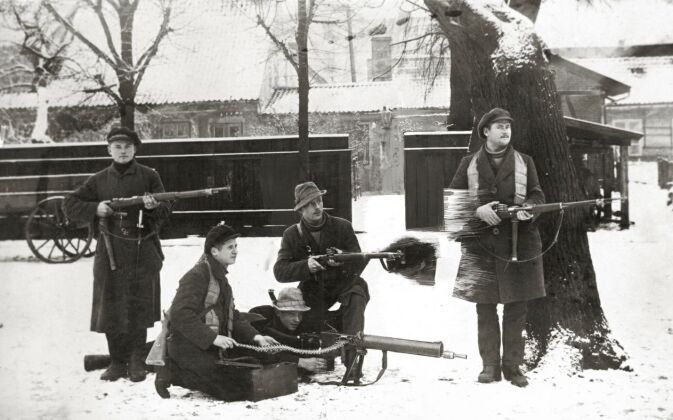
Lithuanian rebels during the Klaipėda Revolt

The Constituent Assembly, which adjourned in October 1920 due to threats from Poland, gathered again and initiated many reforms needed in the new state. Lithuania obtained international recognition and membership in the League of Nations, (Note: The main western powers recognized Lithuania only in 1922, when, after the Treaty of Riga, it had become clear that the Polish–Lithuanian Commonwealth was not going to be reestablished.) passed a law for land reform, introduced a national currency (the litas), and adopted a final constitution in August 1922. Lithuania became a democratic state, with Seimas (parliament) elected by men and women for a three-year term. The Seimas elected the president. The First Seimas of Lithuania was elected in October 1922, but could not form a government as the votes split equally 38–38, and it was forced to dissolve. Its only lasting achievement was the Klaipėda Revolt from 10 January to 15 January 1923. The revolt involved Lithuania Minor, a region traditionally sought by Lithuanian nationalists that remained under German rule after World War I, except for the Klaipėda Region with its large Lithuanian minority. (Various sources give the region's interwar ethnic composition as 41.9 percent German, 27.1 percent Memelländisch, and 26.6 percent Lithuanian.)

Lithuania took advantage of the Ruhr Crisis in western Europe and captured the Klaipėda Region, a territory detached from East Prussia by the terms of the Treaty of Versailles and placed under a French administration sponsored by the League of Nations. The region was incorporated as an autonomous district of Lithuania in May 1924. For Lithuania, it provided the country's only access to the Baltic Sea, and it was an important industrial center, but the region's numerous German inhabitants resisted Lithuanian rule during the 1930s. The Klaipėda Revolt was the last armed conflict in Lithuania before World War II.

The Second Seimas of Lithuania, elected in May 1923, was the only Seimas in independent Lithuania that served its full term. The Seimas continued the land reform, introduced social support systems, and started repaying foreign debt. The first Lithuanian national census took place in 1923.

=== Authoritarian period ===
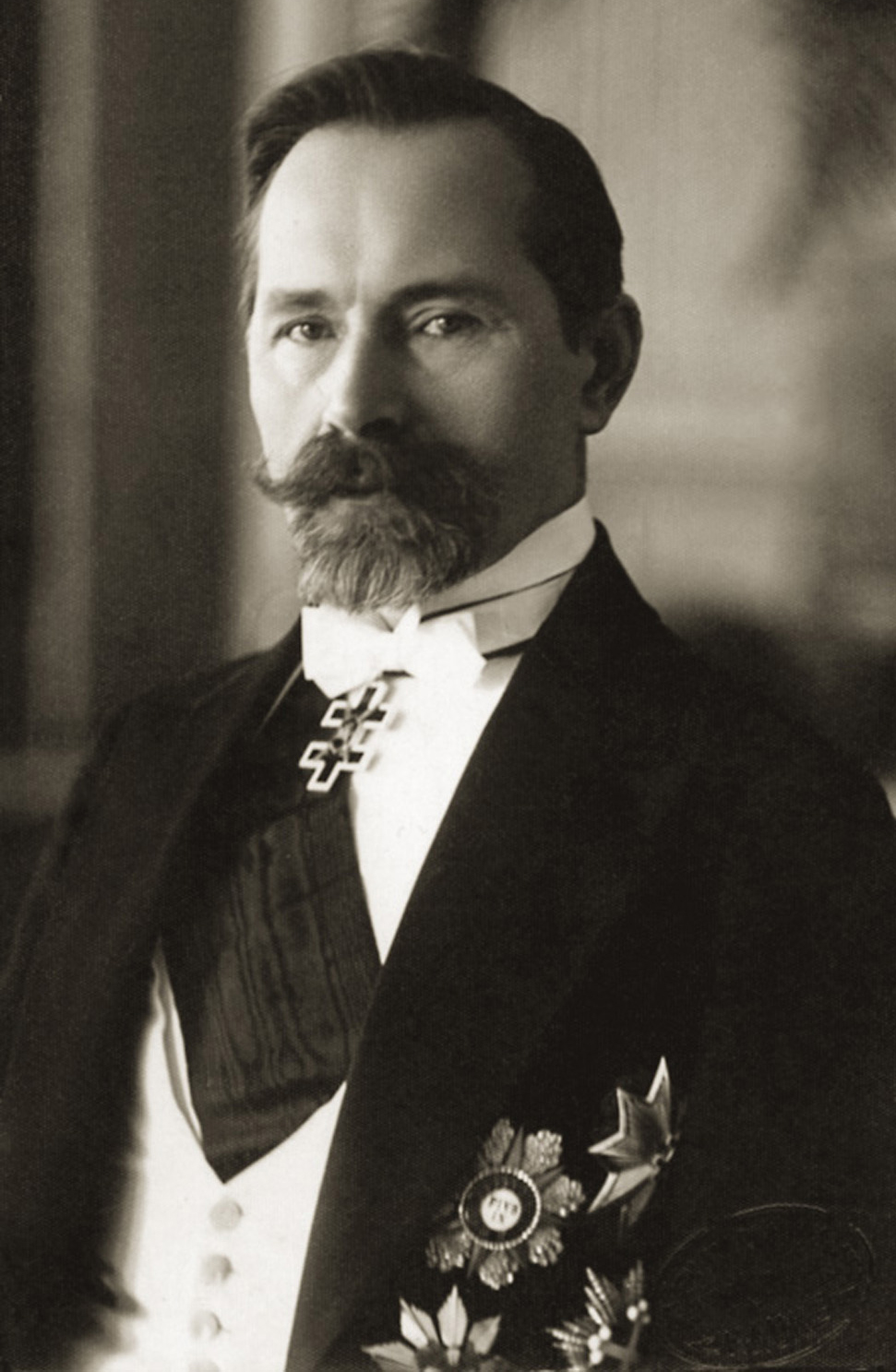
Antanas Smetona, the first and last president of independent Lithuania during the interbellum years. The 1918–1939 period is often known as "Smetona's time".

The Third Seimas of Lithuania was elected in May 1926. For the first time, the bloc led by the Lithuanian Christian Democratic Party lost their majority and went into opposition. It was sharply criticized for signing the Soviet–Lithuanian Non-Aggression Pact (even though it affirmed Soviet recognition of Lithuanian claims to Poland-held Vilnius) and was accused of "Bolshevizing" Lithuania. As a result of growing tensions, the government was deposed during the 1926 Lithuanian coup d'état in December. The coup, organized by the military, was supported by the Lithuanian Nationalists Union (tautininkai) and Lithuanian Christian Democrats. They installed Antanas Smetona as the president and Augustinas Voldemaras as the prime minister. Smetona suppressed the opposition and remained as an authoritarian leader until June 1940.

The Seimas thought that the coup was just a temporary measure and that new elections would be called to return Lithuania to democracy. Instead, the legislative body was dissolved in May 1927. Later that year members of the Social Democrats and other leftist parties tried to organize an uprising against Smetona, but were quickly subdued. Voldemaras grew increasingly independent of Smetona and was forced to resign in 1929. Three times in 1930 and once in 1934, he unsuccessfully attempted to return to power. In May 1928, Smetona announced the fifth provisional constitution without consulting the Seimas. The constitution continued to claim that Lithuania was a democratic state while the powers of the president were vastly increased. Smetona's party, the Lithuanian Nationalist Union, steadily grew in size and importance. He adopted the title "tautos vadas" (leader of the nation) and slowly started building a cult of personality. Many prominent political figures married into Smetona's family (for example, Juozas Tūbelis and Stasys Raštikis).

When the Nazi Party came into power in Germany, German–Lithuanian relations worsened considerably as the Nazis did not want to accept the loss of the Klaipėda Region (German: Memelland). The Nazis sponsored anti-Lithuanian organizations in the region. In 1934, Lithuania put the activists on trial and sentenced about 100 people, including their leaders Ernst Neumann and Theodor von Sass, to prison terms. That prompted Germany, one of the main trade partners of Lithuania, to declare an embargo of Lithuanian products. In response, Lithuania shifted its exports to the United Kingdom. That measure did not go far enough to satisfy many groups, and peasants in Suvalkija organized strikes, which were violently suppressed. Smetona's prestige was damaged, and in September 1936, he agreed to call the first elections for the Seimas since the coup of 1926. Before the elections, all political parties were eliminated except for the National Union. Thus 42 of the 49 members of the Fourth Seimas of Lithuania were from the National Union. This assembly functioned as an advisory board to the president, and in February 1938, it adopted a new constitution that granted the president even greater powers.

As tensions were rising in Europe following the annexation of the Federal State of Austria by Nazi Germany (the Anschluss), Poland presented the 1938 Polish ultimatum to Lithuania in March of that year. Poland demanded the re-establishment of the normal diplomatic relations that were broken after the Żeligowski Mutiny in 1920 and threatened military actions in case of refusal. Lithuania, having a weaker military and unable to enlist international support for its cause, accepted the ultimatum. In the event of Polish military action, Adolf Hitler ordered a German military takeover of southwest Lithuania up to the Dubysa River, and his armed forces were being fully mobilized until the news of the Lithuanian acceptance. Relations between Poland and Lithuania became somewhat normalized after the acceptance of the ultimatum, and the parties concluded treaties regarding railway transport, postal exchange, and other means of communication.

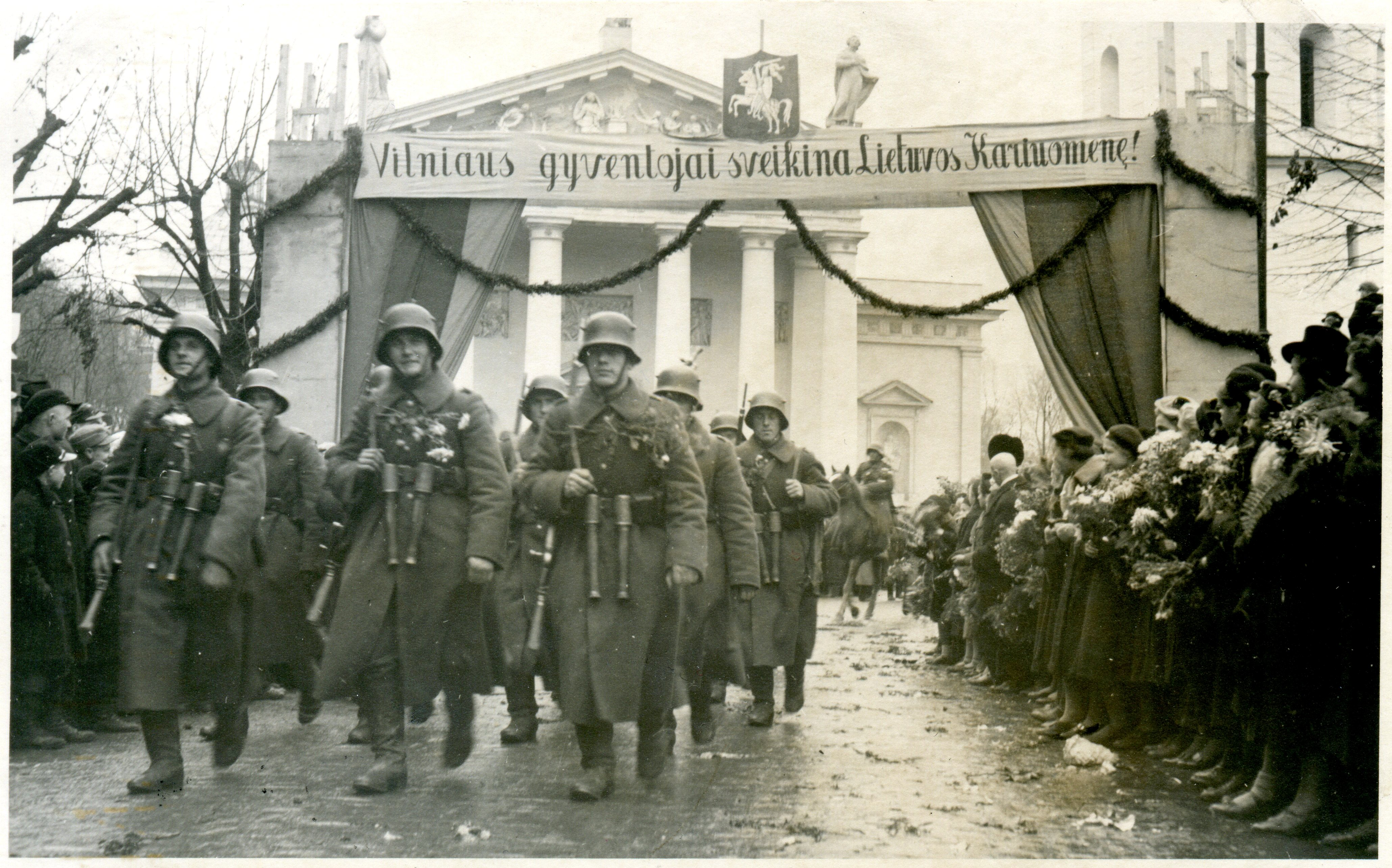
Parade of the Lithuanian Army in Vilnius (1939)

Lithuania offered diplomatic support to Germany and the Soviet Union in opposition to powers such as France and Estonia that backed Poland in the conflict over Vilnius, but both Germany and the Soviet Union saw fit to encroach on Lithuania's territory and independence anyway. Following the Nazi electoral success in Klaipėda in December 1938, Germany decided to take action to secure control of the entire region. On 20 March 1939, just a few days after the German occupation of Czechoslovakia of 15 March, Lithuania received the 1939 German ultimatum to Lithuania from foreign minister Joachim von Ribbentrop. It demanded the immediate cession of the Klaipėda Region to Germany. The Lithuanian government accepted the ultimatum to avoid an armed intervention. The Klaipėda Region was directly incorporated into the Gau East Prussia of the German Reich. This triggered a political crisis in Lithuania and forced Smetona to form a new government that included members of the opposition for the first time since 1926. The loss of Klaipėda was a major blow to the Lithuanian economy and the country shifted into the sphere of German influence.

Adolf Hitler initially planned to transform Lithuania into a satellite state which would participate in its planned military conquests in exchange for territorial enlargements. When Germany and the Soviet Union concluded the Molotov–Ribbentrop Pact in August 1939 and divided Eastern Europe into spheres of influence, Lithuania was assigned to Germany at first, but that changed after Smetona's refusal to participate in the German invasion of Poland. Joseph Stalin agreed to cede Polish areas initially annexed by the Soviet Union to the Greater Germanic Reich in exchange for Lithuania entering the Soviet sphere of influence.

Lithuanian territorial issues 1939–1940

The interwar period of independence gave birth to the development of Lithuanian press, literature, music, arts, and theater as well as a comprehensive system of education with Lithuanian as the language of instruction. The network of primary and secondary schools was expanded and institutions of higher learning were established in Kaunas. Lithuanian society remained heavily agricultural with only 20% of the people living in cities. The influence of the Catholic Church was strong and birth rates high: the population increased by 22% to over three million during 1923–1939, despite emigration to South America and elsewhere. In almost all cities and towns, traditionally dominated by Jews, Poles, Russians and Germans, ethnic Lithuanians became the majority. Lithuanians, for example, constituted 59% of the residents of Kaunas in 1923, as opposed to 7% in 1897. The right-wing dictatorship of 1926–1940 had strangely stabilizing social effects, as it prevented the worst of antisemitic excesses as well as the rise of leftist and rightist political extremism.

== World War II (1939–1945) ==
=== First Soviet occupation ===
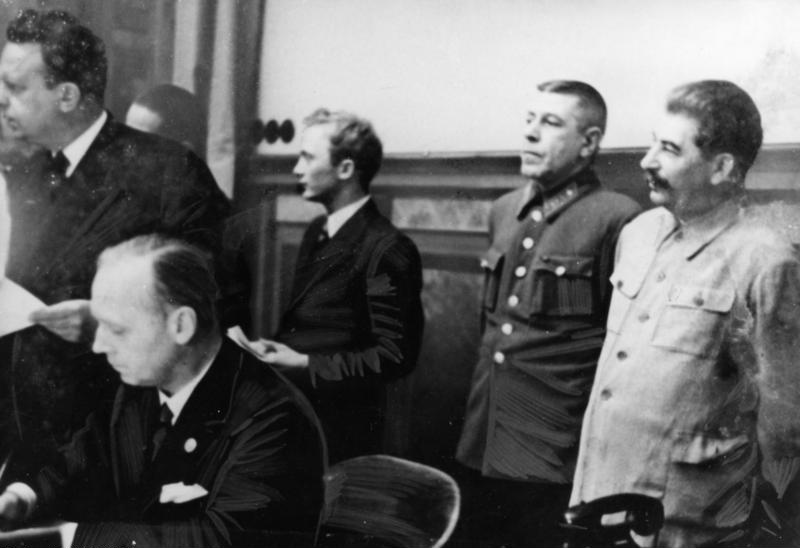
Joseph Stalin, Joachim von Ribbentrop and others at the signing of the German–Soviet Boundary and Friendship Treaty

Secret protocols of the Molotov–Ribbentrop Pact, adjusted by the German-Soviet Frontier Treaty, divided Eastern Europe into Soviet and Nazi spheres of influence. The three Baltic states fell to the Soviet sphere. During the subsequent invasion of Poland, the Red Army captured Vilnius, regarded by Lithuanians as their capital. According to the Soviet–Lithuanian Mutual Assistance Pact of 10 October 1939, Soviet Union transferred Vilnius and surrounding territory to Lithuania in exchange for the stationing of 20,000 Soviet troops within the country. It was a virtual sacrifice of independence, as reflected in a known slogan "Vilnius – mūsų, Lietuva – rusų" (Vilnius is ours, but Lithuania is Russia's). Similar Mutual Assistance Pacts were signed with Latvia and Estonia. When Finland refused to sign its pact, the Winter War broke out.

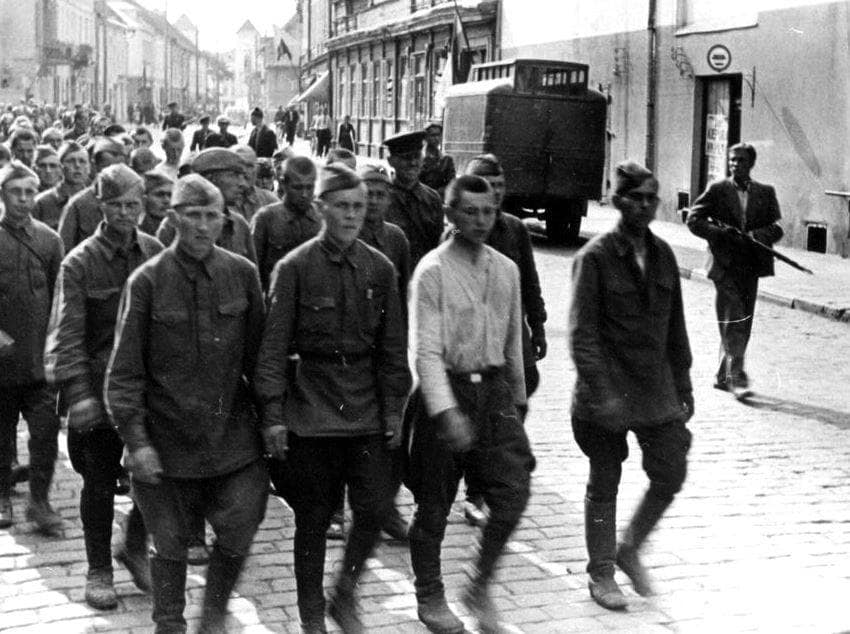
Lithuanian resistance fighters, commanded by the Provisional Government, lead the disarmed soldiers of the Red Army in Kaunas during the June Uprising in 1941

In spring 1940, once the Winter War in Finland was over, the Soviets heightened their diplomatic pressure on Lithuania and issued the 1940 Soviet ultimatum to Lithuania on June 14. The ultimatum demanded the formation of a new pro-Soviet government and admission of an unspecified number of Red Army troops. With Soviet troops already stationed within the country, Lithuania could not resist and accepted the ultimatum. President Antanas Smetona fled Lithuania as 150,000 Soviet troops crossed the Lithuanian border. Soviet representative Vladimir Dekanozov formed the new pro-Soviet puppet government, known as the People's Government, headed by Justas Paleckis, and organized show elections for the so-called People's Seimas. During its first session on July 21, the People's Seimas unanimously voted to convert Lithuania into the Lithuanian Soviet Socialist Republic and petitioned to join the Soviet Union. The application was approved by the Supreme Soviet of the Soviet Union on 3 August 1940, which completed the formalization of the annexation.

Immediately following the occupation, Soviet authorities began rapid Sovietization of Lithuania. All land was nationalized. To gain support for the new regime among the poorer peasants, large farms were distributed to small landowners. However, in preparation for eventual collectivization, agricultural taxes were dramatically increased in an attempt to bankrupt all farmers. Nationalization of banks, larger enterprises, and real estate resulted in disruptions in production that caused massive shortages of goods. The Lithuanian litas was artificially undervalued and withdrawn by spring 1941. Standards of living plummeted. All religious, cultural, and political organizations were banned, leaving only the Communist Party of Lithuania and its youth branch. An estimated 12,000 "enemies of the people" were arrested. During the June deportation campaign of 1941, some 12,600 people (mostly former military officers, policemen, political figures, intelligentsia and their families) were deported to Gulags in Siberia under the policy of elimination of national elites. Many deportees perished due to inhumane conditions; 3,600 were imprisoned and over 1,000 were killed.

=== Occupation of Lithuania by Nazi Germany (1941–1944) ===
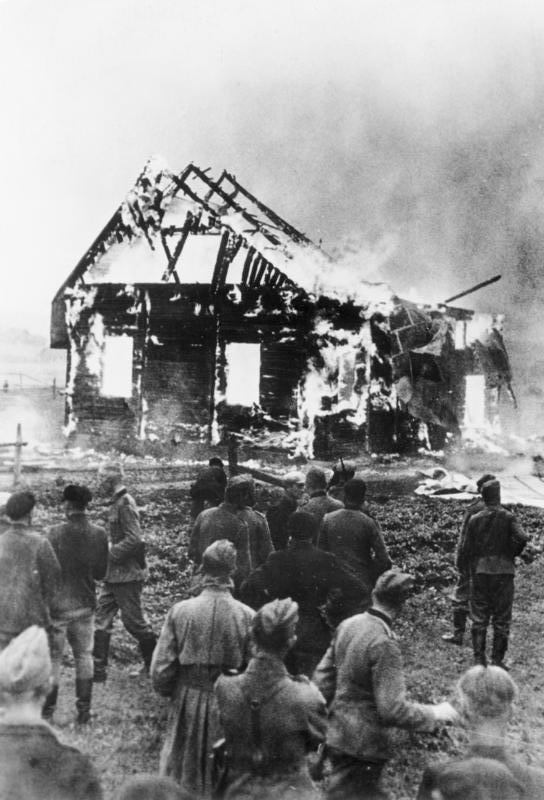
German soldiers and locals watch a Lithuanian synagogue burn in 1941.

On 22 June 1941, Nazi Germany invaded the Soviet Union in Operation Barbarossa. In Franz Walter Stahlecker's report of October 15 to Heinrich Himmler, Stahlecker wrote that he had succeeded in covering up actions of the Vorkommando (German vanguard unit) and made it look like an initiative of the local population to carry out the Kaunas pogrom. The German forces moved rapidly and encountered only sporadic Soviet resistance. Vilnius was captured on 24 June 1941, and Germany controlled all of Lithuania within a week. The retreating Soviet forces murdered between 1,000 and 1,500 people, mostly ethnic Lithuanians (see Rainiai massacre). The Lithuanians generally greeted the Germans as liberators from the oppressive Soviet regime and hoped that Germany would restore some autonomy to their country. The Lithuanian Activist Front organized an anti-Soviet revolt known as the June Uprising in Lithuania, declared independence, and formed a Provisional Government of Lithuania with Juozas Ambrazevičius as prime minister. The Provisional Government was not forcibly dissolved; stripped by the Germans of any actual power, it resigned on 5 August 1941. Germany established the civil administration known as the Reichskommissariat Ostland.

Initially, there was substantial cooperation and collaboration between the German forces and some Lithuanians. Lithuanians joined the TDA Battalions and Auxiliary police battalions in hopes that these police units would be later transformed into the regular army of independent Lithuania. Instead, some units were employed by the Germans as auxiliaries in perpetrating the Holocaust. However, soon Lithuanians became disillusioned with harsh German policies of collecting large war provisions, gathering people for forced labor in Germany, conscripting men into the Wehrmacht, and the lack of true autonomy. These feelings naturally led to the creation of a resistance movement. The most notable resistance organization, the Supreme Committee for the Liberation of Lithuania, was formed in 1943. Due to passive resistance, a Waffen-SS division was not established in Lithuania. As a compromise, the Lithuanian general Povilas Plechavičius formed the short-lived Lithuanian Territorial Defense Force (LTDF). Lithuanians did not organize armed resistance, still considering the Soviet Union their primary enemy. Armed resistance was conducted by pro-Soviet partisans (mainly Russians, Belarusians and Jews) and Polish Armia Krajowa (AK) in eastern Lithuania.

Before the Holocaust, Lithuania was home to a disputed number of Jews: 210,000 according to one estimate, 250,000 according to another. About 90% or more of the Lithuanian Jews were murdered, one of the highest rates in Europe. The Holocaust in Lithuania can be divided into three stages: mass executions (June–December 1941), a ghetto period (1942 – March 1943), and a final liquidation (April 1943 – July 1944). Unlike in other Nazi-occupied countries where the Holocaust was introduced gradually, Einsatzgruppe A started executions in Lithuania on the first days of the German occupation. The executions were carried out by the Nazis and their Lithuanian collaborators in three main areas: Kaunas (marked by the Ninth Fort), in Vilnius (marked by the Ponary massacre), and in the countryside (sponsored by the Rollkommando Hamann). An estimated 80% of Lithuanian Jews were killed before 1942. The surviving 43,000 Jews were concentrated in the Vilnius Ghetto, Kaunas Ghetto, Šiauliai Ghetto, and Švenčionys Ghetto and forced to work for the benefit of German military industry. In 1943, the ghettos were either liquidated or turned into concentration camps. Only about 2,000–3,000 Lithuanian Jews were liberated from these camps. More survived by withdrawing into the interior of Russia before the war broke out or by escaping the ghettos and joining the Jewish partisans.

=== Second Soviet occupation ===
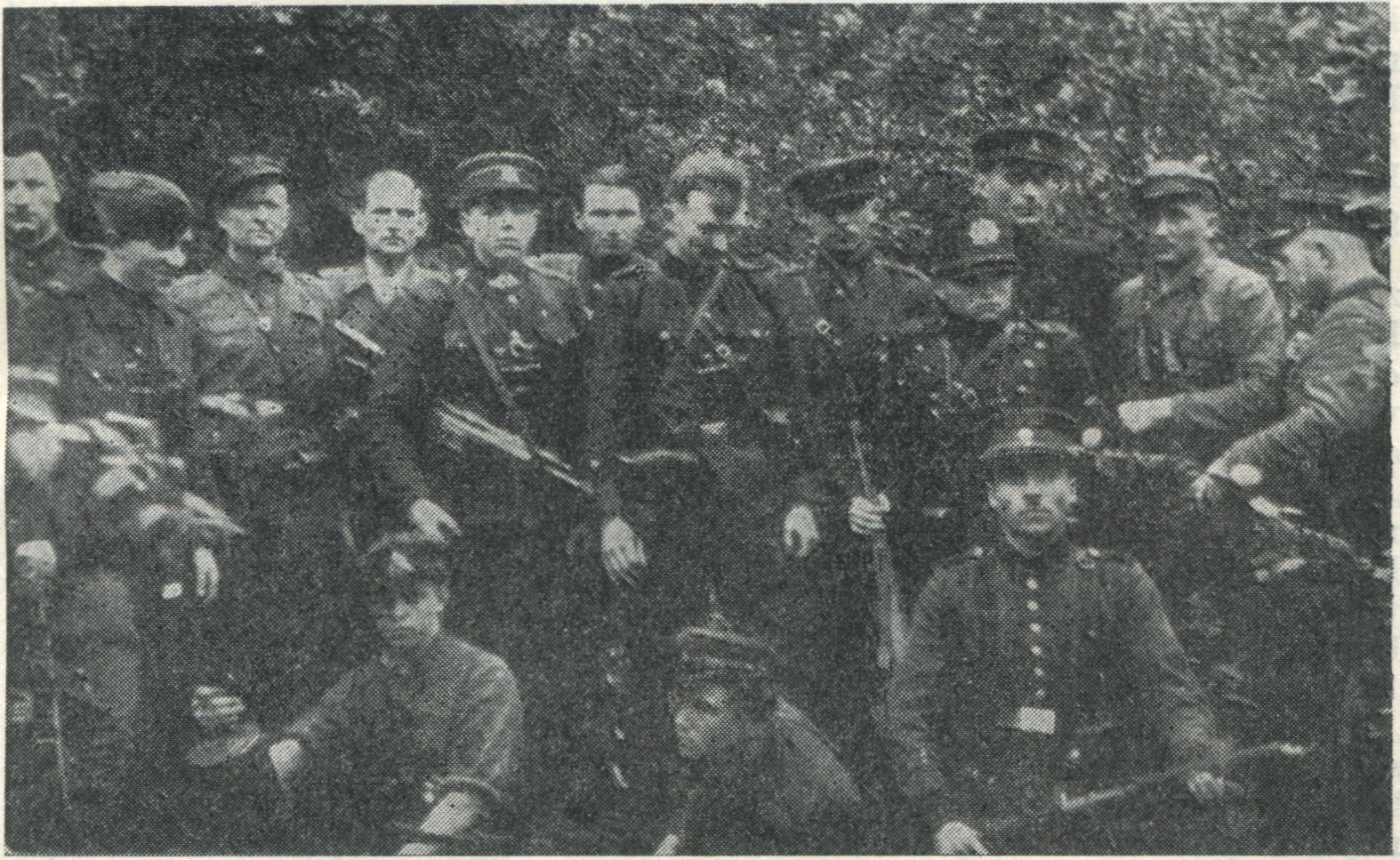
Lithuanian armed resistance against Soviet occupation lasted until 1953.

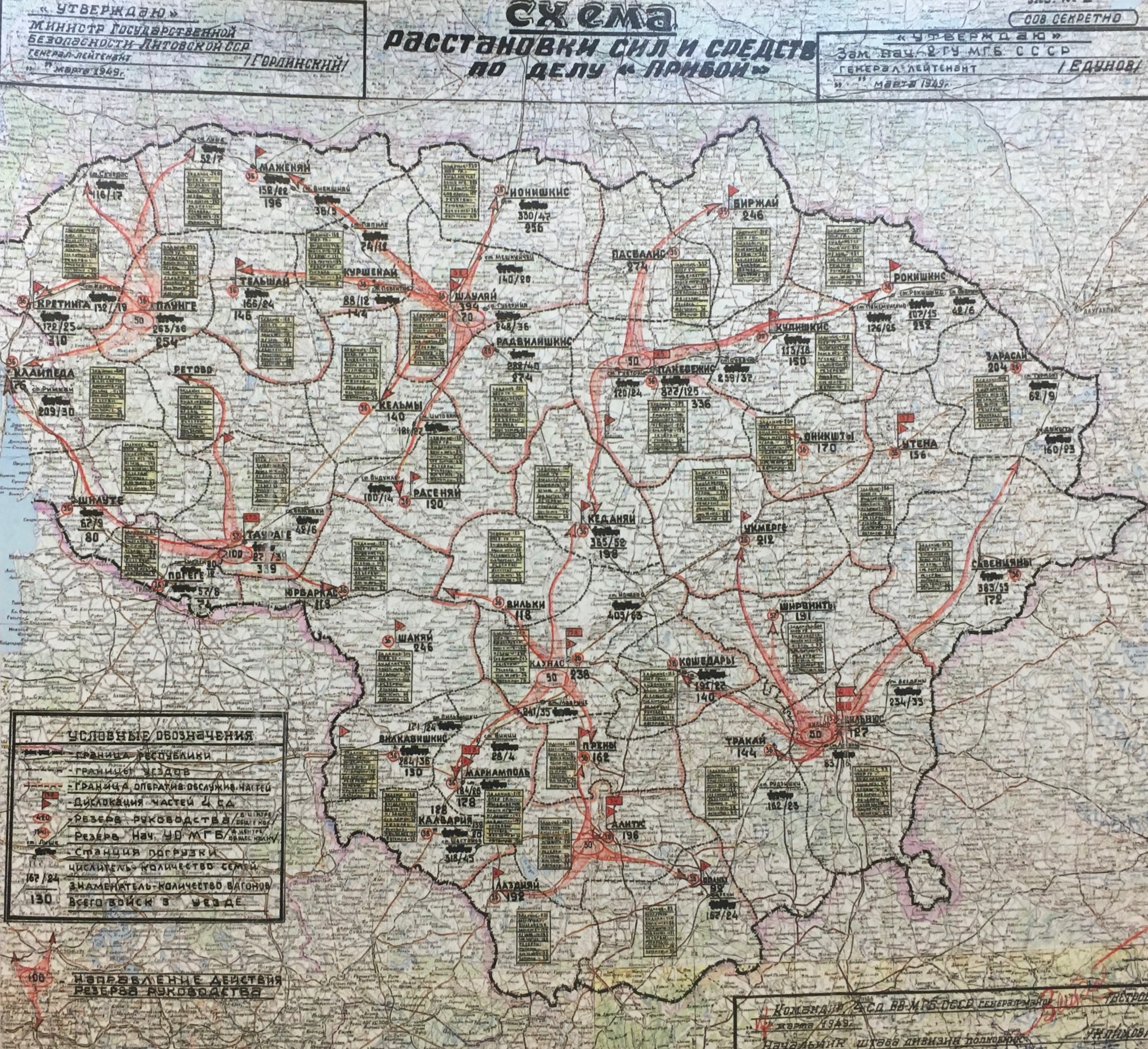
The plan of deportations of the civilian population in Lithuania during the Operation Priboi (1949) created by the Soviet MGB.

In the summer of 1944, the Soviet Red Army reached eastern Lithuania. By July 1944, the area around Vilnius came under control of the Polish Resistance fighters of the Armia Krajowa, who also attempted a takeover of the German-held city during the ill-fated Operation Ostra Brama. The Red Army captured Vilnius with Polish help on 13 July. The Soviet Union re-occupied Lithuania and Joseph Stalin re-established the Lithuanian Soviet Socialist Republic in 1944 with its capital in Vilnius. The Soviets secured the passive agreement of the United States and Great Britain (see Yalta Conference and Potsdam Agreement) to this annexation. By January 1945, the Soviet forces captured Klaipėda on the Baltic coast. The heaviest physical losses in Lithuania during World War II were suffered in 1944–1945, when the Red Army pushed out the Nazi invaders. It is estimated that Lithuania lost 780,000 people between 1940 and 1954 under the Nazi and Soviet occupations.

== Soviet period (1944–1990) ==
=== Stalinist terror and resistance (1944–1953) ===
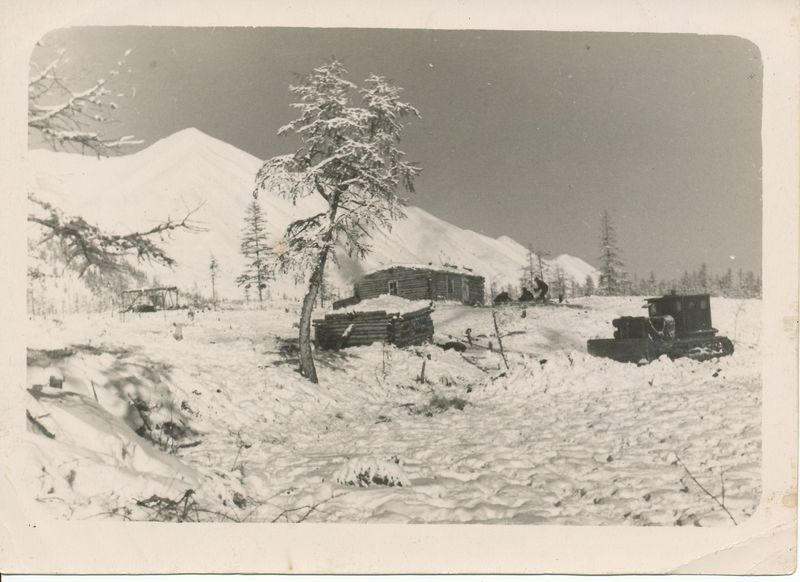
Lithuanian deportee house in Kolyma (1958).

The Soviet deportations from Lithuania between 1941 and 1952 resulted in the exile of thousands of families to forced settlements in the Soviet Union, especially in Siberia and other remote parts of the country. Between 1944 and 1953, nearly 120,000 people (5% of the population) were deported, and thousands more became political prisoners. Many leading intellectual figures and most Catholic priests were among the deported; many returned to Lithuania after 1953. Approximately 20,000 Lithuanian partisans participated in unsuccessful warfare against the Soviet regime in the 1940s and early 1950s. Most were killed or deported to Siberian gulags. (Note: It was a sizable force in comparison with the similar number (20,000) of underground anti-communist fighters operating at that time in Poland. Poland was a country with an over eight times the population of Lithuania, but legal opposition (the Polish People's Party) was primarily active there in the 1940s.) During the years following the German surrender at the end of World War II in 1945, between 40 and 60 thousand civilians and combatants perished in the context of the anti-Soviet insurgency. Considerably more ethnic Lithuanians died after World War II than during it.

Lithuanian armed resistance lasted until 1953. Adolfas Ramanauskas (code name 'Vanagas', translated to English: the hawk), the last official commander of the Union of Lithuanian Freedom Fighters, was arrested in October 1956 and executed in November 1957.

=== Soviet era (1953–1988) ===
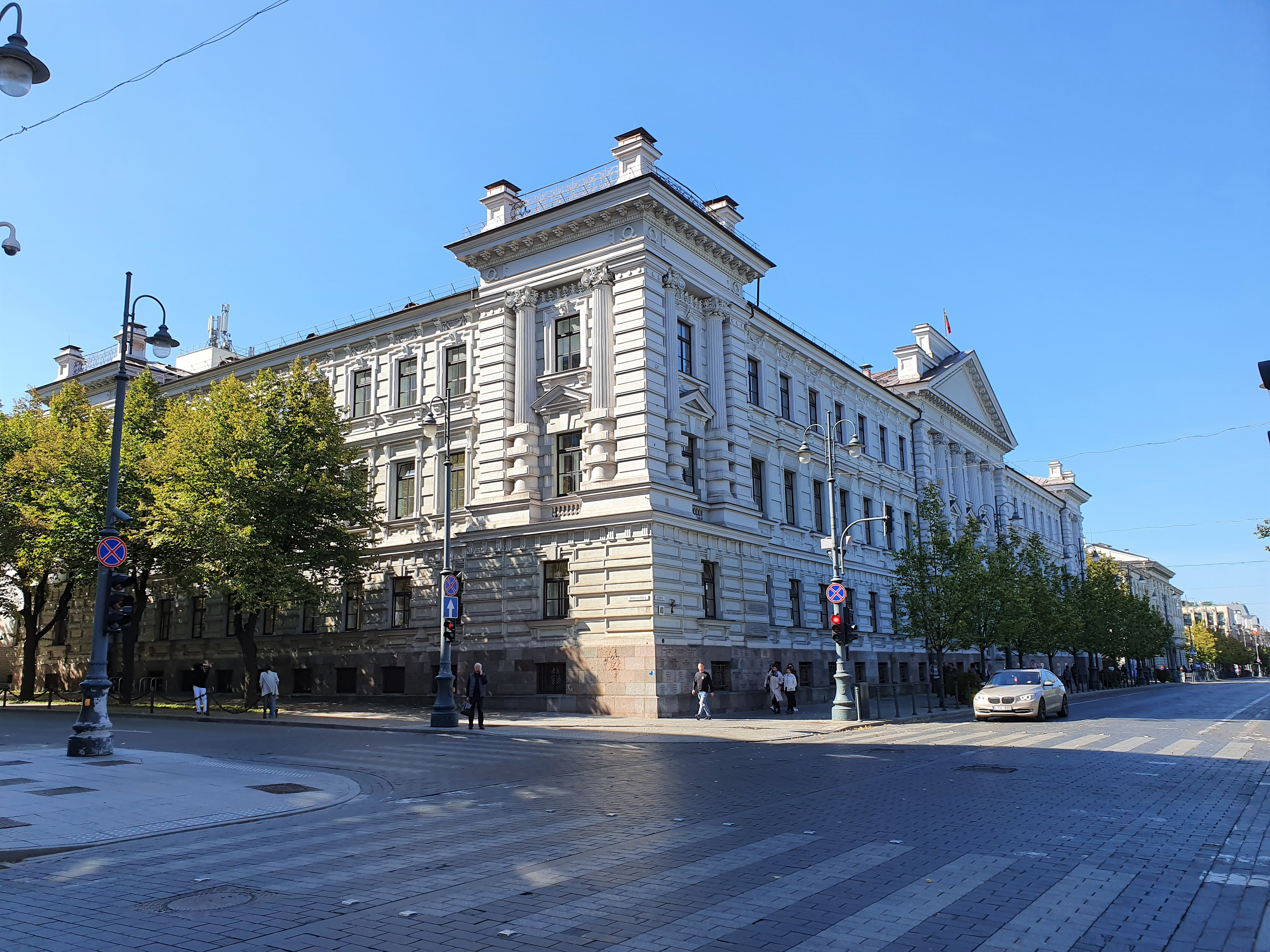
Former KGB headquarters in Vilnius, containing the Museum of Occupations and Freedom Fights.

Soviet authorities encouraged the immigration of non-Lithuanian workers, especially Russians, as a way of integrating Lithuania into the Soviet Union and encouraging industrial development, but in Lithuania this process did not assume the massive scale experienced by other European Soviet republics.

To a great extent, Lithuanization rather than Russification took place in postwar Vilnius and elements of a national revival characterize the period of Lithuania's existence as a Soviet republic. (Note: About 90% of Vilnius Jews had been exterminated by the Nazis in 1941–1944 and about 80% of Vilnius Poles were deported under the Soviet rule in 1944–1946, which left the city open to settlement by Lithuanians, or possibly Russians.) Lithuania's boundaries and political integrity were determined by Joseph Stalin's decision to grant Vilnius to the Lithuanian SSR again in 1944. Subsequently, most Poles were resettled from Vilnius (but only a minority from the countryside and other parts of the Lithuanian SSR) (Note: The preservation of the rural Polish-speaking minority in the Vilnius Region (the intelligentsia element was mostly expelled after the war) turned out to be a source of lasting friction. After 1950 Stalin, playing on the Lithuanian against the Polish insecurities, allowed the formation of a network of Polish, communist ideology-preaching schools. This Soviet policy continued also after 1956, despite Lithuanian objections. The Polish community reacted with fear to the rebirth of assertive Lithuanian nationalism after 1988 and attempted to established a Polish autonomy in the Vilnius region in 1990–91. After some Polish activists supported the attempted communist coup in Moscow the Lithuanian authorities eliminated the Polish self-rule. The presently existing Electoral Action of Poles in Lithuania is seen by many Lithuanians as a communist rule residue with a nationalistic tint and conflicts over the language of education and naming rights continue, with an uneasy involvement of the government of Poland. The rural Polish-speaking areas are among the economically most depressed regions of Lithuania and high unemployment there has caused significant permanent emigration. The Lithuanian relations with the Russian minority, the actual left-over of the Soviet-imposed settlement, have not been a source of comparable tensions.) by the implementation of Soviet and Lithuanian communist policies that mandated their partial replacement by Russian immigrants. Vilnius was then increasingly settled by Lithuanians and assimilated by Lithuanian culture, which fulfilled, albeit under the oppressive and limiting conditions of the Soviet rule, the long-held dream of Lithuanian nationalists. The economy of Lithuania did well in comparison with other regions of the Soviet Union.

The national developments in Lithuania followed tacit compromise agreements worked out by the Soviet communists, Lithuanian communists and the Lithuanian intelligentsia. Vilnius University was reopened after the war, operating in the Lithuanian language and with a largely Lithuanian student body. It became a center for Baltic studies. General schools in the Lithuanian SSR provided more instruction in Lithuanian than at any previous time in the country's history. The literary Lithuanian language was standardized and refined further as a language of scholarship and Lithuanian literature. The price the Lithuanian intelligentsia ended up paying for the national privileges was their much increased Communist Party membership after de-Stalinization.

Between the death of Stalin in 1953 and the glasnost and perestroika reforms of Mikhail Gorbachev in the mid-1980s, Lithuania functioned as a Soviet society, with all its repressions and peculiarities. Agriculture remained collectivized, property nationalized, and criticism of the Soviet system was severely punished. The country remained largely isolated from the non-Soviet world because of travel restrictions, the persecution of the Catholic Church continued and the nominally egalitarian society was extensively corrupted by the practice of connections and privileges for those who served the system.

The communist era is represented in the museum of Grūtas Park.

=== Rebirth (1988–1990) ===
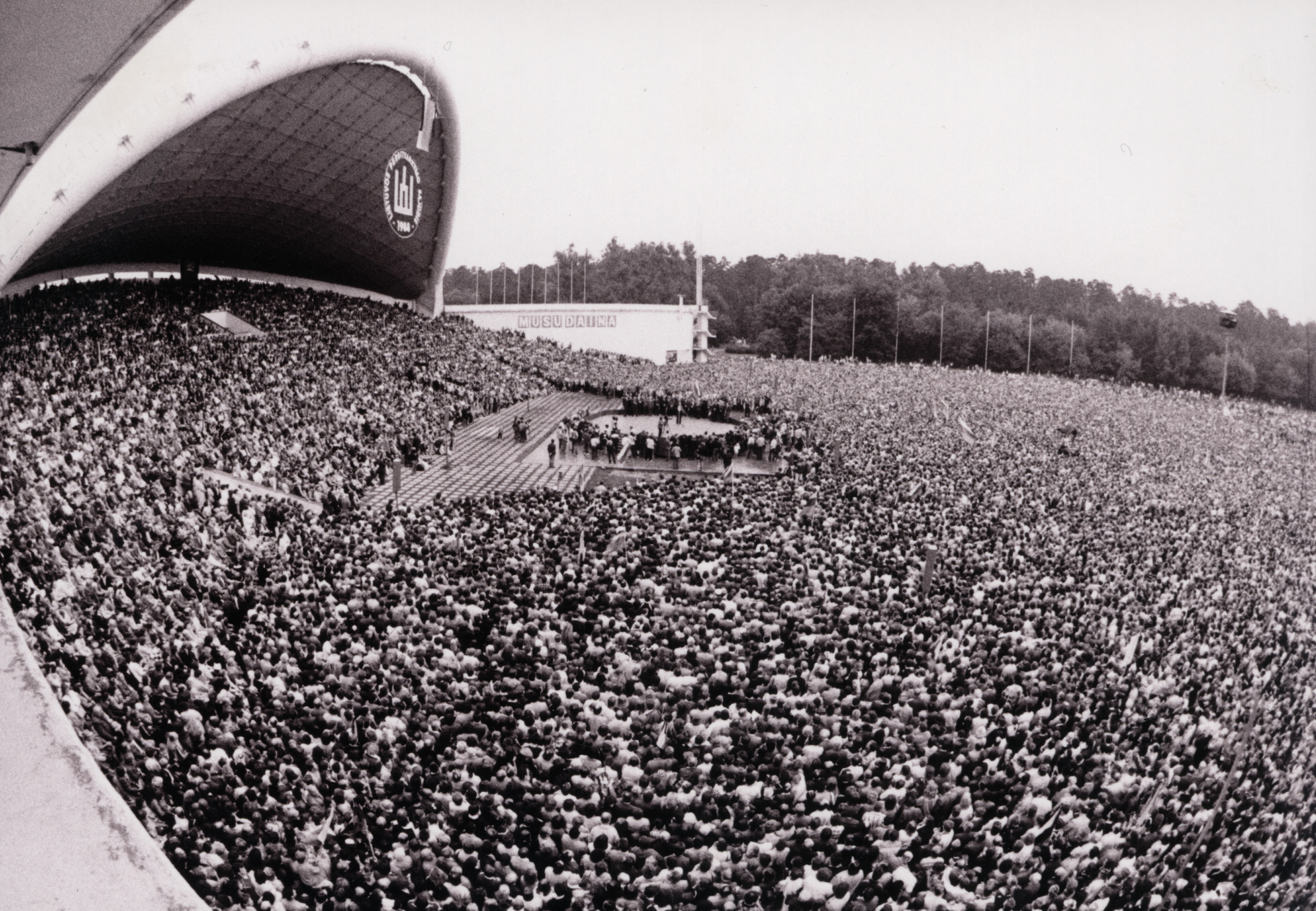
An Anti-Soviet rally in Vingis Park of about 250,000 people. Sąjūdis was a movement which led to the restoration of an Independent State of Lithuania.

Until mid-1988, all political, economic, and cultural life was controlled by the Communist Party of Lithuania (CPL). Lithuanians as well as people in the other two Baltic republics distrusted the Soviet regime even more than people in other regions of the Soviet state, and they gave their own specific and active support to Mikhail Gorbachev's program of social and political reforms known as perestroika and glasnost. Under the leadership of intellectuals, the Reform Movement of Lithuania Sąjūdis was formed in mid-1988, and it declared a program of democratic and national rights, winning nationwide popularity. Inspired by Sąjūdis, the Supreme Soviet of the Lithuanian SSR passed constitutional amendments on the supremacy of Lithuanian laws over Soviet legislation, annulled the 1940 decisions on proclaiming Lithuania a part of the Soviet Union, legalized a multi-party system, and adopted a number of other important decisions, including the return of the national state symbols — the flag of Lithuania and the national anthem. A large number of CPL members also supported the ideas of Sąjūdis, and with Sąjūdis support, Algirdas Brazauskas was elected First Secretary of the Central Committee of the CPL in 1988. On 23 August 1989, 50 years after the Molotov–Ribbentrop Pact, Latvians, Lithuanians and Estonians joined hands in a human chain that stretched 600 kilometres from Tallinn to Vilnius in order to draw the world's attention to the fate of the Baltic nations. The human chain was called the Baltic Way. In December 1989, the Brazauskas-led CPL declared its independence from the Communist Party of the Soviet Union and became a separate social democratic party, renaming itself the Democratic Labour Party of Lithuania in 1990.

== Independence restored (1990–present) ==
=== Struggle for independence (1990–1991) ===
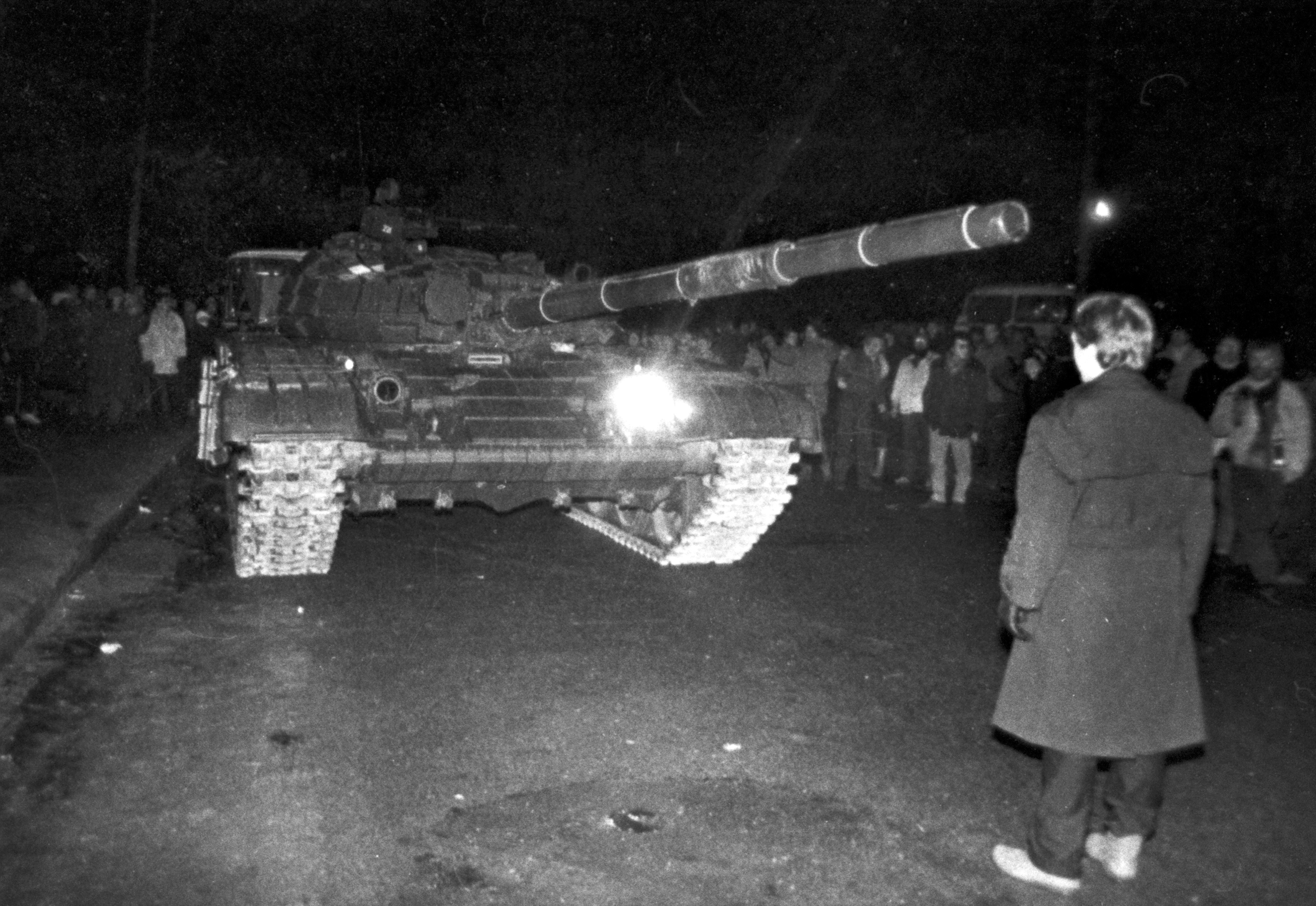
Unarmed Lithuanian citizen standing against a Soviet tank during the January Events.

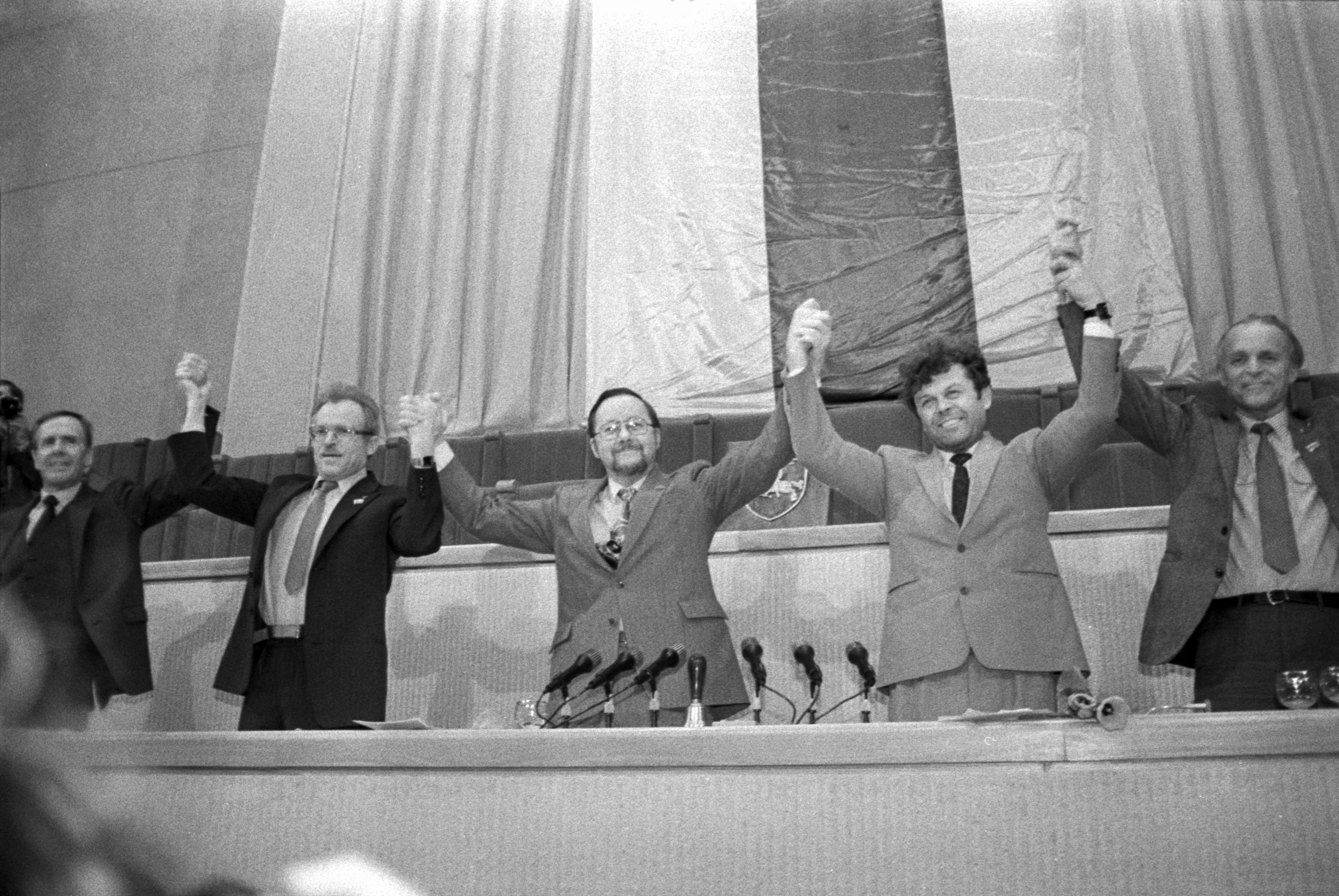
Leaders of the Supreme Council of Lithuania on 11 March 1990, after promulgation of the Act of the Re-Establishment of the State of Lithuania in Vilnius

In early 1990, candidates backed by Sąjūdis won the Lithuanian parliamentary elections. On 11 March 1990, the Supreme Soviet of the Lithuanian SSR proclaimed the Act of the Re-Establishment of the State of Lithuania. The Baltic republics were in the forefront of the struggle for independence, and Lithuania was the first of the Soviet republics to declare independence. Vytautas Landsbergis, a leader of the Sąjūdis national movement, became the head of state and Kazimira Prunskienė led the Cabinet of Ministers. Provisional fundamental laws of the state were passed.

On 15 March, the Soviet Union demanded revocation of the independence and began employing political and economic sanctions against Lithuania. On 18 April, Soviets imposed economic blockade of Lithuania which lasted until the end of June. The Soviet military was used to seize a few public buildings, but violence was largely contained until January 1991. During the January Events in Lithuania, the Soviet authorities attempted to overthrow the elected government by sponsoring the so-called National Salvation Committee. The Soviets forcibly took over the Vilnius TV Tower, killing 14 unarmed civilians and injuring 140. During this assault, the only means of contact to the outside world available was an amateur radio station set up in the Lithuanian Parliament building by Tadas Vyšniauskas whose call sign was LY2BAW. The initial cries for help were received by an American amateur radio operators with the call sign N9RD in Indiana and WB9Z in Illinois. N9RD, WB9Z and other radio operators from around the world were able to relay situational updates to relevant authorities until official United States Department of State personnel were able to go on-air. Moscow failed to act further to crush the Lithuanian independence movement, and the Lithuanian government continued to function.

During the national referendum on 9 February 1991, more than 90% of those who took part in the voting (84.73% of all eligible voters) voted in favor of an independent, democratic Lithuania. During the 1991 Soviet coup d'état attempt in August, Soviet Armed Forces troops took over several communications and other government facilities in Vilnius and other cities, but returned to their barracks when the coup failed. The Lithuanian government banned the Communist Party of the Soviet Union and ordered confiscation of its property. Following the failed coup, Lithuania received widespread international recognition on 6 September 1991 and was admitted to the United Nations on 17 September.

=== Contemporary Republic of Lithuania (1991–present) ===
Flag of Lithuania

As in many countries of the former Soviet Union, the popularity of the independence movement (Sąjūdis in the case of Lithuania) diminished due to worsening economic situation (rising unemployment, inflation, etc.). The Communist Party of Lithuania renamed itself as the Democratic Labour Party of Lithuania (LDDP) and gained a majority of seats against Sąjūdis in the Lithuanian parliamentary elections of 1992. LDDP continued building the independent democratic state and transitioning from a centrally planned economy to a free market economy. In the Lithuanian parliamentary elections of 1996, the voters swung back to the rightist Homeland Union, led by the former Sąjūdis leader Vytautas Landsbergis.

As part of the economic transition to capitalism, Lithuania organized a privatization campaign to sell government-owned residential real estate and commercial enterprises. The government issued investment vouchers to be used in privatization instead of actual currency. People cooperated in groups to collect larger amounts of vouchers for the public auctions and the privatization campaign. Lithuania, unlike Russia, did not create a small group of very wealthy and powerful people. The privatization started with small organizations, and large enterprises (such as telecommunication companies or airlines) were sold several years later for hard currency in a bid to attract foreign investors. Lithuania's monetary system was to be based on the Lithuanian litas, the currency used during the interwar period. Due to high inflation and other delays, a temporary currency, the Lithuanian talonas, was introduced (it was commonly referred to as the Vagnorėlis or Vagnorkė after Prime Minister Gediminas Vagnorius). Eventually the litas was issued in June 1993, and the decision was made to set it up with a fixed exchange rate to the United States dollar in 1994 and to the Euro in 2002.

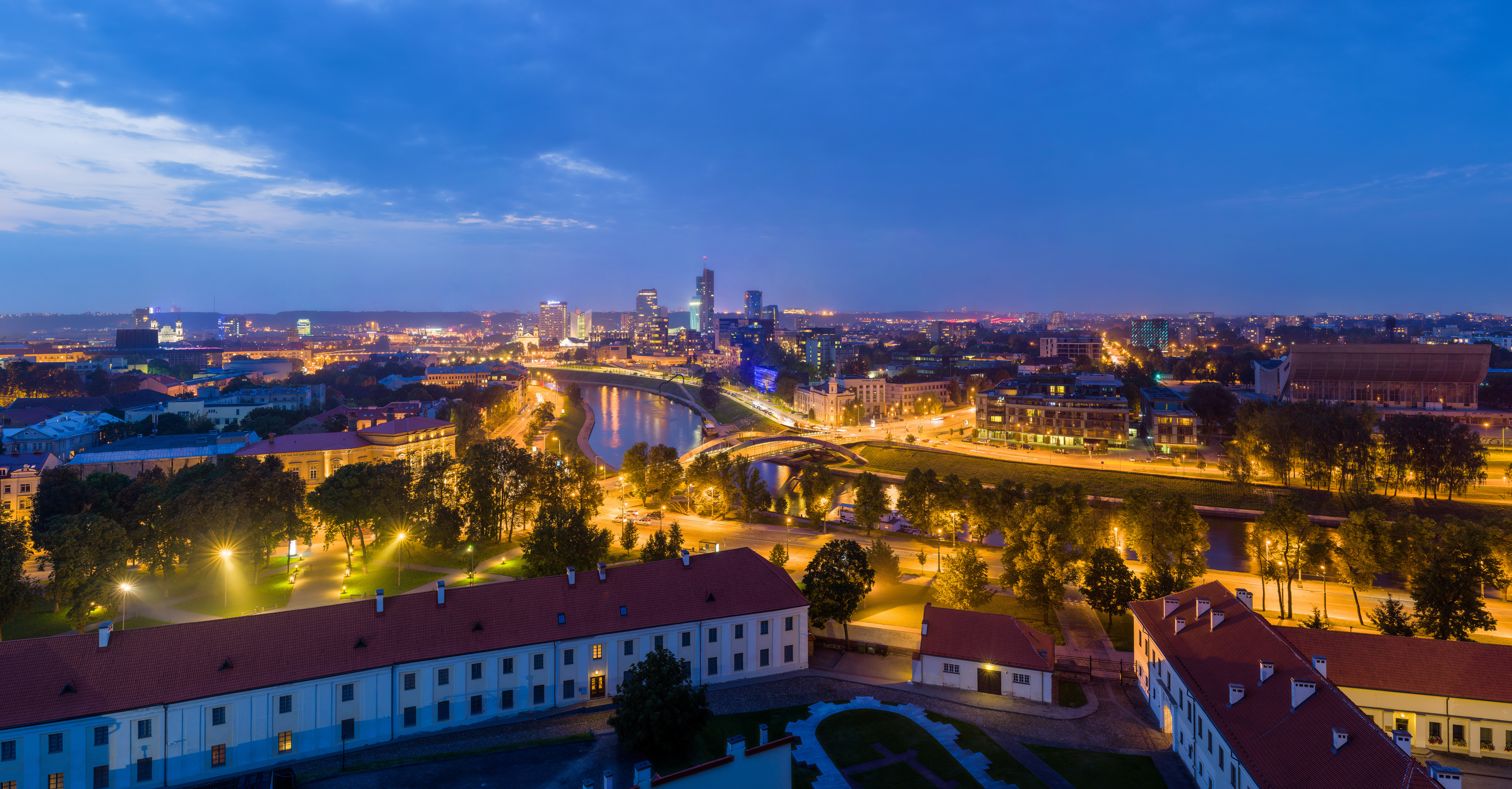
Vilnius, the capital of Lithuania

Despite Lithuania's achievement of complete independence, sizable numbers of Russian Armed Forces troops remained in its territory. Withdrawal of those forces was one of Lithuania's top foreign policy priorities. Russian troop withdrawal was completed by 31 August 1993. The first military of the reborn country were the Lithuanian National Defence Volunteer Forces, who first took an oath at the Supreme Council of Lithuania soon after the declaration of independence. The Lithuanian military built itself to the common standard with the Lithuanian Air Force, Lithuanian Naval Force and Lithuanian Land Force. Interwar paramilitary organisations such as the Lithuanian Riflemen's Union, Young Riflemen, and the Lithuanian Scouts were re-established.

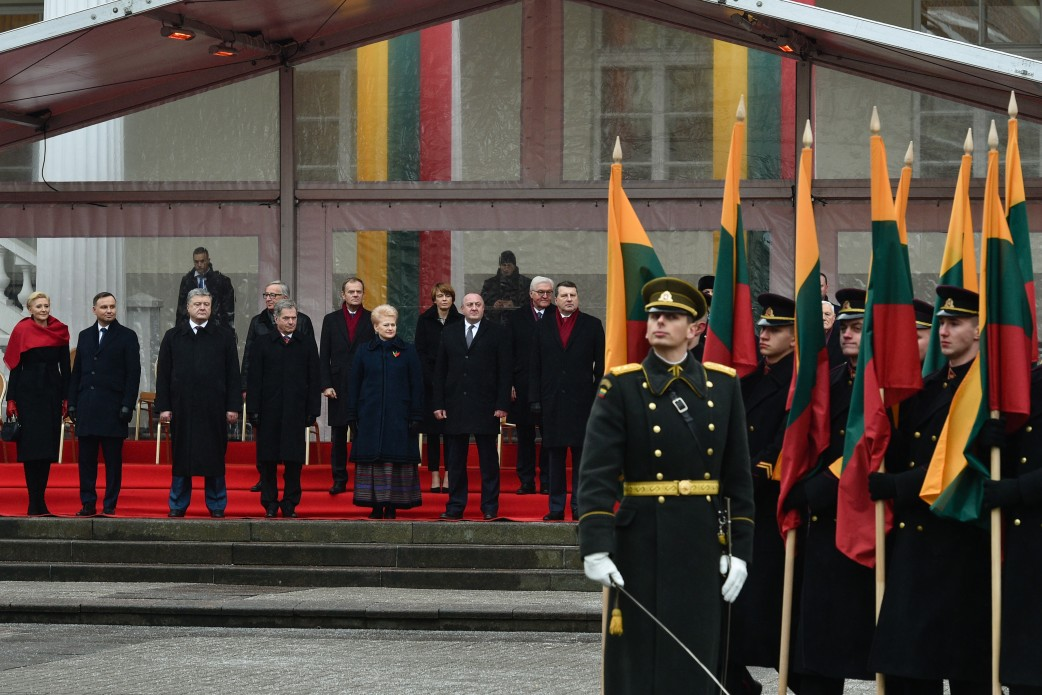
Celebrations of the 100th anniversary of the restoration of statehood of Lithuania with foreign leaders (Vilnius, 2018)

On 27 April 1993, a partnership with the Pennsylvania National Guard was established as part of the State Partnership Program.

Seeking closer ties with the West, Lithuania applied for the North Atlantic Treaty Organization (NATO) membership in 1994. The country had to go through a difficult transition from planned to free market economy in order to satisfy the requirements for European Union (EU) membership. In May 2001, Lithuania became the 141st member of the World Trade Organization. In October 2002, Lithuania was invited to join the European Union and one month later to join the North Atlantic Treaty Organization; it became a member of both in 2004.

As a result of the broader 2008 financial crisis and Great Recession, the Lithuanian economy in 2009 experienced its worst recession since the dissolution of the Soviet Union in 1991. After a boom in growth sparked by Lithuania's 2004 accession to the European Union, the Gross domestic product contracted by 15% in 2009. Especially since Lithuania's admission into the European Union, large numbers of Lithuanians (up to 20% of the population) have moved abroad in search of better economic opportunities to create a significant demographic problem for the small country. On 1 January 2015, Lithuania joined the eurozone and adopted the European Union's single currency as the last of the Baltic states. On 4 July 2018, Lithuania officially joined OECD.

Dalia Grybauskaitė was the first female President of Lithuania (2009–2019) and the first president to be re-elected for a second consecutive term. She was succeeded by Gitanas Nausėda in 2019. On 11–12 July 2023, the NATO summit was held in Vilnius, which was attended by heads of state or government members of NATO countries and its allies.

== Historiography ==
Krapauskas (2010) identifies three main tendencies in the recent historiography. The "postmodern school" is heavily influenced by the French Annales School and presents an entirely new agenda of topics and interdisciplinary research methodologies. Their approach is methodologically controversial and focuses on social and cultural history. It is largely free from the traditional political debates and does not look back to the interwar Šapoka era. Secondly, the "critical-realists" are political revisionists. They focus on controversial political topics in the twentieth century, and reverse 180° the Soviet era interpretations of what was good and bad for Lithuania. They use traditional historical methodologies, with a strong focus on political history. They are often opposed by the third school, the "romantic-traditionalists." After severe constraints in the communist era, the romantic-traditionalists now are eager to emphasize the most positive version of the Lithuanian past and its cultural heritage. They pay less attention to the niceties of documentation and historiography, but they are not the puppets of political conservatives. Indeed, they include many of Lithuania's most respected historians.

== See also ==
- History of Vilnius
- List of hillforts in Lithuania
- List of rulers of Lithuania
- Northern Crusades
- Prime Minister of Lithuania
- Politics of Lithuania
- Black ceramics in Lithuania
