= Butigeidis =

Grand Duke of Lithuania from 1285 to c. 1290

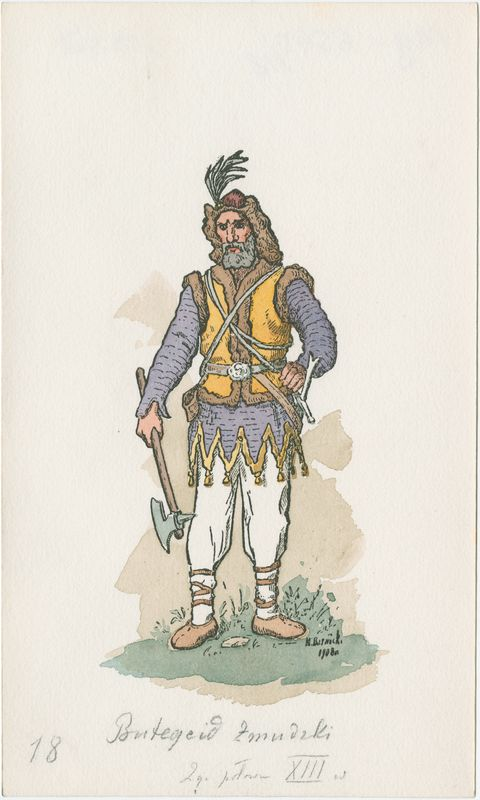
- Hypothetical portrait of Butigeidis, 1908

Grand Duke of Lithuania
- Reign: 1285–1290/1291
- Predecessor: Daumantas
- Successor: Butvydas
- Born: 1240
- Died: 1290/1291
- House: House of Gediminas
- Religion: Baltic religion

Butigeidis (Note: Butigeidis in other languages is also known as: Belarusian: Будзікід, Latin: Budikid, German: Butegeyde, Polish: Butygejd) (died 1290 or 1291) was Grand Duke of Lithuania from 1285 to 1290 or 1291. He assumed power after the death of Daumantas. He is the first known and undisputed member of the Gediminid dynasty.

== Origins ==
There is no definitive information about Butigeidis' origins. Most scholars consider him to be the son of Grand Duke Traidenis. Historians base this conclusion on the fact that Traidenis was known to have children (his daughter, princess Gaudemunda is documented) and likely had sons as well. Additionally, Traidenis possessed sufficient power and influence toward the end of his reign to secure his children's succession to the Lithuanian throne. Following Grand Duke Traidenis' death, there is no evidence of internal power struggles in the country.

Lituanist Jerzy Ochmański expressed a differing opinion. He noted that, according to the texts of Zadonshchina, the descendants of Grand Duke Algirdas refer to themselves as "grandsons of Gediminas and great-grandsons of Skalmantas" and proposed the hypothesis that Skalmantas was the father of Butigeidis (and likely Butvydas). According to Stephen C. Rowell, Skolmantas might also have been Grand Duke Gediminas' father-in-law.

== Reign ==
Butigeidis began his reign at a time when the Teutonic Order had recently conquered Suvalkija, and its vassal, the Livonian Order, launched attacks on Semigallia, a region that was loyal to Butigeidis. According to Chronicon terrae Prussiae by Peter of Dusburg, Butigeidis, in which he is referred to as King of Lithuanians (Rex Lethovvinorum), led about 8,000 troops and attacked the Teutonic stronghold in Sambia in 1289. In the same year, the Teutonic Knights built a castle in Ragainė and their raids intensified. Lithuanians were forced to abandon Kolainiai Castle located on the other bank of the Nemunas River. Butigeidis was the first monarch to build a series of fortified castles along the Nemunas. The castle system was further developed after his death and helped to resist the raids until the second half of the 14th century.

Butigeidis together with his younger brother Butvydas handed over the town of Vawkavysk to the Ruthenian prince Mstislav in compliance with the terms of the peace treaty between Grand Duchy of Lithuania and Principality of Volhynia. He died in 1290 or 1292, and his brother Grand Duke Butvydas (also known as Pukuveras) inherited the crown after his death.

== See also ==
- House of Gediminas – family tree of Butigeidis

== Bibliography ==
- Vytautas Spečiūnas, ed. (2004). Lietuvos valdovai (XIII-XVIII a.): enciklopedinis žinynas (in Lithuanian). Vilnius: Mokslo ir enciklopedijų leidybos institutas. p. 29. ISBN 5-420-01535-8.

Butigeidis House of Gediminas Born: 1240 Died: 1291
Royal titles
Preceded by Daumantas	Grand Duke of Lithuania; 1285–1291	Succeeded by Butvydas
