= Butvydas =

Grand Duke of Lithuania from c. 1290 to 1295

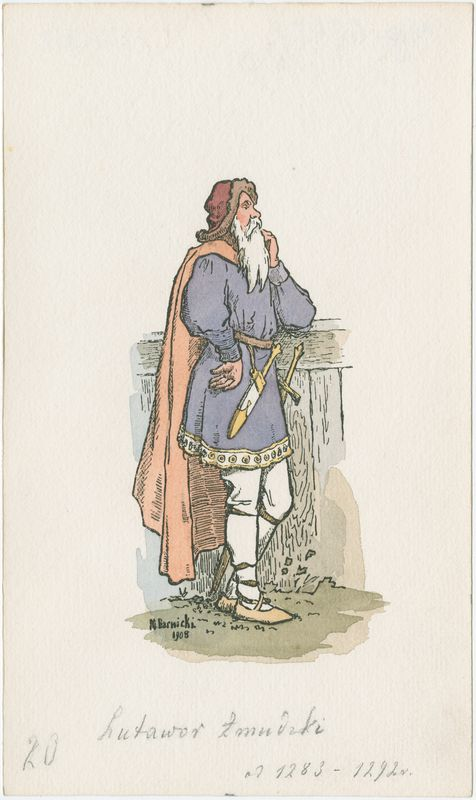
- Artistic impression of Butvydas, 1908

Grand Duke of Lithuania
- Reign: 1290–1295
- Predecessor: Butigeidis
- Successor: Vytenis
- Died: 1295
- Issue: Vytenis; Gediminas; Vainius; Teodoras
- House: House of Gediminas
- Religion: Baltic religion

Butvydas or Pukuveras (Note: also known as Bùdivydas, Pùtavyras, Putùveras Боудивидъ, Liutauras, Пукувер (Pukuvier) Pukuwer or Pucuwerus) (died c. 1295) was Grand Duke of Lithuania from c. 1290 until his death in c. 1295. Butvydas is believed to have been the father of Grand Duke Gediminas, under whom Lithuania emerged as a major Northern and Eastern European power.

== Background ==
There is no conclusive data regarding Butvydas's origins. Some scholars consider him to have been a son of the Grand Duke Traidenis. Jerzy Ochmański, analyzing the Zadonshchina, a Russian literary monument written at the end of the 14th century, concluded that Butvydas's father was Skalmantas. Butvydas is first mentioned in Galician–Volhynian Chronicle dating to April–May 1289, when, together with his elder brother Grand Duke Butigeidis, he handed over the town of Volkovysk to the Ruthenian prince Mstislav in compliance with the terms of the peace treaty between Grand Duchy of Lithuania and Principality of Volhynia.

Butvydas is mentioned again in Chronicon terrae Prussiae by Peter of Dusburg, in which he is referred to as Pukuveras the King of Lithuanians (Pucuwerus rex Lethowie), when in 1291 he sent an army led by his sons—including future Grand Duke Vytenis to fight against the Poles in Kuyavia.

== Reign ==
Chronicon terrae Prussiae by Peter of Dusburg under the year of 1291 mentions Putuwerus (which may be read 'Lutuwerus' from the Gothic script) as "Rex Lethoviae" ("Lithuanian king").

Butvydas's reign appears to have overlapped with that of his brother, Grand Duke Butigeidis, and some historians propose that the two may have effectively shared power, similar to later instances of co-regency observed in the dynasty, like the grandsons Algirdas and Kęstutis. After the death of Butigeidis, Butvydas became the sole monarch.

Butvydas’ short reign occurred during a critical period of Lithuanian consolidation against external threats, including the Teutonic Order’s annual attacks on Samogitia, fights with Order-allied Poles in Masovia and Mongol influence in neighbouring Ruthenian principalities. Historian Stephen Christopher Rowell argues that Butvydas laid administrative foundations for his successors, enabling Vytenis and Gediminas to centralize authority and expand Lithuania’s territory in the former Kievan Rus'. Despite this, no surviving records detail his specific policies or military campaigns, leaving historians reliant on comparative analysis of Slavic and Germanic chronicles.

== See also ==
- family of Gediminas – family tree of Butvydas
- Gediminids

== Bibliography ==
- Vytautas Spečiūnas, ed. (2004). Lietuvos valdovai (XIII-XVIII a.): enciklopedinis žinynas (in Lithuanian). Vilnius: Mokslo ir enciklopedijų leidybos institutas. p. 30. ISBN 5-420-01535-8.

Butvydas House of Gediminas Born: ? Died: 1295
Royal titles
Preceded by Butigeidis	Grand Duke of Lithuania; 1291–1295	Succeeded by Vytenis
