= List of Lithuanian monarchs =

Monarchy of Lithuania
- Royal coat of arms

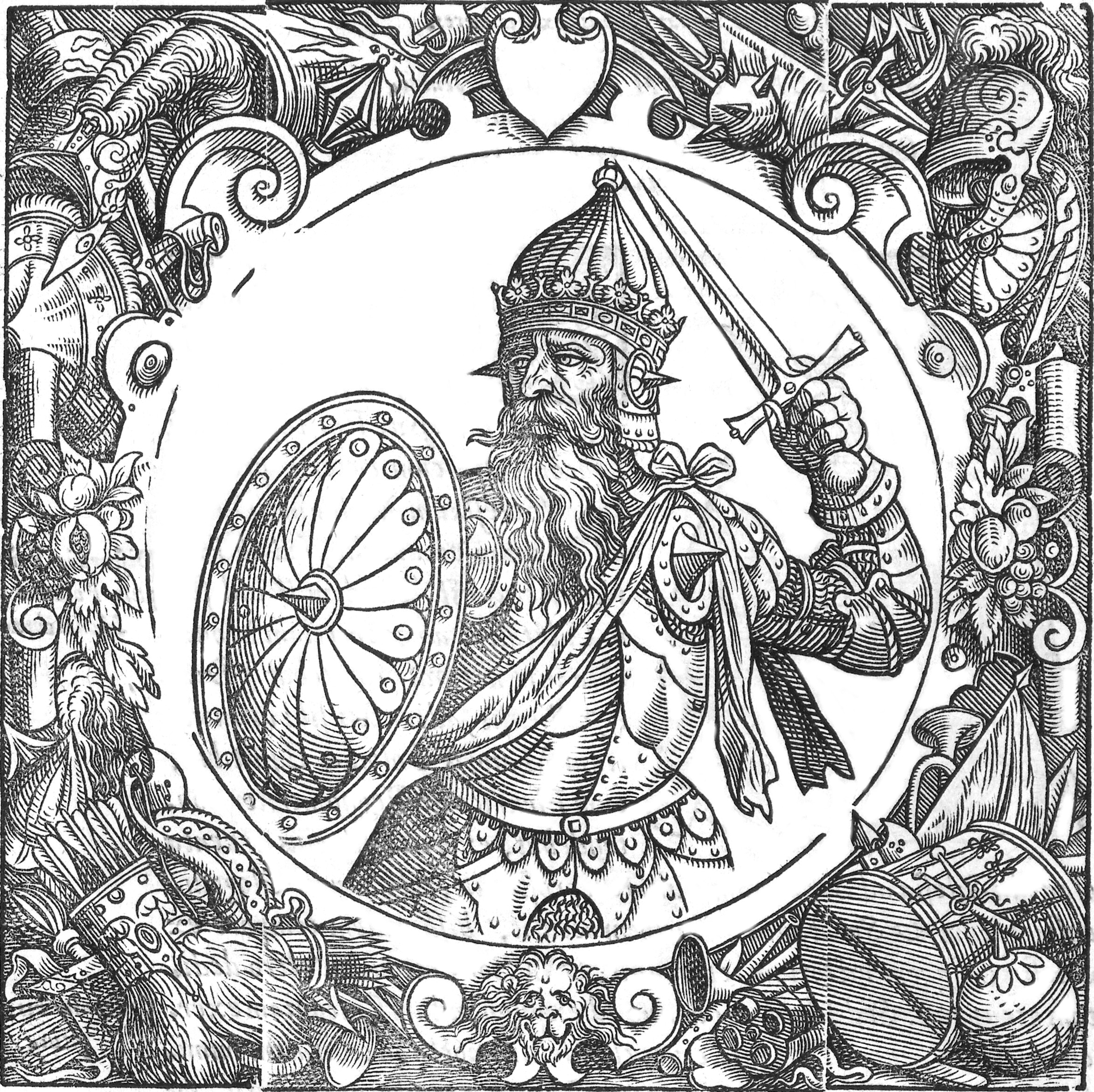
- King Mindaugas

Details
- Style: His Majesty or Her Majesty (Note: Only formally held by King Mindaugas I and King-elect Mindaugas II.)
- First monarch: Mindaugas I (Note: Grand Duke, later King of Lithuania.)
- Last monarch: Stanisław II August (Note: As Grand Duke of Lithuania.) Mindaugas II (Note: As King of Lithuania)
- Formed: 1236
- Abolished: 1795
- Residences: Mindaugas' Castle, Voruta (1253−1263); Gediminas' Castle, Vilnius (late 13th century−late 15th century); Palace of the Grand Dukes of Lithuania, Vilnius (late 15th century−1665); New Grodno Castle, Grodno (second half of the 18th century)
- Appointer: Hereditary (1253–1574); Szlachta (1574–1795); Hereditary (1918)
- Pretender: Prince Inigo of Urach (disputed)

This is a list of Lithuanian monarchs who ruled Lithuania from its inception until the fall of the Grand Duchy of Lithuania in 1795. The Lithuanian monarch bore the title of Grand Duke, with the exception of Mindaugas, who was crowned king in 1253. Other Lithuanian rulers, such as Vytautas the Great, also attempted to secure a royal coronation, but these efforts were unsuccessful.

Until 1569, the Lithuanian monarchy was hereditary. In 1386, Grand Duke Jogaila was elected King of Poland. From that point onward, with some interruptions, the two states were united in a personal union, sharing a common ruler until 1569, when they were formally merged by the Union of Lublin to form the Polish–Lithuanian Commonwealth. The monarch of this new state was elected in a free election by the entire nobility.

From the Christianization of Lithuania until 1569, the inauguration of the Grand Duke took place in Vilnius Cathedral, where the Bishop of Vilnius placed Gediminas's Cap on the ruler’s head. After the Union of Lublin, the title of Grand Duke of Lithuania was assumed during the coronation in Kraków.

In 1918, there was an attempt to establish the Kingdom of Lithuania under German auspices, but the plan ultimately failed.

== Titles ==
The first Lithuanian rulers did not leave behind any written documents, so we do not know their native titles, but only those given to them by their neighbors. In Kievan Rus', they were called knyaz (kniaz’) or grand knyas (velikii kniaz’), while in the German sphere they were referred to as elder (senior), leader (dux), and sometimes prince (princeps).

After the coronation Mindaugas adopted royal title: "By the Grace of God, King of the Lithuania" (Latin: Dei Gratia Rex Lettowiae). The first mention of a Lithuanian king predates the establishment of the Christian kingdom itself: according to the Livonian Rhymed Chronicle, Mindaugas' father was a great king who "had no equal in his time."

As the territory of Lithuania expanded eastwards, other king-titled grand dukes who ruled the country adopted similar titles for introducing themselves abroad. For instance, Grand Duke of Lithuania Vytenis was sometimes regarded as Rex Lethowinorum ('King of Lithuanians') while his successor Gediminas was known by the title, in Latin: Rex Lithuanorum et Multorum Ruthenorum ('King of Lithuanians and many Ruthenians'). Some German sources also titled Gediminas as Rex de Owsteiten ('King of Aukštaitija'). Gediminas' right to use the Latin rex, which the papacy had been claiming the right to grant from the 13th century onwards, was not universally recognized in Catholic sources. Thus, he was called rex sive dux ("King or Duke") in one source; Pope John XXII, in a letter to the King of France, referred to Gediminas as "the one who calls himself rex". However, the Pope did call Gediminas rex when addressing him (regem sive ducem, "king or duke").

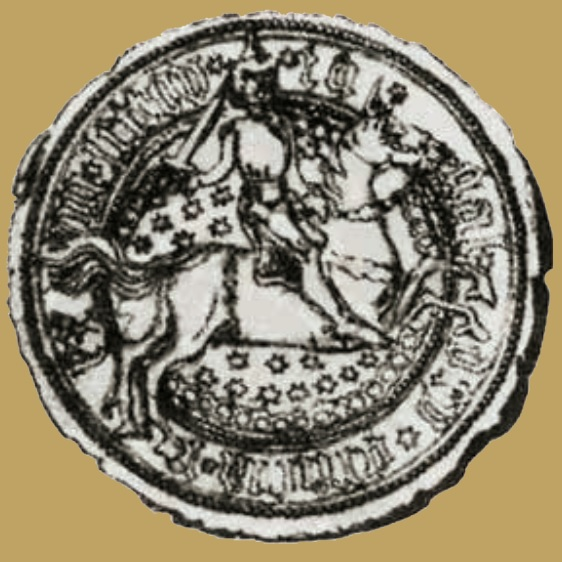
Seal of Jogaila with his title (in Latin) as 'King in Lithuania', used in 1377–1386, before becoming the King of Poland in 1386

Teutonic knights referred to Algirdas and his wife Uliana (Julijona) as "Grand King of Lithuania" and "Grand Queen of Lithuania". In early 2000s a plaque with a mysterious script, dating to the 13th–14th centuries, which was nailed to a wooden base, was found during an archeological research in the Courtyard of the Old Arsenal of the Vilnius Castle Complex, part of which is translatable from the Ancient Greek as Algirdos Basileus (a Greek term Basileus means a 'king' or an 'emperor'). In 1370, Algirdas wrote a letter to the Ecumenical Patriarch of Constantinople where he titled himself as Basileus, showcasing his status as an equal sovereign ruler to the Byzantine Emperor.

Algirdas' son Jogaila since 1377 titled himself as 'King of Lithuania'.

Even though it is traditionally accepted that Mindaugas was the only true king, all historical records, with the exception of Slavic annals, mention Lithuanian rulers as kings until 1386.

=== Grand Duke ===
Officially, the title of Grand Duke of Lithuania (Magnus Dux Lithuaniae) was introduced after the Pact of Horodło in 1413. Until then, previous monarchs were called by different titles, including kings. This was because in Lithuania, unlike in the majority of other European monarchies, the Grand Duke was a sovereign monarch who was accountable to no one, thus de facto king.

Following the Act of Krėva with the Kingdom of Poland in 1385, the full Latin title was changed to Dei Gratia Rex Poloniae Magnus Dux Lithuaniae ('By the Grace of God, King of Poland and Grand Duke of Lithuania').

=== Supreme Duke ===
The title of the Grand Duke of Lithuania mostly came into force during the reign of Grand Duke Vytautas the Great, who concluded the Ostrów Agreement with his cousin Jogaila in 1392 and the agreement was confirmed in the Pact of Vilnius and Radom in 1401. Since then Jogaila was titled the Supreme Duke of Lithuania (supremus dux Lithuaniae). Vytautas the Great gained the de facto rule of Lithuania, which was recognized by the treaties. In 1398, the Lithuanian nobility declared Vytautas the Great as the King of Lithuania and, following the Congress of Lutsk in 1429, the crowning was sanctioned by Sigismund, Holy Roman Emperor. However, Vytautas died before the crown arrived.

Jogaila's son Władysław III also titled himself as the Supreme Duke of Lithuania. John I Albert unilaterally declared himself as the Supreme Duke of Lithuania in 1492, but this title was rejected by the Lithuanian Council of Lords.

In 1544–1548, Sigismund I the Old expressed his supreme monarchical authority in Lithuania by again using the Supreme Duke of Lithuania title when his son Sigismund II Augustus was his vicegerent in Lithuania.

== Inaugurations of Lithuanian monarchs ==
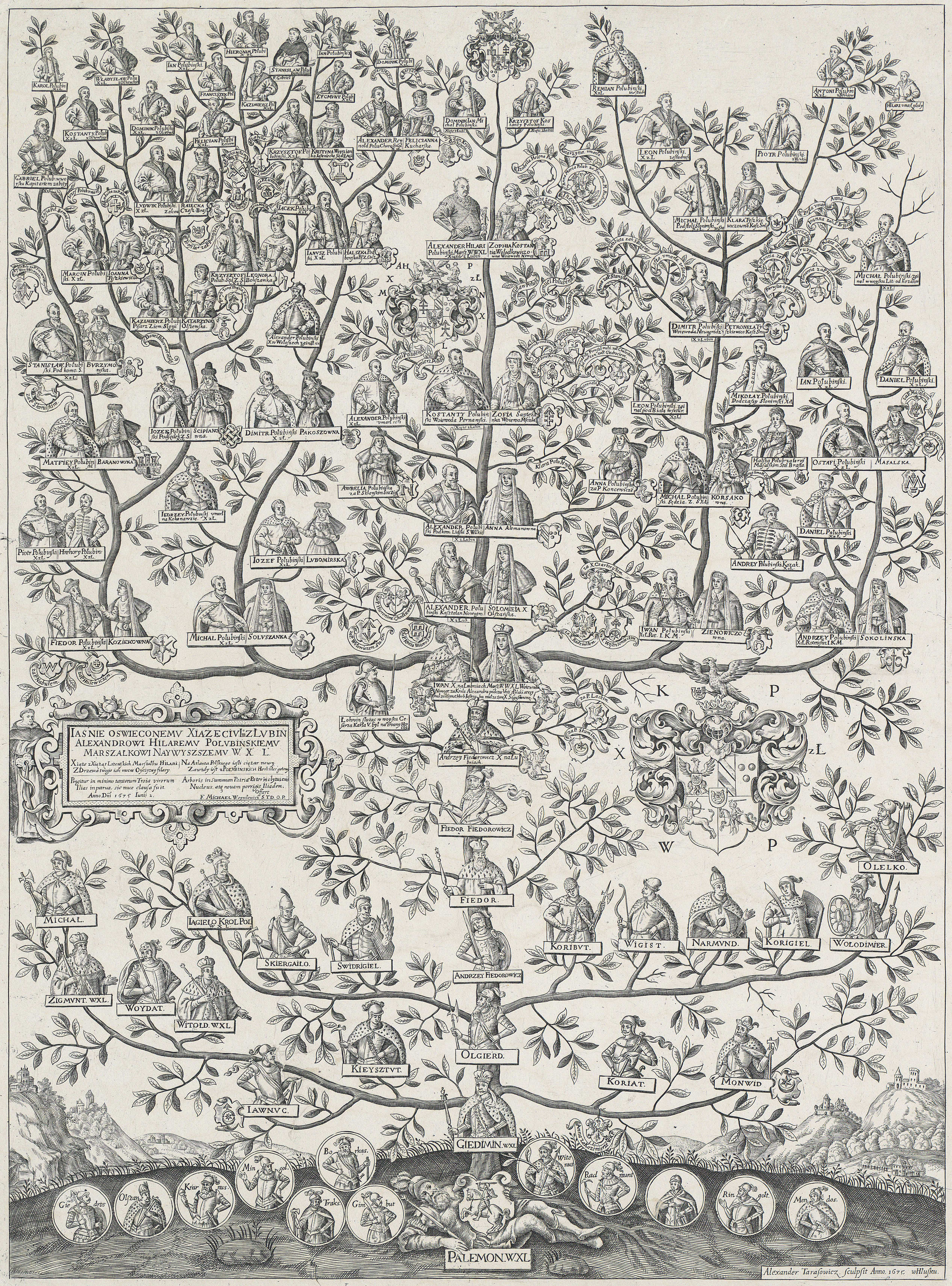
The Genealogical Tree of the Lithuanian Monarchs (stemming from Palemonas) of Alexander Hilarius Polubinski, Grand Marshall of the Grand Duchy Lithuania, 1675

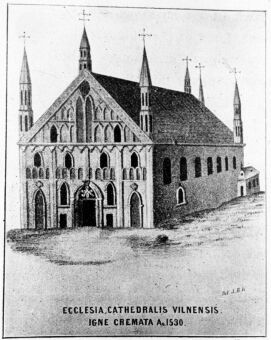
Vilnius Cathedral, built in 1407, served as a venue for the ceremonies of the Grand Dukes of Lithuania

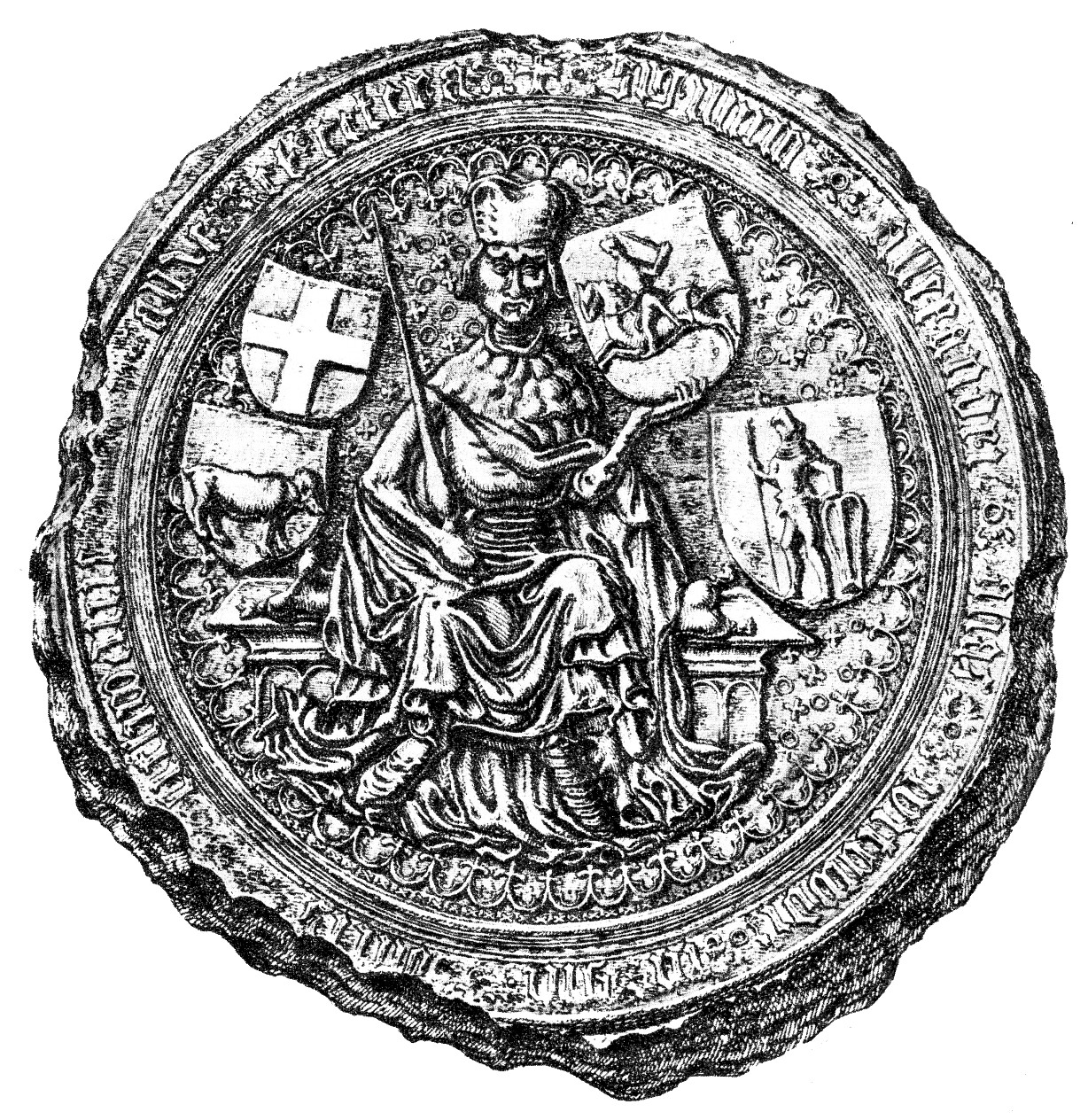
Vytautas' majestic seal of 1407, where he is seen wearing Gediminas' Cap

The inaugurations of the Lithuanian monarchs were held in Vilnius Cathedral and consisted of the placement of Gediminas' Cap on the Lithuanian monarch's head and the presentation of a sword. The cap was placed on the head by the Bishop of Vilnius and the sword was presented by the Grand Marshal of Lithuania. The regalia of Vytautas the Great consisted of Gediminas' Cap, sword, ring, flag, and seal.

The first inauguration ceremony of a Lithuanian Grand Duke about which there is reliable information is that of Casimir IV Jagiellon, as reported by Jan Długosz. Casimir IV was sent by his older brother King of Poland and Hungary, Supreme Duke of Lithuania Władysław III, to Lithuania to rule in his name. But instead he was elected as Grand Duke upon his arrival to Vilnius on 29 June 1440, with the ringing of church bells and the singing of the Te Deum laudamus. This was breaching the agreements of the Union of Grodno (1432) and terminating the Polish–Lithuanian union. It manifested Lithuania as a sovereign state and its ruler Casimir IV Jagiellon stressed himself as a "free lord" (pan – dominus). According to historian Edvardas Gudavičius, Bishop of Vilnius put a Gediminas' Cap in the Vilnius Cathedral on his head, despite the Polish nobility's opposition.

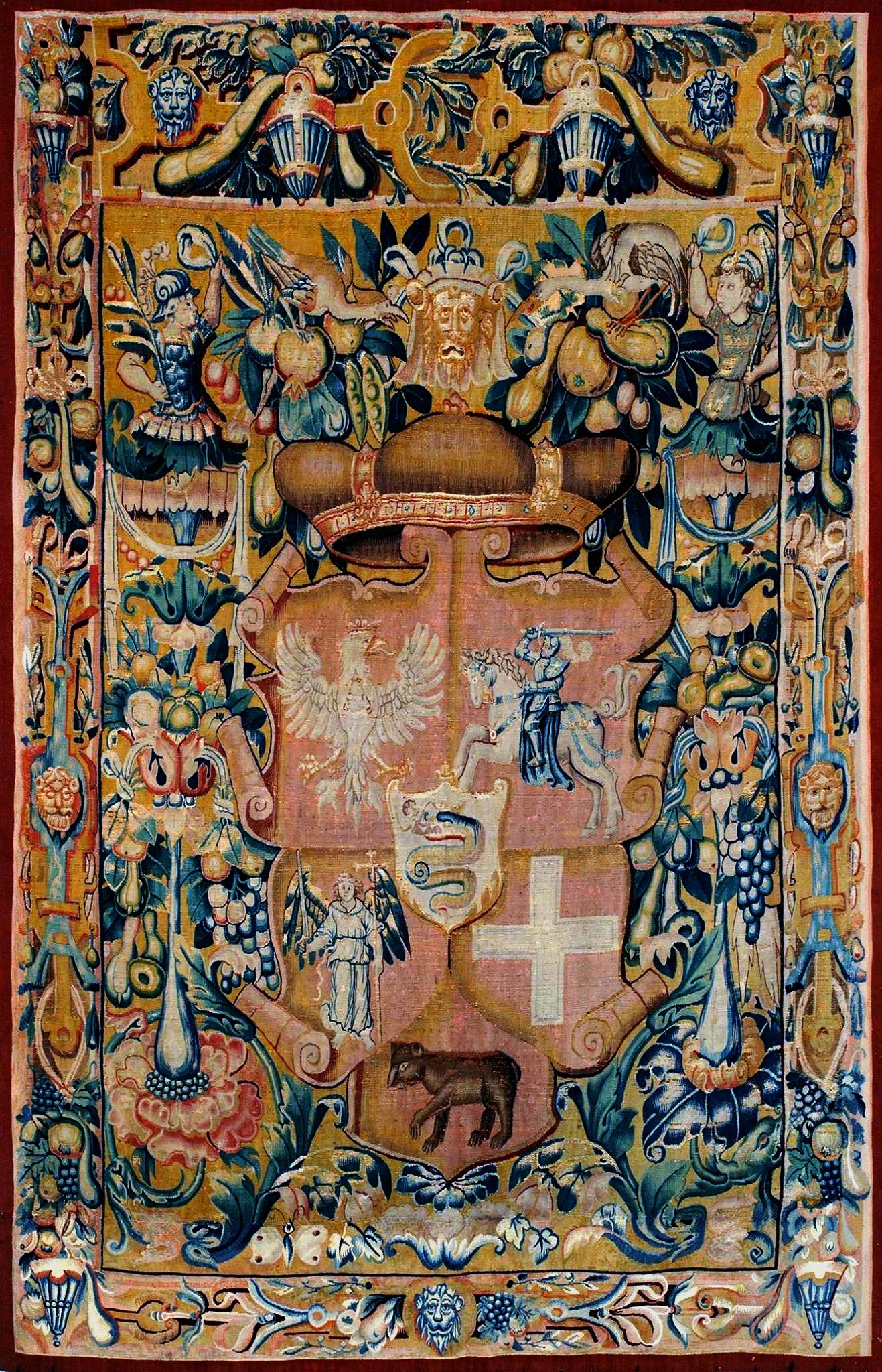
Tapestry with the coat of arms of Grand Duke Sigismund II Augustus, decorated with Gediminas' Cap, circa 1548

Another documented inauguration is the enthronement of Alexander Jagiellon in 1492. Alexander was appointed Grand Duke by his father, nevertheless, a formal election of the ruler was held as part of a general assembly, which was attended for the first time by representatives from all the lands of the Grand Duchy. The course of the ceremony was documented by Maciej Stryjkowski, who reported that after the election lords elevated Alexander in the cathedral. The newly elected ruler was dressed "in a ducal cap with pearls and precious stones set in it, also the usual robe that today the princes of the Reich wear at the imperial coronation." Then Bishop of Vilnius Wojciech Tabor blessed him and held a pastoral exhortation over him. Then the Grand Marshal of Lithuania Petras Jonaitis Mantigirdaitis handed Alexander a bare sword and a sceptre. Subsequently, the Poles considered electing Alexander Jagiellon as the King of Poland, however instead of him John I Albert was elected as the King of Poland in August 1492 and this led to another termination of the Polish–Lithuanian union.

Stryjkowski also relayed the election and inauguration of Sigismund I as Grand Duke of Lithuania on 20 October 1509. The ceremony was again attended by Bishop Wojciech Tabor, who this time not only blessed but also placed a cap on the ruler's head. In turn, Grand Marshal Michael Glinski presented him with a sword. Sigismund received the oath of the Lithuanian lords while sitting on the throne. According to Stryjkowski, the cap was: "of red velvet with gold spheres set with precious stones".

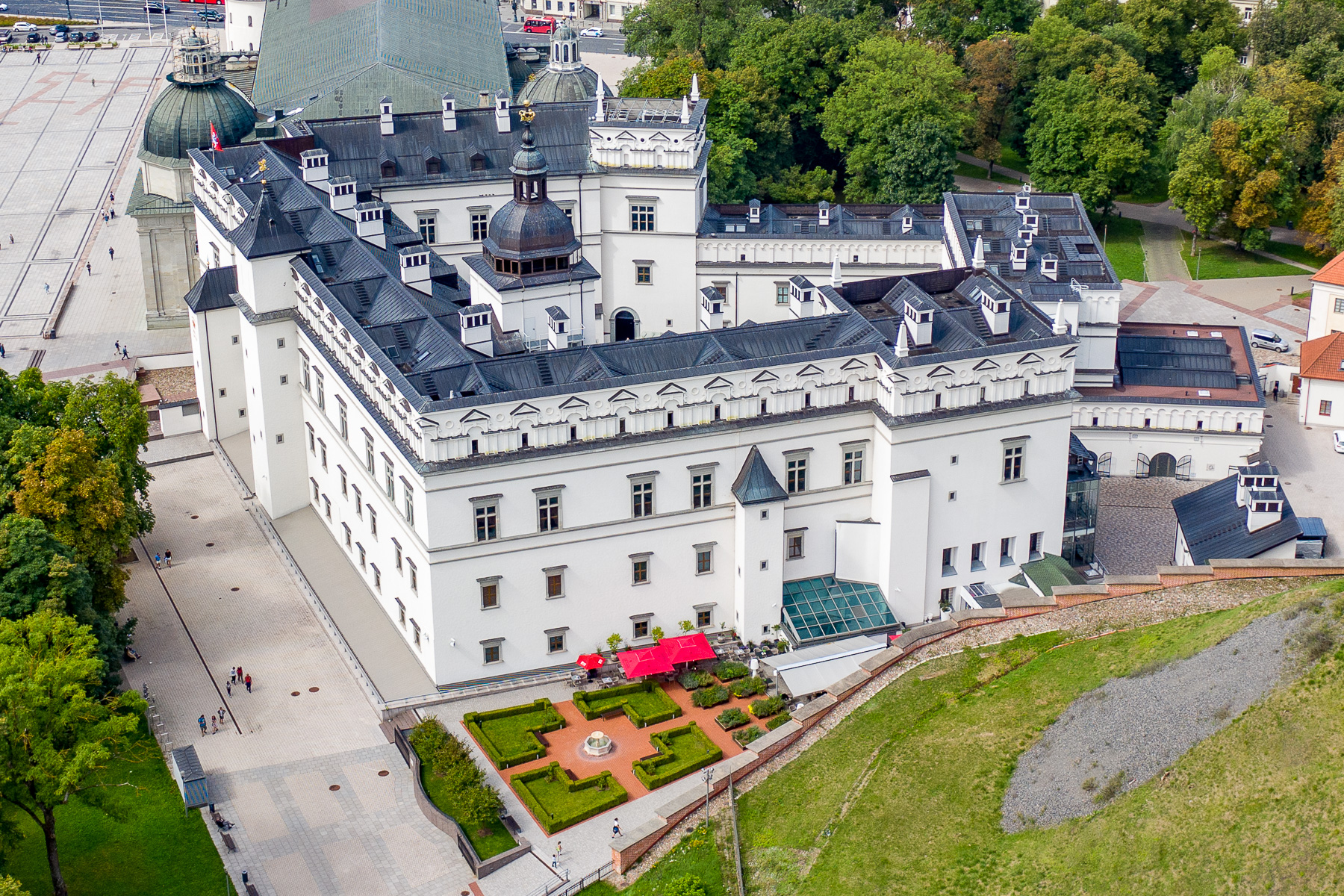
Palace of the Grand Dukes of Lithuania, where the ceremony of Sigismund II Augustus was held

The last ceremony to elevate a grand duke took place on 18 October 1529, when Sigismund Augustus was elevated to this dignity during his father's lifetime. The ceremony occurred in the great hall of the newly built lower castle, as the cathedral burned down that same year. The young Sigismund Augustus sat on the throne between his parents, surrounded by members of the council of lords. The cap was placed on the ruler's head by the Bishop of Vilnius, while the Grand Marshal presented him with a sword. Following the Union of Lublin, which formed the federative Polish–Lithuanian Commonwealth in 1569, and the death of the last male Gediminid ruler Sigismund II Augustus in 1572, separate inaugurations in Vilnius Cathedral were abolished, therefore Gediminas' Cap lost its ceremonial significance. The insignias of the Lithuanian rulers were not preserved and following the Union of Lublin only the seal (kept by the Grand Chancellor of Lithuania) and the flag (carried near the ruler by the Grand Flag Bearer of Lithuania) remained.

The demand for a separate inauguration ceremony of the Grand Duke of Lithuania was raised by the nobles of the Grand Duchy of Lithuania (e.g. Mikołaj "the Red" Radziwiłł, Eustachy Wołłowicz, Jan Karol Chodkiewicz, Konstanty Ostrogski) during negotiations for the Union of Lublin. It was not officially included in it, however. Nevertheless, before the 1576 Polish–Lithuanian royal election a congress of the Grand Duchy of Lithuania's nobles was held on 20 April 1576 in Grodno which adopted a Universal, signed by the participating Lithuanian nobles, which stipulated that if the delegates of the Grand Duchy of Lithuania were pressured by the Poles in the Election sejm, the Lithuanians would not be obliged by any oath to the Union of Lublin and would have the right to select a separate monarch.

On 29 May 1580, bishop Merkelis Giedraitis in the Vilnius Cathedral presented Grand Duke Stephen Báthory (King of Poland since 1 May 1576) a luxuriously decorated sword and a hat adorned with pearls (both were sanctified by Pope Gregory XIII himself), while this ceremony manifested the sovereignty of the Grand Duchy of Lithuania and had the meaning of elevation of the new Grand Duke of Lithuania, this way ignoring the stipulations of the Union of Lublin. Nevertheless, per the Union of Lublin, the rulers of the Polish–Lithuanian Commonwealth were elected in joint Polish–Lithuanian election sejms until the Third Partition in 1795 and received separate titles of the King of Poland and Grand Duke of Lithuania. During the coronations of joint Polish–Lithuanian monarchs, the Polish crown was also announced as a property of both the Polish and Lithuanian nobles.

== List ==
=== House of Mindaugas (1236–1267) ===
Name	Portrait	Birth	Marriage(s)	Death	Claim
Grand Duke/King; Mindaugas; 1236 – 17 July 1251 as Grand Duke 17 July 1251 – 12 September 1263 (crowned 1253) as King		c. 1203 Son of mythological Ringaudas	(1) NN; 2 children (2) Morta; 2 or 4 children (3) NN, sister of Morta	1263; Aglona; Assassinated by Treniota and Daumantas; Aged about 60	Right of conquest Son of mythological Ringaudas
Grand Duke; Treniota; 1263 – 1264		Unknown Son of NN, Mindaugas' sister and Vykintas	Unknown; 1 child	1264; Murdered by servants loyal to Mindaugas' son Vaišvilkas	Right of conquest Nephew of Mindaugas
Grand Duke; Vaišvilkas; Laurušas; 1264 – 1267		Unknown Son of Mindaugas and NN, Mindaugas' first wife	Unmarried and childless	1268; Was murdered by Leo I of Galicia	Right of conquest Son of Mindaugas

=== House of Monomakh (1267–1269) ===
Name	Portrait	Birth	Marriage(s)	Death	Claim
Grand Duke; Shvarn; Lithuanian: Švarnas; 1267 – 1269		c. 1230; Halych Son of Daniel of Galicia	NN, daughter of Mindaugas	c. 1269; Kholm; Aged about 39	Offered by Vaišvilkas Brother-in-law of Vaišvilkas

=== House of Mindaugas (1269–1285) ===
Name	Portrait	Birth	Marriage(s)	Death	Claim
Grand Duke; Traidenis; 1270 – 1282		1220	Ona of Masovia; 1 child	1282; Kernavė; Aged 62	Right of conquest Possibly a relative of Mindaugas
Grand Duke; Daumantas; 1282 – 1285		Unknown	Unknown	3 March 1285; Died in a battle by Tver	Possibly a son of Mindaugas

=== House of Gediminas (1285–1440) ===
Name	Portrait	Arms	Birth	Marriage(s)	Death	Claim
Grand Duke; Butigeidis; 1285 – 1291		None known	Unknown Son of Skalmantas (?)	Unknown	1291	Possibly a relative of Daumantas
Grand Duke; Butvydas; 1291 – 1295		None known	Unknown Son of Skalmantas (?)	Unknown	c. 1294–1295	Brother of Butigeidis
Grand Duke; Vytenis; 1295 – 1316		None known	1260 Son of Butvydas	Vikinda; 1 child	1316; Aged 56	Son of Butvydas
Grand Duke; Gediminas; 1316 – 1341		None known	c. 1275 Son of Butvydas	Jaunė; 13 children	c. 1341; Raudonė; Aged about 66	Son of Butvydas
Grand Duke; Jaunutis; 1341 – 1345		None known	c. 1306−1309 Son of Gediminas and Jaunė	Unknown; 3 children	c. 1366; Aged 57−60	Son of Gediminas
Grand Duke; Algirdas; 1345 – 1377			c. 1296 Son of Gediminas and Jaunė	(1) Maria of Vitebsk; 6 children (2) Uliana of Tver; 8 children	c. 1377; Maišiagala; Aged about 81	Right of conquest Son of Gediminas
Grand Duke; Jogaila Algirdaitis; May 1377 – August 1381			c. 1352−1362; Vilnius Son of Algirdas and Uliana of Tver	(1) Jadwiga of Poland; 1 child (2) Anna of Cilli; 1 child (3) Elizabeth of Pilica (4) Sophia of Halshany; 3 children	1 June 1434; Gródek Jagielloński; Aged 72−82	Son of Algirdas
Grand Duke; Kęstutis probably 1345 – 1382 attested: 1349 – 1351; 1381 – 1382			c. 1297; Senieji Trakai Son of Gediminas and Jaunė	Birutė; 9 children	1382; Kreva; Died in captivity possibly murdered by the order of Jogaila; Aged 84–85	Right of conquest Son of Gediminas
Grand Duke; Jogaila Algirdaitis; 3 August 1382 – 1 June 1434 (51 years, 302 days)			c. 1352−1362; Vilnius Son of Algirdas and Uliana of Tver	(1) Jadwiga of Poland; 1 child (2) Anna of Cilli; 1 child (3) Elizabeth of Pilica (4) Sophia of Halshany; 3 children	1 June 1434; Gródek Jagielloński; Aged 72−82	Right of conquest Son and chosen heir of Algirdas
Act of Kreva signed in 1385 Poland and Lithuania de jure are ruled by one monarch but remain to be separate states.
King of Poland and Grand Duke; Jogaila Algirdaitis; 3 August 1382 – 1 June 1434 (51 years, 302 days)			c. 1352−1362; Vilnius Son of Algirdas and Uliana of Tver	(1) Jadwiga of Poland; 1 child (2) Anna of Cilli; 1 child (3) Elizabeth of Pilica (4) Sophia of Halshany; 3 children	1 June 1434; Gródek Jagielloński; Aged 72−82	Son and chosen heir of Algirdas
Astrava Agreement signed in 1392 Following the Lithuanian Civil War, Vytautas acts as regent de jure. He is recognized as the Grand Duke after Pact of Vilnius and Radom in 1401. His successors rule as Grand Dukes alongside Polish monarchs until 1440.
Grand Duke; King-elect of Lithuania; Vytautas; Vytautas the Great; 1401 – 27 October 1430			c. 1350; Senieji Trakai Son of Kęstutis and Birutė	(1) Anna; 1 child (2) Uliana Olshanska	27 October 1430; Trakai; Aged about 80	Offered by Jogaila Son of Kęstutis
Grand Duke; Švitrigaila; October 1430 – 1 August 1432			Before 1370; Vilnius Son of Algirdas and Uliana of Tver	Anna of Tver; 1 child	10 February 1452; Lutsk; Aged about 82	Son and chosen heir of Algirdas
Grand Duke; Sigismund Kęstutaitis; Lithuanian: Žygimantas Kęstutaitis; 1432 – 1440			1365; Trakai Son of Kęstutis and Birutė	Unknown; 1 child	20 March 1440; Trakai; Murdered by supporters of Švitrigaila; Aged 75	Son of Kęstutis

=== House of Jagiellon (1440–1569) ===
Name	Portrait	Arms	Birth	Marriage(s)	Death	Claim
King of Poland and Grand Duke; Władysław 1 June 1434 – 10 November 1444 (10 years, 162 days)			31 October 1424; Kraków Son of Jogaila Algirdaitis and Sophia of Halshany	Unmarried and childless	10 November 1444 (presumed); Varna; Aged 20	Son of Jogaila
King of Poland and Grand Duke; Casimir Andrew; Lithuanian: Kazimieras Jogailaitis; 29 June 1440 – 7 June 1492 (51 years, 344 days)			30 November 1427; Kraków Son of Jogaila Algirdaitis and Sophia of Halshany	Elisabeth of Austria; 13 children	7 June 1492; Old Grodno Castle; Aged 64	Son of Jogaila
King of Poland and Grand Duke; John I Albert (disputed); August 1492 – 17 June 1501 (~ 7 years, 10 months)			27 December 1459; Kraków Son of Casimir and Elisabeth of Austria	Unmarried and childless	17 June 1501; Toruń; Aged 41	Son of Casimir
King of Poland and Grand Duke; Alexander Jagiellon; Lithuanian: Aleksandras Jogailaitis; 30 July 1492 – 19 August 1506 (14 years, 20 days)			5 August 1461; Kraków Son of Kazimieras Jogailaitis and Elisabeth of Austria	Helena of Moscow	19 August 1506; Vilnius; Aged 45	Son of Casimir IV Jagiellon
King of Poland and Grand Duke; Sigismund the Old; Sigismund I the Old; Lithuanian: Žygimantas Senasis; 20 October December 1506 – 1 April 1548 (41 years, 164 days)			1 January 1467; Kozienice Son of Kazimieras Jogailaitis and Elisabeth of Austria	(1) Barbara Zápolya; 2 children (2) Bona Sforza; 6 children	1 April 1548; Kraków; Aged 81	Son of Casimir IV Jagiellon
King of Poland and Grand Duke; Sigismund Augustus; Lithuanian: Žygimantas Augustas; 18 October 1529 – 7 July 1572 (42 years, 263 days)			1 August 1520; Kraków Son of Žygimantas the Old and Bona Sforza	(1) Elisabeth of Austria (2) Barbara Radziwiłł (3) Catherine of Austria	7 July 1572; Knyszyn; Aged 51	Son of Sigismund I
Union of Lublin signed in 1569 Poland and Lithuania are united into a single Commonwealth.

=== Grand Dukes of Lithuania within the Commonwealth (1569–1795) ===
Name	Portrait	Arms	Birth	Marriage(s)	Death	Claim	House
King of Poland and Grand Duke; Sigismund Augustus; Lithuanian: Žygimantas Augustas 1 July 1569 – 7 July 1572 (3 years, 7 days)			1 August 1520; Kraków Son of Žygimantas the Old and Bona Sforza	(3) Elisabeth of Austria; Barbara Radziwiłł; Catherine of Austria	7 July 1572; Knyszyn; Aged 51	Hereditary First monarch to introduce elective monarchy	Jagiellon
King of Poland and Grand Duke; Henry; Lithuanian: Henrikas Valua; 16 May 1573 – 12 May 1575 (1 year, 362 days)			19 September 1551; Fontainebleau Son of Henry II and Catherine de' Medici	(1) Louise of Lorraine	2 August 1589; Saint-Cloud; Aged 37	Elected Left Poland in June 1574 to succeed his brother in France Interregnum until 1575	Valois
Queen of Poland and Grand Duchess; Anna; Lithuanian: Ona Jogailaitė; 15 December 1575 – 19 August 1587 (de facto) (11 years, 248 days) – 9 September 1596 (de jure) (20 years, 270 days)			18 October 1523; Kraków Daughter of Sigismund I and Bona Sforza	(1) Stephen Báthory	9 September 1596; Warsaw; Aged 72	Elected co-monarch with Stephen Báthory Sole ruler until Báthory's arrival and coronation in May 1576 Ruled after husband's death until her nephew was elected	Jagiellon
King of Poland and Grand Duke; Stephen Báthory; Lithuanian: Steponas Batoras; 1 May 1576 – 12 December 1586 (10 years, 226 days)			27 September 1533; Szilágysomlyó (Șimleu Silvaniei) Son of Stephen Báthory of Somlyó and Catherine Telegdi	(1) Anna Jagiellon	12 December 1586; Grodno; Aged 53	Elected as co-monarch with Anna Jagiellon Previously Prince of Transylvania	Báthory
King of Poland and Grand Duke; Sigismund Vasa; Lithuanian: Zigmantas Vaza; 19 August 1587 – 30 April 1632 (44 years, 256 days)			20 June 1566; Gripsholm Son of John III of Sweden and Catherine Jagiellon	(1) Anne of Austria; 5 children (2) Constance of Austria; 7 children	30 April 1632; Warsaw; Aged 65	Elected, nephew of Anna Jagiellon Transferred capital from Kraków to Warsaw Hereditary King of Sweden until deposition in 1599	Vasa
King of Poland and Grand Duke; Władysław also Ladislaus IV; Lithuanian: Vladislovas Vaza; 8 November 1632 – 20 May 1648 (15 years, 195 days)			9 June 1595; Łobzów Son of Sigismund Vasa and Anne of Austria	(1) Cecilia Renata of Austria; 3 children (2) Marie Louise Gonzaga	20 May 1648; Merkinė; Aged 52	Elective succession Also titular King of Sweden and elected Tsar of Russia (1610–1613) when the Polish army captured Moscow	Vasa
King of Poland and Grand Duke; John Casimir; Lithuanian: Jonas Kazimieras Vaza; 20 November 1648 – 16 September 1668 (19 years, 302 days)			22 March 1609; Kraków Son of Sigismund Vasa and Constance of Austria	(1) Marie Louise Gonzaga; 2 children (2) Claudine Françoise Mignot (allegedly); 1 child?	16 December 1672; Nevers; Aged 63	Elective succession, succeeded half-brother Previously a cardinal Disputed with Charles X Gustav between 1655–1657 Titular King of Sweden Abdicated	Vasa
King of Poland and Grand Duke; Michael; Lithuanian: Mykolas Kaributas Višnioveckis; 19 June 1669 – 10 November 1673 (4 years, 145 days)			31 May 1640; Biały Kamień Son of Jeremi Wiśniowiecki and Gryzelda Konstancja Zamoyska	(1) Eleonora Maria of Austria, 1 child	10 November 1673; Lwów; Aged 33	Elected Born into nobility of mixed heritage, the son of a military commander and governor	Wiśniowiecki
King of Poland and Grand Duke; John Sobieski; Lithuanian: Jonas Sobieskis; 19 May 1674 – 17 June 1696 (22 years, 30 days)			17 August 1629; Olesko Son of Jakub Sobieski and Teofila Zofia	(1) Marie Casimire d'Arquien; 13 children	17 June 1696; Wilanów; Aged 66	Elected Born into nobility A successful military commander	Sobieski
King of Poland and Grand Duke; Augustus II; Lithuanian: Augustas II Stiprusis; 15 September 1697 – 1706 (1st reign, 9 years)			12 May 1670; Dresden Son of John George III and Princess Anna Sophie of Denmark	(1) Christiane Eberhardine of Brandenburg-Bayreuth; 1 child	1 February 1733; Warsaw; Aged 62	Elected Previously Elector and ruler of Saxony Dethroned by Stanislaus I in 1706 during the Great Northern War	Wettin
King of Poland and Grand Duke; Stanislaus I Lithuanian: Stanislovas I Leščinskis; 12 July 1704 – 8 July 1709 (1st reign, 4 years, 362 days)			20 October 1677; Lwów Son of Rafał Leszczyński and Anna Jabłonowska	(1) Catherine Opalińska; 2 children	23 February 1766; Lunéville; Aged 88	Usurped Nominated as ruler in 1704, crowned in 1705 and deposed predecessor in 1706 Exiled in 1709	Leszczyński
King of Poland and Grand Duke; Augustus II; Lithuanian: Augustas II Stiprusis; 8 July 1709 – 1 February 1733 (2nd reign, 23 years, 209 days)			12 May 1670; Dresden Son of John George III and Princess Anna Sophie of Denmark	(1) Christiane Eberhardine of Brandenburg-Bayreuth; 1 child	1 February 1733; Warsaw; Aged 62	Restored	Wettin
King of Poland and Grand Duke; Stanislaus I Lithuanian: Stanislovas I Leščinskis; 12 September 1733 – 26 January 1736 (2nd reign, 2 years, 137 days)			20 October 1677; Lwów Son of Rafał Leszczyński and Anna Jabłonowska	(1) Catherine Opalińska; 2 children	23 February 1766; Lunéville; Aged 88	Elected His election sparked the War of the Polish Succession Deposed by Augustus III in 1736	Leszczyński
King of Poland and Grand Duke; Augustus III; Lithuanian: Augustas III Saksas; 5 October 1733 – 5 October 1763 (30 years)			17 October 1696; Dresden Son of Augustus II the Strong and Christiane Eberhardine	(1) Maria Josepha of Austria; 16 children	5 October 1763; Dresden; Aged 66	Usurped Proclaimed King of Poland in 1733, crowned in 1734 Dethroned elected predecessor in 1736	Wettin
King of Poland and Grand Duke; Stanislaus II Augustus; Lithuanian: Stanislovas Augustas II Poniatovskis; 7 September 1764 – 25 November 1795 (31 years, 80 days)			17 January 1732; Wołczyn Son of Stanisław Poniatowski and Konstancja Czartoryska	Officially unmarried; (1) Elżbieta Szydłowska (allegedly) presumably several unacknowledged children	1 February 1798; Saint Petersburg; Aged 66	Elected Born into nobility Last King of Poland and Grand Duke of Lithuania, his reign ended in the Partitions of Poland	Poniatowski

=== General Confederation of the Kingdom of Poland (1812) ===
Name	Portrait	Arms	Birth	Marriage(s)	Death	Claim
Grand Duke; Frederick Augustus I Lithuanian: Frydrichas Augustas I 1 July 1812 – 14 December 1812 (167 days)			23 December 1750; Dresden Grandson of Augustus III of Poland and Maria Josepha of Austria	(1) Amalie of Zweibrücken-Birkenfeld; Princess Maria Augusta of Saxony	5 May 1827; Dresden; Aged 76	De jure restoration Offered by the Lithuanian Provisional Governing Commission

=== House of Urach (1918) ===
Name	Portrait	Arms	Birth	Marriage(s)	Death	Claim
King-elect; Mindaugas II; 11 July 1918 – 2 November 1918 (115 days)			30 May 1864; Monaco Son of Wilhelm, 1st Duke of Urach and Princess Florestine of Monaco	(1) Duchess Amalie in Bavaria; 9 children (2) Princess Wiltrud of Bavaria; No children	24 March 1928; Rapallo; Aged 63	De jure restoration Offered by the Lithuanian Council Offer withdrawn

== Timeline ==
Comparative reigns of Lithuanian monarchs

== Union of Lublin ==
In 1564, King of Poland and Grand Duke of Lithuania Sigismund II Augustus renounced his rights to the hereditary Lithuanian throne—the separate inauguration ceremony and insignia for Grand Duke of Lithuania were abolished. On 1 July 1569, Sigismund II Augustus united both of the countries into a single bi-federation, known as the Polish–Lithuanian Commonwealth, which existed for the next 226 years. The Union included constitutional changes such as creating a formal elective monarchy, to simultaneously reign over both parties.

Following the death of Sigismund II in 1572, a joint Polish–Lithuanian monarch was to be elected as in the Union of Lublin it was agreed that the title "Grand Duke of Lithuania" was to be held by a jointly elected monarch in the Election sejm on his accession to the throne, thus losing its former institutional significance. However the Union of Lublin guaranteed that the institution and the title "Grand Duke of Lithuania" would be preserved. The demand for a separate inauguration ceremony of the Grand Duke of Lithuania was raised by the nobles of the Grand Duchy of Lithuania (e.g. Mikołaj "the Red" Radziwiłł, Eustachy Wołłowicz, Jan Karol Chodkiewicz, Konstanty Ostrogski) during negotiations. It was not officially included in it, however. Nevertheless, before the 1576 Polish–Lithuanian royal election a congress of the Grand Duchy of Lithuania's nobles was held on 20 April 1576 in Grodno which adopted a Universal, signed by the participating Lithuanian nobles, which announced that if the delegates of the Grand Duchy of Lithuania were pressured by the Poles in the Election sejm, the Lithuanians would not be obliged by any oath to the Union of Lublin and would have the right to select a separate monarch.

On 29 May 1580, a ceremony was held in the Vilnius Cathedral during which bishop Merkelis Giedraitis presented Stephen Báthory (King of Poland since 1 May 1576) a luxuriously decorated sword and a hat adorned with pearls (both were sanctified by Pope Gregory XIII himself). While this ceremony manifested the sovereignty of the Grand Duchy of Lithuania and had the meaning of elevation of the new Grand Duke of Lithuania, this ignored the stipulations of the Union of Lublin.

During the Deluge of the Second Northern War, the Commonwealth temporarily disintegrated in 1655 when the magnates of the Grand Duchy of Lithuania signed the Union of Kėdainiai with the Swedish Empire and became its protectorate (Swedish Lithuania), with Charles X Gustav serving as Grand Duke of Lithuania. It was short-lived because Sweden lost the war. The Commonwealth permanently ceased to exist in 1795, following its third partition by the neighbouring powers, Prussia, Russia and Austria. Following the partitions, the lands of ethnic Lithuania were divided—Lithuania proper became a part of the Russian Empire while Sudovia became a part of the Kingdom of Prussia.

== History ==
=== Kingdom of Lithuania under Mindaugas I ===
As the conquests of Prussia by the Teutonic Order and of Livonia by the Livonian Brothers were coming to an end, both Catholic religious orders began posing an existential threat to then-pagan Lithuania. In response, Duke Mindaugas, who by then had managed to strengthen his grip in various Baltic and Slavic lands, sought to consolidate power and unite Lithuania into one political entity, convert to Christianity, and become king. In 1250 or 1251, he was baptised as a Roman Catholic. On 17 July 1251 Pope officially recognized Mindaugas as the King, thus establishing Christian Kingdom of Lithuania, and in 1253 probably in Vilnius or Novogrudok, he and his wife Morta were crowned King and Queen. Those events established a short-lived alliance with the Livonian Order and laid the basis for the international recognition of the newly created Kingdom of Lithuania as a Western country.

=== Attempts of coronation in the Grand Duchy of Lithuania ===
Some historical documents suggest that at the time of signing the Treaty of Salynas in 1398, Lithuanian nobles had acknowledged Vytautas as their King as a symbolic declaration of allegiance. Vytautas himself sought to officially establish his reign by coronation at least three times. All three attempts were unsuccessful because the political situation was much more complicated—by this point the Grand Duchy of Lithuania and the Kingdom of Poland were under a joint rule of Grand Duke of Lithuania and King of Poland Jogaila (Władysław II Jagiełło) with the Crown being in Kraków, Poland. As a consequence, the idea of a fully-fledged Lithuanian monarchy as well as Poland losing its influence over its neighbour was met with fierce resistance from the Polish nobles. The first time coronation was planned on 8 September 1430, but after one of the delegations that transported the crown learned that the first delegation was robbed on its way to Lithuania, they returned to Nuremberg. In the same year of October, Vytautas up until his death had planned his coronation at least two more times but with no success.

In 1526, the Lithuanian Council of Lords suggested King Sigismund I the Old to grant the Grand Duchy of Lithuania the status of a kingdom, but such a proposal was rejected by the ruling Jagiellonian dynasty.

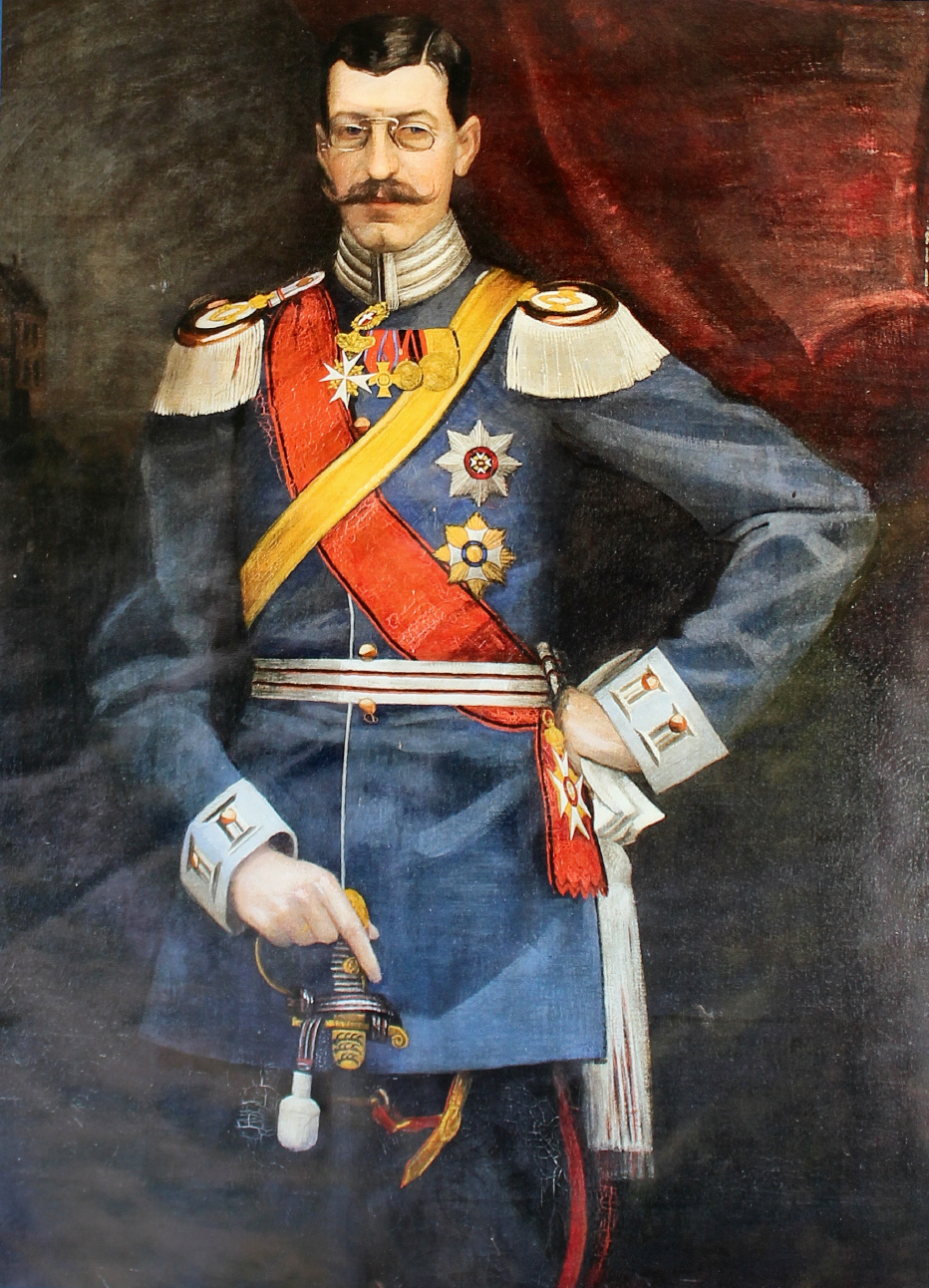
Wilhelm Karl von Urach (Mindaugas II)

=== Kingdom of Lithuania (1918) de jure under Mindaugas II ===
During the First World War, the German Empire wanted Lithuania proper to be annexed and become a part of either Prussia or Saxony, which for 123 years remained a part of the Russian Empire following the Third Partition of the Polish−Lithuanian Commonwealth in 1795.

In an attempt to avoid becoming a province but remain on good terms with Germany, the Council of Lithuania decided to establish a separate constitutional monarchy with Wilhelm von Urach as king, with his residence in Verkiai Palace. According to the twelve-point document resembling the rudiments of a Constitution, the Kingdom of Lithuania was supposed to have a bicameral legislature with a representative role for the monarch. Wilhelm von Urach was also presented with conditions such as: adopting the title of Mindaugas II; letting his children attend a Lithuanian school; only appointing courtiers, ministers and other high-ranking public officials who were Lithuanian citizens and speakers of Lithuanian, the country's official language; and who would not leave the state for more than two months per year without the permission of the government.

As the war ended, it became clear that Germany was losing. On 5 October 1918, in the Reichstag, the new Chancellor of Germany Maximilian of Baden announced that his state acknowledged the right of nations to self-determination and supported their efforts to become independent countries. Soon afterwards, Germany expressed its official support for the independence of Lithuania. Diplomats of France had also unambiguously proclaimed to the Council of Lithuania and the Parliament that having a monarch of German descent would be seen as unacceptable. On 2 November 1918, as it became apparent that King-elect Mindaugas himself was hesitant to arrive in Lithuania for his coronation due to political unrest, the Council decided to abandon the idea of being a satellite monarchy and establish a fully independent republic instead.

=== Modernity ===
Although there are no monarchist parties in modern Lithuania, there is a monarchist movement, which is in favor of re-establishing the short-lived monarchy of 1918. The movement alongside the Lithuanian Royal Union of Nobility believe that the current Lithuanian state did not undergo all of the complicated and necessary procedures to truly abolish the Lithuanian monarchy. According to the senate marshal of the organization "Palace of the Kingdom of Lithuania", Stanislovas Švedarauskas:

Can we present the specific date when the Kingdom of Lithuania of the Middle Ages ceased to exist and when did the Lithuanian 20th-century constitutional monarchy end? In the words of historians, when Mindaugas I died in 1263, the Kingdom had disappeared as well. However, after almost 100 years, in the 14th century, Gediminas would send his letters proclaiming to be "King of Lithuanians and many Ruthenians." In November 1918, the State Council left the question of Mindaugas II to the Constituent Assembly. And while it is true that the latter declared Lithuania to be a democratic republic on 15 May 1920, I have never heard of the Constituent Assembly officially denouncing the State Council's declaration of 11 July 1918, which called to create a constitutional monarchy in Lithuania and invite Mindaugas II to take his throne.

Political commentator Česlovas Iškauskas responded:

In 1918, Germany exerted great influence. But now the idea of re-establishing the constitutional monarchy as well as the activities of the "Palace of the Kingdom of Lithuania" to me seems like a game when you have nothing better to do. At the moment Lithuania has much more important issues—it needs to think how to withstand current threats, not about a new monarchy.

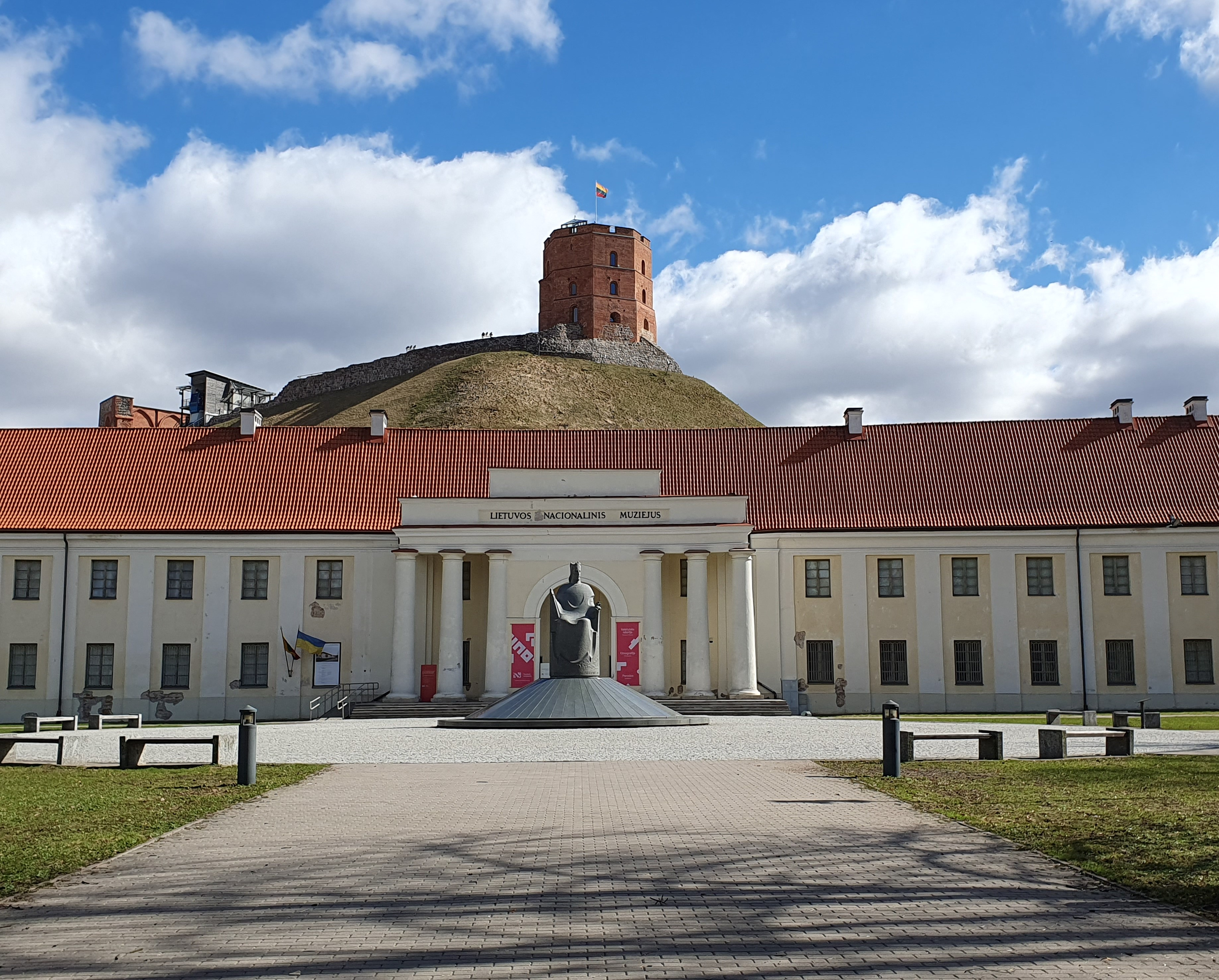
King Mindaugas Monument in front of the National Museum of Lithuania and Gediminas' Tower in Vilnius

A grandson of Wilhelm von Urach (Mindaugas II), Prince Inigo von Urach, who is currently not Duke of Urach, claims that according to Almanach de Gotha he remains to be a rightful claimant to the Lithuanian throne and is willing to become King of Lithuania, if the nation wants him to. To quote him from an interview for Lithuanian National Radio and Television (LRT), "It's not my thing to decide it [the idea of officially being crowned King], that's the thing of the population here, of the citizens of Lithuania. It's not my thing [to decide]. But I promise—if they want me, I would be ready for this job." He also mentioned that Wilhelm von Urach expressed his will in his Testament of "keeping the claim of the throne" of Lithuania as well as Monaco.

== See also ==
List of Lithuanian royal consorts

List of heads of state of Lithuania
