= Lithuania Ascending =

History by Stephen Christopher Rowell, 1994

Lithuania Ascending: A Pagan Empire within East-Central Europe, 1295–1345
- Cover of the book
- Author: Stephen Christopher Rowell
- Original title: Lithuania Ascending: A Pagan Empire within East-Central Europe, 1295–1345
- Translator: Osvaldas Aleksa (Lithuanian); Alesʹ Mikus (Belarusian); Grzegorz Smółka (Polish)
- Language: English, Lithuanian, Belarusian, Polish
- Series: Cambridge Studies in Medieval Life and Thought
- Subject: History of Lithuania
- Genre: History book
- Published: 1994 (English), 2001 (Lithuanian), 2015 (Belarus), 2017 (Poland)
- Publisher: Cambridge University Press (English), Baltos lankos (Lithuanian), Medysont (Belarusian), Napoleon V (Polish)
- Publication place: United Kingdom, Lithuania, Belarus, Poland
- Pages: 375 (English), 381 (Lithuanian), 423 (Belarusian), 375 (Polish)
- ISBN: 978-0-521-45011-9 (English); 978-9955-00-071-6 (Lithuanian); 978-985-7085-89-7 (Belarusian); 978-83-65855-28-2 (Polish)
- Website: Cambridge.org

Lithuania Ascending: A Pagan Empire within East-Central Europe, 1295–1345 (Lithuanian: Iš viduramžių ūkų kylanti Lietuva: pagonių imperija Rytų ir Vidurio Europoje, 1295–1345) is a book by Stephen Christopher Rowell, published in 1994 by Cambridge University Press. It covers the history of Lithuania between 1295 and 1345, centering on the expansion of pagan Lithuania into Eastern and Central Europe.

It was republished in 1995, 1997, and 2000. Osvaldas Aleksa translated the book into the Lithuanian language, and it was published in 2001 by Baltos lankos.

== Reception ==
In a review published in Speculum, the Polish medievalist Piotr Górecki described the book as a major scholarly contribution that helped place Lithuanian history within the mainstream of Anglophone medieval studies. He praised its clear style, thematic organization, and effective integration of political, religious, and diplomatic history, while also noting the author’s evident sympathy for the subject combined with a generally restrained tone.

The monograph has been criticized by the Belarusian historian Aliaksandr Kraucevich for alleged methodological flaws, factual inaccuracies, and a pronounced bias toward the Lithuanian element in the history of the Grand Duchy of Lithuania. Aliaksandr Kraucevich argued that Rowell’s concept of a “pagan empire” is contradicted by the book’s own evidence, which instead points to the declining role of paganism and the active patronage of Christianity by rulers such as Vytenis and Gediminas. He also maintained that the polity of 1295–1345 had not yet developed true imperial characteristics.

This interpretation has also been questioned by the Ukrainian reviewer Bohdan Zavitiy, writing in Krytyka. He argued that Rowell overstates the role of pagan Lithuanians in state formation while downplaying the early importance of the Ruthenian population, as well as evidence for the peaceful integration of Ruthenian lands.

== Bibliography ==
- Górecki, Piotr (1998). "Review of Lithuania Ascending: A Pagan Empire Within East-Central Europe, 1295-1345". Speculum. 73 (2): 588–591. doi:10.2307/2887238. JSTOR 2887238.
- Краўцэвіч, Аляксандр (2020). Папяровы імперыялізм, або ці была Літва ў XIVст. „паганскай імперыяй”? [Paper imperialism, or was Lithuania a "pagan empire" in the 14th century?]. Гадавік Цэнтра Беларускіх Студыяў (in Belarusian) (6). Варшава: 237–246.
- Завітій, Богдан (2016). Стэфан Крыстафер Роўэл. Уздым Літвы: Паганская імперыя ў Цэнтральнай і Усходняй Еўропе, 1295–1345 [Stephen Christopher Rowell. Lithuania Ascending: A Pagan Empire within East-Central Europe, 1295–1345]. Krytyka (in Ukrainian) (9–10 (227–228)): 28.
