= Vainius =

Vainius or Voin (died between 1338 and 1342) was the Lithuanian Prince of Polotsk from 1328 to his death. Very little is known about Vainius, brother of Gediminas, Grand Duke of Lithuania. He is mentioned in written sources in 1324 for the first time. In 1328 he, already as Prince of Polotsk, signed a treaty with the Livonian Order and Novgorod. His only known son Liubartas died in 1342 during fights with the Livonian Order.

== See also ==
- Family of Gediminas – family tree of Vainius
- Gediminids

Preceded by Daumantas	Prince of Polatsk; 1315 – 1342	Succeeded by Narimantas
