= Manvydas =

Prince of Kernavė and Slonim

Manvydas or Monwid (Russian: Монтивид; died in 1348?) was the eldest son of Gediminas, Grand Duke of Lithuania, and inherited Kernavė and Slonim after his father's death in 1341. Nothing else is known about his life. Matthias of Neuenburg mentioned that two sons of Gediminas perished in the Battle of Strėva in February 1348. One was Narimantas and the other is believed to be Manvydas.

== See also ==
- Family of Gediminas – family tree of Manvydas
- Gediminids
