= Family of Gediminas =

Noble family

Gediminas
- Coat of arms of the Gediminas dynasty

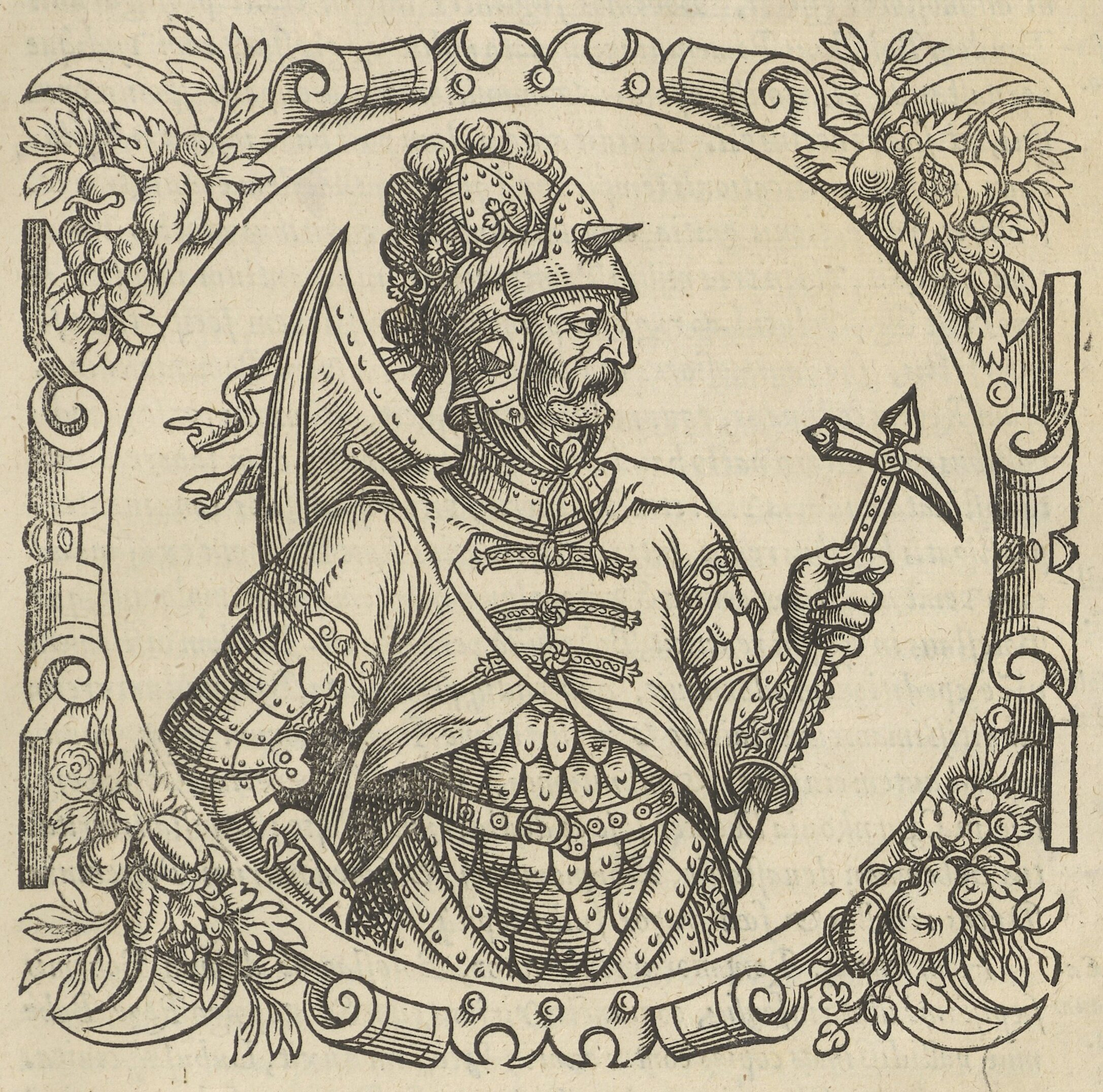
- Vytenis, Grand Duke of Lithuania about 1295–1315
- Current region: Lithuania
- Founder: Gediminas, Grand Duke of Lithuania

The family of Gediminas is a group of family members of Gediminas, Grand Duke of Lithuania (c. 1275–1341), who interacted in the 14th century. The family included the siblings, children, and grandchildren of the Grand Duke and played the pivotal role in the history of Lithuania for the period as the Lithuanian nobility had not yet acquired its influence. Gediminas was also the forefather of the Gediminid dynasty, which ruled the Grand Duchy of Lithuania from 1310s or 1280s to 1572.

Gediminas' origins are unclear, but recent research suggests that Skalmantas (Skolomend), an otherwise unknown historical figure, was Gediminas' grandfather or father and could be considered the dynasty's founder. Because none of his brothers or sisters had known heirs, Gediminas, who sired at least twelve children, had the advantage in establishing sovereignty over his siblings. Known for his diplomatic skills, Gediminas arranged his children's marriages to suit the goals of his foreign policy: his sons consolidated Lithuanian power within the Grand Duchy of Lithuania, while his daughters established or strengthened alliances with the rulers of areas in modern-day Russia, Ukraine and Poland.

The relationships among Gediminas' children were generally harmonious, with the notable exception of Jaunutis, who was deposed in 1345 by his brothers Algirdas and Kęstutis. These two brothers went on to provide a celebrated example of peaceful power-sharing. However, Gediminas' many grandchildren and their descendants engaged in power struggles that continued well into the 15th century. Gediminas' grandchildren converted Lithuania to Christianity and inaugurated the first personal union with Poland.

== Origins ==
Because written sources of the era are scarce, Gediminas' ancestry, early life, and assumption of the title of Grand Duke in ca. 1316 are obscure and continue to be the subject of scholarly debate. Various theories have claimed that Gediminas was either his predecessor Grand Duke Vytenis' son, his brother, his cousin, or his hostler. For several centuries only two versions of his origins circulated. Chronicles—written long after Gediminas' death by the Teutonic Knights, a long-standing enemy of Lithuania—claimed that Gediminas was a hostler to Vytenis; according to these chronicles, Gediminas killed his master and assumed the throne. Another version introduced in the Lithuanian Chronicles, which also appeared long after Gediminas' death, proclaimed that Gediminas was Vytenis' son. However, the two men were almost the same age, making this relationship unlikely. In 1868, a letter issued by the Council of Riga in 1323 was published that contained a small note mentioning Vytenis as "the brother and predecessor" of Gediminas. After the letter came to light, textbooks almost universally represented Vytenis and Gediminas as brothers. However, historian Tomas Baranauskas believes the word "brother" has been interpreted too literally, and that the two were in fact cousins.

Grand Duke Vytenis' origins are relatively well-established; he was the son of Butvydas, who was Grand Duke of Lithuania from 1291 to 1295. No consensus exists about the identity of Butvydas' father. While some genealogies give Traidenis as the ancestor, this has been described as unlikely: the later marriage of Gediminas' daughter Eufemija and Traidenis' great-grandson Boleslaw-Yuri would have violated canon law, since the two would have been related by blood, and this violation would likely have been noticed by the pope.

Recent research indicates that Gediminids' ancestor may have been Skalmantas. In 1974 historian Jerzy Ochmański noted that Zadonshchina, a poem from the end of the 14th century, contains a line in which two sons of Algirdas name their ancestors: "We are two brothers – sons of Algirdas, and grandsons of Gediminas, and great-grandsons of Skalmantas." This discovery led to the belief that Skalmantas was the long-sought ancestor of the Gediminids. Ochmański posited that the poem skipped the generation represented by Butvydas, and jumped back to the unknown ancestor. Baranauskas disagrees, believing Skalmantas was Butvydas' brother rather than his father, and that Vytenis and Gediminas were therefore cousins.

== Siblings ==
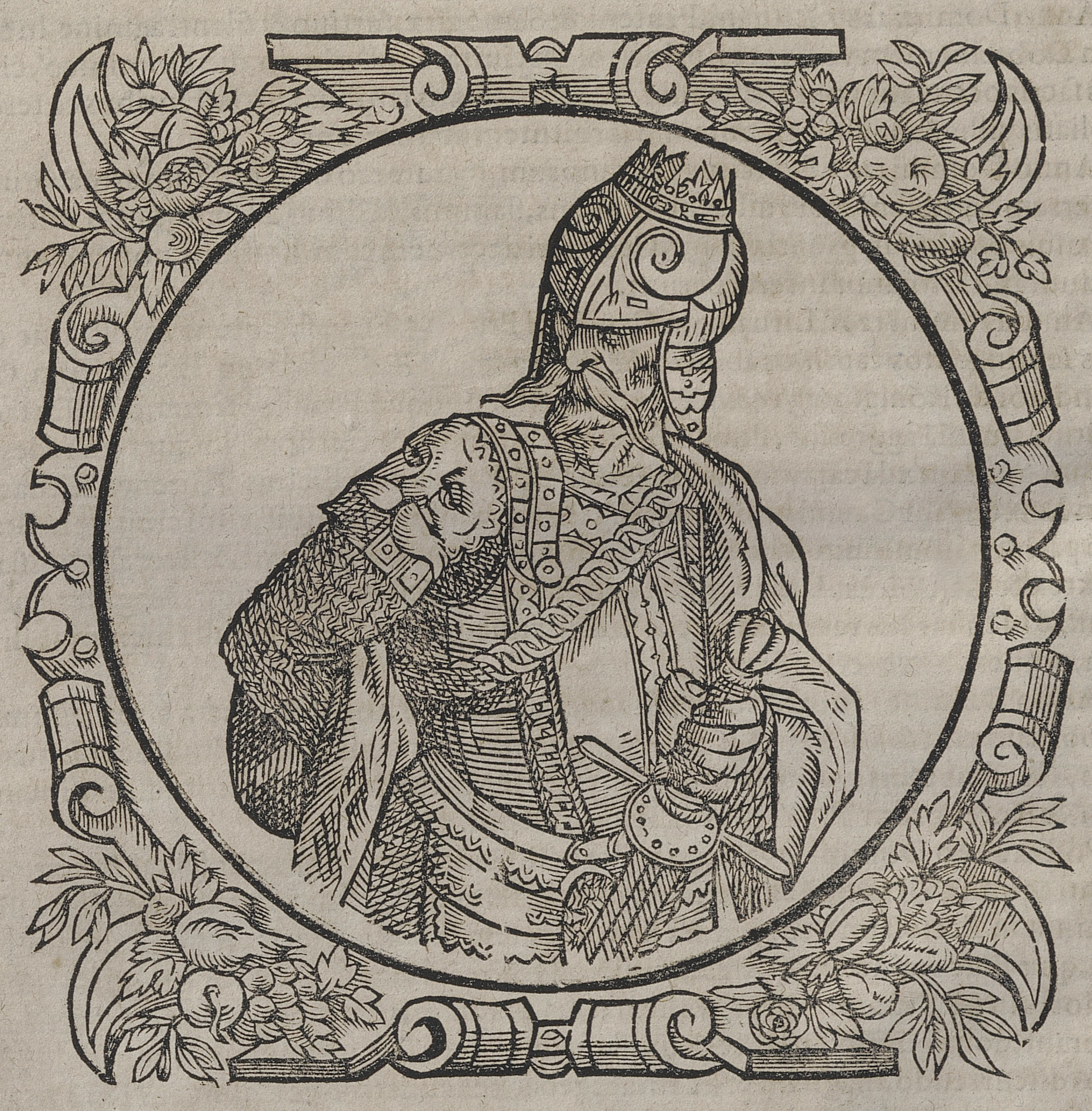
Imaginative portrait of Gediminas from the chronicle of Alexander Guagnini. This portrait is still used today as an illustration in history books.

It is known that Gediminas, born about 1275, had one sister (or possibly two, see below for the wife of Andrei of Kozelsk) and several brothers: Vainius, Fiodor of Kiev, possibly Vytenis, and possibly Margiris. If Vytenis, who was Grand Duke of Lithuania from about 1295 to 1315, was indeed Gediminas' brother, he was probably the eldest son. Historians recognize one son of Grand Duke Vytenis, Žvelgaitis, who may have died before his father. In 1310 Žvelgaitis, already a mature man, led an army to nearby Livonia in modern-day Latvia and Estonia. After Vytenis died in about 1315, Gediminas became the Grand Duke. There are no sources indicating that Vytenis' brothers or other family members advanced competing claims.

Vainius first appears in written sources in 1324. In 1326, as Duke of Polatsk, he signed a treaty with the Livonian Order and Novgorod. Scholars place his death sometime between 1338 and 1342. Vainius' only known son, Liubko, died in 1342 during a battle with the Livonian Order.

Fiodor, whose relationship with Gediminas was not established until the 20th century, was the longest-lived brother, surviving until at least 1362. In about 1325, with help from Gediminas, he became a duke of Kiev. Fiodor was baptized in the Eastern Orthodox rite and his pagan name is unknown. Kiev was still under the influence of the Golden Horde, and Fiodor acknowledged fealty to the Horde's Khan. This subordination lasted until 1363, when Gediminas' son Algirdas soundly defeated the Horde in the Battle of Blue Waters. Scholarly opinion had long considered Fiodor a Rurikid, rather than a Lithuanian, because of his Christian name. In 1916, however, a list of property belonging to Theognostus, a deceased Metropolitan of Moscow, and compiled in the 1330s, was published; among the items listed were two silver cups gifted by "Fiodor, brother of Gediminas".

Margiris, the defender of Pilėnai, is often suggested as the most likely candidate for the fourth brother. The chronicles of Hermann de Wartberge mention that in 1329 Gediminas and two of his brothers raided Livonia. By that time Vytenis was already dead and Fiodor was probably occupied with establishing himself in Kiev. One of these two brothers must then have been Vainius; the identity of the other still puzzles historians. Alvydas Nikžentaitis suggests that he was Margiris because sources attest to his high status and wealth. Sources mention one son of Margiris, who was captured by the Teutonic Knights soon after his father's suicide in 1336 and did not return.

The only direct written mention of Gediminas' sister is a legend describing the murder of two Franciscan friars who came to Vilnius to spread Christianity. This legend was first presented in Chronica XXIV Generalium, a chronicle written before 1369. The events probably took place around 1340, and some eyewitnesses could still have been alive when the chronicle was written. According to the legend Friar Ulrich's preaching angered townspeople. He and his companion, Martin, were seized and brought before Gediminas, who ordered the friars killed. Ulrich was tortured and his body tossed into a river. Martin's body was rescued by Gediminas' sister, an Orthodox nun. She buried Martin at the monastery where she lived. The legend was possibly as the basis for the legend of 14 Franciscan martyrs of Vilnius, first recorded in the Bychowiec Chronicle.

== Wives ==
It is uncertain how many wives Gediminas had. The Bychowiec Chronicle mentions three wives: Vida from Courland; Olga from Smolensk; and Jewna from Polotsk, who was Eastern Orthodox and died in 1344 or 1345. Most modern historians and reference works say Gediminas' wife was Jewna, dismissing Vida and Olga as fictitious, since no sources other than this chronicle mention the other two wives. The historian S. C. Rowell argues that Gediminas' wife was a local pagan duchess, on the grounds that his marriage to a princess from a neighboring land would have been noted in other contemporary sources, and that the reliability of the Bychowiec Chronicle has been questioned.

An argument has been advanced that Gediminas had two wives, one pagan and another Orthodox. This case is supported only by the Jüngere Hochmeisterchronik, a late 15th-century chronicle, mentioning Narimantas as half-brother to Algirdas. Other historians support this claim by arguing this would explain Gediminas' otherwise mysterious designation of a middle son, Jaunutis, as his succession would be understandable if Jaunutis were the first-born son of Gediminas and a second wife.

== Children and grandchildren ==
Because none of Gediminas' siblings had strong heirs, Gediminas and his children were in a favorable position to assume and consolidate power in the Grand Duchy. Gediminas had at least five daughters and seven sons, whose shrewd marriages helped to consolidate and expand the Grand Duchy's influence to areas east and west of Lithuania. Those marriages speak to Gediminas' diplomatic talent in building alliances with the neighboring states that shared his goals to destroy the Teutonic Order and contain the growing power of Moscow and Poland. The marriages of Gediminas' sons helped to consolidate the dynasty's power over various territories already within the Grand Duchy, while his daughters' and granddaughters' marriages worked to strengthen Lithuanian relationships with neighboring powers.

=== Daughters ===
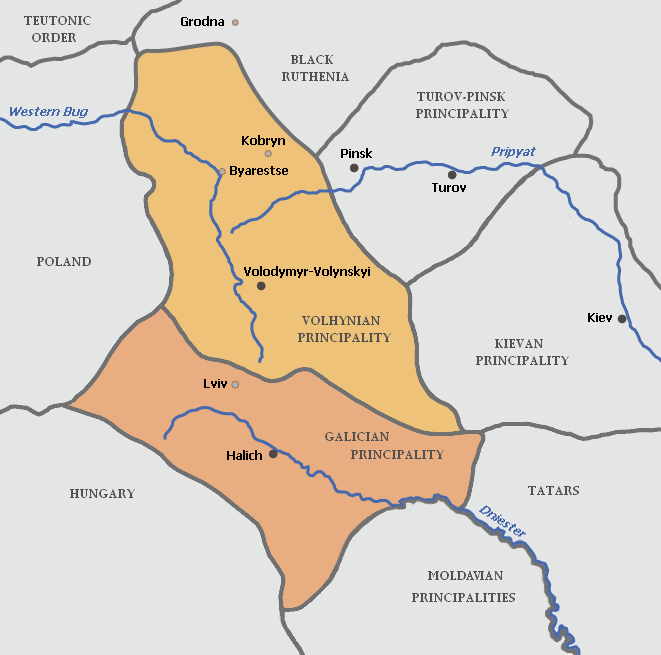
Map of Galicia–Volhynia. Two of Gediminas' children, Liubartas and Eufemija, were involved in succession disputes over Galicia–Volhynia

In 1320 Maria married Dmitri of Tver, ruler of a Rus' principality. The marriage took place soon after Mikhail Yaroslavich, Dmitri's father, was killed; his sons were searching for strong allies against Yury of Moscow, their principal competitor for the throne of Vladimir and All Rus'. After 1327 Lithuania began to supplant Tver as Moscow's chief rival for supremacy in the Rus'. When Tver sought to rival Moscow, it needed an alliance with Lithuania. Dmitri was killed in 1325 and Maria never remarried. Maria's brother-in-law, Alexander I, nevertheless maintained friendly relationships with the Grand Duchy of Lithuania and his daughter Uliana married Algirdas, the son of Gediminas, who continued the Gediminid line. The cooperation between Lithuania and Tver lasted well into the 15th century.

Aldona (baptized as Ona or Anna; her pagan name is known only from the writings of the 16th century chronicler Maciej Stryjkowski) married Casimir III of Poland, son of Władysław I of Poland, when he was 15 or 16 years old. The marriage took place on either 30 April or 16 October 1325, and was a purely political maneuver to strengthen the Polish–Lithuanian coalition against the Teutonic Knights (an alliance foreshadowing the Union of Krewo in 1385 and the Union of Lublin in 1569, with the latter resulting in a stable and powerful new state, the Polish–Lithuanian Commonwealth). This preliminary coalition was short-lived, collapsing in about 1330, but there is no evidence of military conflict between Poland and Lithuania while Aldona was alive.

The marriage into the Lithuanian dynasty that had ruled since about 1289 might have lent legitimacy to the rule of Władysław I of the Piast dynasty, who was crowned in 1320, replacing the Přemyslid dynasty. But Aldona died unexpectedly at the end of May 1339 and was buried in Kraków. Aldona had two daughters: Cunigunde (d. 1357) married Louis VI the Roman, the son of Louis IV, Holy Roman Emperor, and Elisabeth (d. 1361) married Duke Bogislaw V of Pomerania, an area in modern-day Germany and Poland. Elisabeth's daughter, Elizabeth of Pomerania, was the fourth wife of Charles IV, Holy Roman Emperor.

Gediminas' daughter Elzbieta married Wacław of Płock, one of the dukes of Masovia in modern-day eastern Poland. Her second name is recorded in writings by Maciej Stryjkowski as Danmila and Teodor Narbutt as Damila. It has been suggested these names are misread versions of Danutė, a name derived from Daniel. Another interpretation is that historians confused Danutė of Lithuania, daughter of Kęstutis, with Elzbieta. As an alliance, the marriage was significant because passages to and from western Europe had to go through Masovia; it can be seen as an attempt to revive Grand Duke Traidenis' and his daughter Gaudemunda's link with Masovia in the 1270s. The marriage's importance is attested by Elzbieta's dowry: 720 Kraków silver marks and nine marks of gold – three times more than an ordinary recorded dowry of the time. This marriage probably took place about 1316, when Gediminas supported Wacław during a civil war in the divided Duchy of Masovia. After Wacław's death in 1336, Elzbieta managed her own wealth. She is mentioned for the last time in 1361, when her brother Kęstutis escaped from Marienburg and sought refuge at his sister's house; historians put her date of death at around 1364. In 1337 Elzbieta's daughter Anna, first mentioned in late 1323, married Henry of Żagań, in modern-day western Poland. Her son Bolesław III or Bolko died without a male heir in 1351 and his land was divided among other dukes.

Eufemija (also known as Marija, Ofka, and Anka) married Bolesław Jerzy II of Galicia, in modern-day Ukraine, in 1331. The marriage was engineered in 1323 when the brothers Lev and Andrew of Galicia were slain without leaving heirs. Instead of replacing them with his own son Liubartas and risking a war with Poland, Gediminas forged a compromise with Władysław I of Poland. Both parties agreed to install Bolesław, cousin of Władysław I and nephew of Gediminas' son-in-law Wacław of Płock, with the marriage to take place later. Bolesław at the time was fourteen years old. In this way the war for control of Galicia–Volhynia was postponed until after Bolesław's poisoning in 1340; control of the area was not stabilized until 1370. According to Teodor Narbutt, Eufemija was drowned beneath the ice of the Vistula River on 5 February 1342 in order to keep her out of the succession disputes.

Aigusta was baptized as Anastasia in order to marry Simeon of Moscow in 1333; he became Grand Prince of Moscow in 1341. There is no direct evidence that she was a daughter of Gediminas, but because the marriage was high-profile, most historians have concluded that she was a member of Gediminas' family. The marriage had great potential because Lithuania and Moscow were fierce rivals for supremacy in Ruthenia, but conflicts broke out again in 1335, just two years after the marriage. Her two sons Vasilei and Konstantin did not survive infancy; her daughter Vasilisa married Mikhail Vasilevich of Kashin, a Tverite prince opposing Lithuania. Her brother Jaunutis sought her help when he was deposed by Algirdas in 1345. Immediately before her death on 11 March 1345 Aigusta became a nun. She was buried within the Moscow Kremlin at a monastic church whose construction she had sponsored.

It is possible that Gediminas had two more daughters. According to Maciej Stryjkowski, one of Gediminas' daughters was married to David of Hrodna, his favorite war leader. However, some historians disagree with the conclusion that David was Gediminas' son-in-law, expressing skepticism about the reliability of Stryjkowski's sources. The existence of another daughter, or possibly another sister, has been hypothesized based on the list of Metropolitan Theognostus' property published in 1916. The list contains a note describing Andrei Mstislavich, Duke of Kozelsk (ruled ca. 1320 — 1339), as Gediminas' son-in-law. On the other hand, the Ruthenian word ziat' (зять) can mean either "son-in-law" or "sister's husband". Hence Andrei of Kozelsk could have been Gediminas' brother-in-law.

=== Sons ===
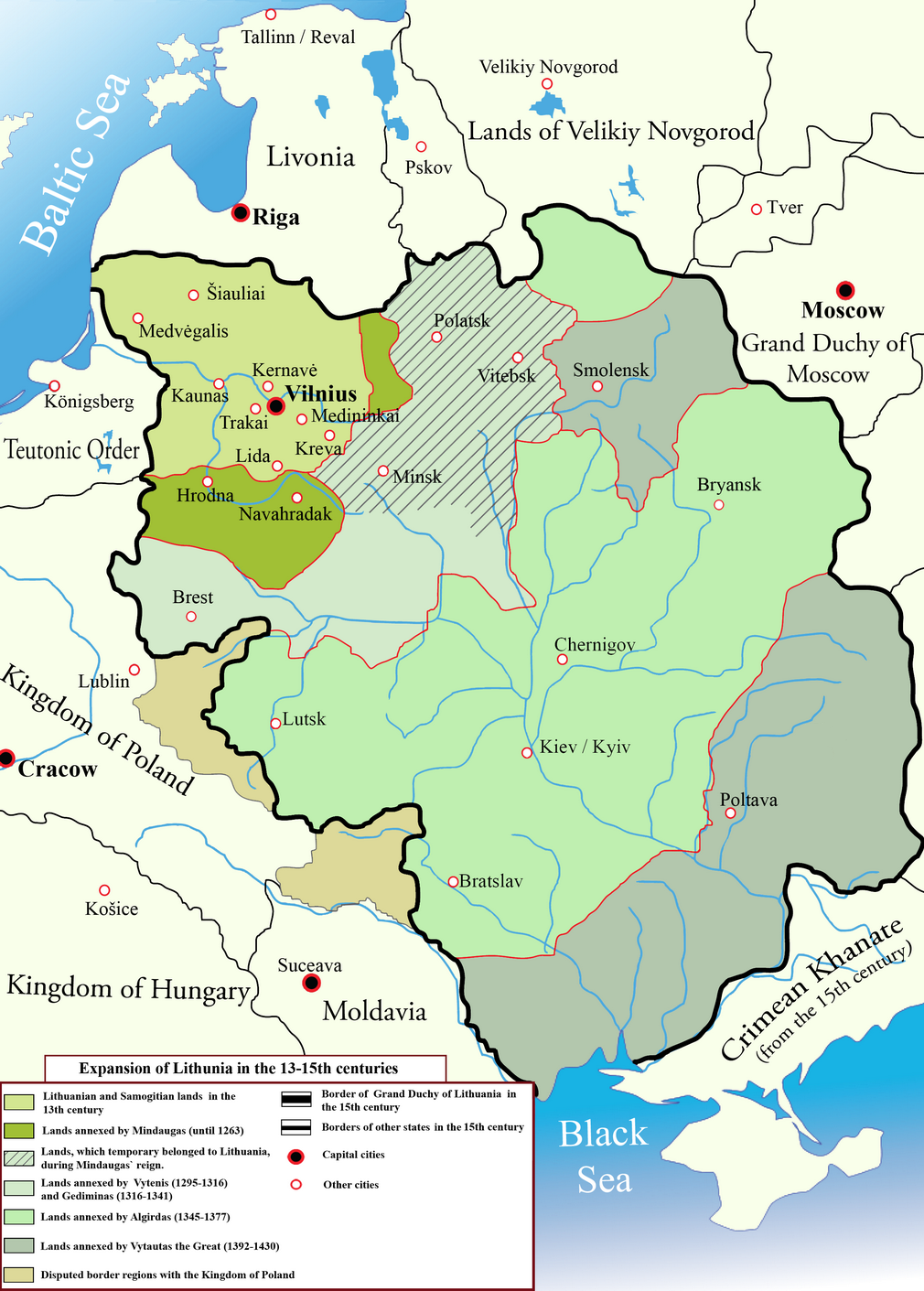
Expansion of the Lithuanian state during the 13th-15th centuries

The chronicle of John of Winterthur contains a reference to Gediminas' eight sons. The names of seven sons can be found in various written sources, while the identity of the eighth remains disputed. Alvydas Nikžentaitis suggests that this son was the Duke of Trakai who perished in 1337 in the attack on Bayernburg. Duke of Trakai was an important position held either by the Grand Duke himself or his second-in-command. Therefore, 18th- and 19th-century historians believed that it was Gediminas himself who died at Bayernburg. Nikžentaitis further postulates that the name of the unknown son might have been Vytautas, as records mention a young and powerful Yuri, son of Vytautas and deputy of Andrei, son of Algirdas. Yuri died in 1348. His high position in youth could easily be accounted for by being a grandson of Gediminas. However, others dispute these theories, arguing that the note in John of Winterthur's chronicle was misinterpreted.

It is unclear why, but Jaunutis, a middle son not mentioned in any written sources before the coup d'état accomplished by his brothers, was designated by Gediminas as his heir in Vilnius and consequently became the Grand Duke. His brother Kęstutis, Duke of Trakai, was assisting him in Samogitia. Despite help from Narimantas, Jaunutis was deposed by his brothers Algirdas and Kęstutis in 1345, just four years after Gediminas' death. Jaunutis tried, but failed, to solicit help from his brother-in-law Simeon of Russia and was baptized as Iwan in the process. He was forced to reconcile with Algirdas and in compensation received the Duchy of Zasłaŭje, which he ruled until his death in 1366.

Several sons of Gediminas continued his male line, but it was Algirdas who continued the main Gediminid line. Before deposing his brother Jaunutis in 1345, he ruled Kreva and, despite remaining pagan, married Maria, a daughter of the last prince of Vitebsk. After 1345 he became the Grand Duke of Lithuania and shared his power with his brother Kęstutis. Their successful collaboration is celebrated in Lithuanian historiography, and gave rise to a much debated theory that a tradition of co-rule or diarchy in Lithuania was customary and arose as early as 1285. The Grand Duchy experienced its greatest expansion during their reign. While Algirdas was mostly active in the east, Kęstutis occupied himself by managing the Duchy's interactions with the Teutonic Knights, Poland, and other western European entities. In 1350 Algirdas contracted a second marriage with Uliana of Tver; he chose their son Jogaila as the next Grand Duke. In 1385 Jogaila opened a new chapter in the history of Lithuania by converting the country to Christianity and signing a personal union with Poland, becoming King of Poland. This Polish–Lithuanian union, in various forms, survived until the third partition of the Polish–Lithuanian Commonwealth in 1795. Jogaila's branch of the Gediminids is known as the Jagiellon dynasty.

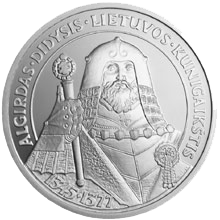
Commemorative silver coin (50 litas) with a modern portrait of Algirdas, Grand Duke of Lithuania from 1345 to 1377

Kęstutis, Duke of Trakai, despite exercising considerable autonomy while controlling the western provinces of the duchy, was loyal to Algirdas and acknowledged his superiority. Kęstutis was a devoted pagan and dedicated his life to defending Lithuania from the Teutonic Knights. A popular romantic legend arose about his marriage to the pagan priestess Birutė of Palanga. They had seven or eight children, including Vytautas the Great. After Algirdas' death in 1377, his son Jogaila became the Grand Duke. At first Kęstutis and his son Vytautas acknowledged Jogaila's rule, but after Jogaila signed the controversial Treaty of Dovydiškės with the Teutonic Knights, Kęstutis seized Vilnius and became the Grand Duke in late 1381. In August 1382 he was imprisoned in Kreva and died there. Vytautas continued his fight for supremacy, and the conflicts between the descendants of Algirdas and Kęstutis lasted well into the 15th century.

Manvydas was the eldest son of Gediminas and inherited the territories of Kernavė and Slonim from his father. Little is known about him, and he died soon after Gediminas. It is believed that he was killed in the Battle of Strėva in 1348 along with his brother Narimantas.

Narimantas was the second son of Gediminas. He was baptized as Gleb and went on to rule Pinsk, Polotsk, and – as his patrimony by invitation of Novgorod's nobles – Ladoga, Oreshek and Korela. He initiated a tradition of Lithuanian mercenary service north of Novgorod on the Swedish border that lasted until Novgorod's fall to Moscow in 1477 and helped keep Moscow at bay. In 1345 Narimantas became the strongest supporter of his deposed brother Jaunutis and went to Jani Beg, Khan of the Golden Horde, to ask for support against Algirdas and Kęstutis. There are rumors that Narimantas married a Tatar princess, but they lack credibility. After a few years the brothers reconciled, and it is believed that Narimantas led the Battle of Strėva in the name of Algirdas and died there. He left behind three to five sons who founded Russian princely families, including Kurakins and Golitsyns.

Karijotas was baptized as Mikhail and inherited Navahrudak in Black Ruthenia. In 1348 he was sent by Algirdas to Khan Jani Beg to negotiate a coalition against the Teutonic Knights, but was handed over to Moscow for ransom. He died about 1363. It is uncertain how many children he had: the number varies between four and nine.

Liubartas (baptized Dymitr) was Gediminas' youngest son. In the early 1320s he married a daughter of Andrew of Galicia and ruled Lutsk in eastern Volhynia. After Andrew's and his brother Lev of Galicia's deaths about 1323, Galicia–Volhynia experienced a power vacuum. Rather than promoting Liubartas and risking a war with Poland, Gediminas married his daughter Eufemija to Boleslaw-Yuri II of Galicia. War with Poland was thereby postponed until 1340. The Galicia–Volhynia Wars were settled after 1370, when Poland received Galicia, while Lithuania retained Volhynia. Liubartas died around 1385, having ruled Volhynia for roughly sixty years. He had three sons.

== Graphic representation ==
Skalmantas?

Butegeidis
Grand Duke of Lithuania

Butvydas?
Grand Duke of Lithuania

Fiodor*
Duke of Kiev

Vainius
Duke of Polatsk

Vytenis
Grand Duke of Lithuania

Gediminas
Grand Duke of Lithuania

Margiris?
Duke of Samogitia

NN daughter?

Liubka

Žvelgaitis

NN son

Maria*
Duchess of Tver

Aldona
Baptized: Ona
Queen of Poland

Elzbieta*
Duchess of Płock

Eufemija
Baptized: Marija
Duchess of Galicia

Aigusta
Baptized: Anastasia
Duchess of Moscow

NN daughter?
Duchess of Pskov?
Duchess of Kozelsk?

2 daughters

2 children

3 children

Vytautas?
Duke of Trakai?

Manvydas
Prince of Slonim and Kernavė

Narimantas
Baptized: Gleb
Duke of Pinsk

Algirdas
Grand Duke of Lithuania

Kęstutis
Grand Duke of Lithuania

Jaunutis
Baptized: Iwan
Grand Duke of Lithuania

Karijotas
Baptized: Mikhail
Duke of Navahrudak

Liubartas
Baptized: Dymitr
Duke of Volhynia

1 son

3, 4, or 5 sons

22 children

7 or 8 children

2 sons

4 to 10 children

3 sons

* Pagan name unknown; Christian (baptismal) name provided

Main sources:

- Nikžentaitis, Alvydas (1989). Gediminas (in Lithuanian). Vilnius: Vyriausioji enciklopedijų redakcija. pp. 7–16.
- Rowell, S. C. (1994). Lithuania Ascending: A Pagan Empire Within East-Central Europe, 1295–1345. Cambridge Studies in Medieval Life and Thought: Fourth Series. Cambridge University Press. pp. xxxii–xxxviii. ISBN 978-0-521-45011-9.

== See also ==
- House of Mindaugas
- Palemonids – legendary dynasty related to Polemon II of Pontus, a client king of Roman empire who allegedly settled in Lithuania
- Gediminids
- Gediminas' Tower
- Columns of Gediminas
