= Fyodor of Kiev =

14th-century prince

Fyodor (Lithuanian: Teodoras; fl. 14th century) was the prince of Kiev until 1362. Most likely he was the son of Butvydas, and a younger brother of Gediminas, the grand duke of Lithuania, his pagan name is unknown and he was baptized as Orthodox Fyodor. Only a couple of short notes survive regarding Fyodor's life.

In the early 1320s, Gediminas won the Battle on the Irpen' River against Stanislav of Kiev and captured the city. The Tatars, who also claimed Kiev, retaliated during the years 1324–1325. The Lithuanian Chronicles mention that Gediminas installed his deputy Algimantas, son of Mindaugas from Olshanski family. There were some attempts to claim that Algimantas was Fyodor's pagan name, but they are discharged by evidence that Algimantas was baptized as Mikhail.

In 1331, Vasily Kalika, the newly consecrated archbishop of Novgorod, was traveling from Vladimir-Volynsky to Novgorod. On his way he was stopped by Fyodor, the prince of Kiev, a Tatar tax collector (basqaq), and 50 men. The presence of a Tatar official led historians to believe that while Kiev was ruled by a Lithuanian, it had to pay a tribute to the Golden Horde. Later, a separate Orthodox metropolis of the Grand Duchy of Lithuania was established (Metropolitan Teofilis, who died in 1330) and aid was provided to the Principality of Tver, which was fighting against the Grand Duchy of Moscow. Lithuanians gained full control of Kiev after the victorious Battle of Blue Waters in 1362. According to the Hustyn Chronicle, after the battle, Fyodor was replaced as the prince of Kiev by Vladimir, son of Algirdas.

For a long time scholars assumed that Fyodor was of Rurikid origin (descendant of Oleg I of Chernigov) because of his Christian name. However, in 1916, Russian historian Mikhail Priselkov published a list of property belonging to Theognostus, the metropolitan of Moscow. The list, compiled in 1331, listed two silver cups given to Theognostus by Fyodor, brother of Gediminas. Modern historians agree that Fyodor from the list and Fyodor from Kiev was one and the same person. No other evidence survives regarding Fyodor's family.

== See also ==
- Family of Gediminas
