= Jaunė =

Wife of Gediminas of Lithuania

Jaunė (Belarusian: Еўна, Lithuanian: Jaunė, literally, young woman in Lithuanian; died ca. 1344) was daughter of Prince Ivan of Polatsk and wife of Gediminas, the Grand Duke of Lithuania (1316–1341). She is mentioned in written sources only once – the Bychowiec Chronicle, a late and unreliable source. Therefore, some historians cast a serious doubt on her existence, but modern reference works still widely cite her as the ancestress of the Gediminids dynasty.

== Historicity ==
There are considerable doubts about how many wives Gediminas had. The Bychowiec Chronicle mentions three wives: Vida from Courland, Olga from Smolensk, and Jaunė. Some modern historians suggest that Gediminas had two wives, one from local pagan nobles, and Jaunė, an Orthodox. HIstorian S. C. Rowell claims that Gediminas had only one wife, an unknown pagan duchess. He argues that an important marriage to a Ruthenian or Polish princess like Jaunė would have been noted in contemporary sources.

== Role in politics ==
The Bychowiec Chronicle mentions that after Jaunė's death, brothers Algirdas and Kęstutis became displeased with Jaunutis, whom Gediminas chose as his heir. Soon they deposed Jaunutis. This episode is interpreted that weak Jaunutis was protected by his mother. If such interpretation was accurate, then it would testify the power and influence of queen mother in pagan Lithuania.

== See also ==
- Family of Gediminas – probable family tree of Jaunė
- Gediminids
