= Baltos lankos =

Lithuania-based publishing house specializing in the humanities and literature

Baltos lankos (literally: White Plains originating from a popular folk riddle White Plains, black sheep), founded in 1992, is a Lithuania-based publishing house specializing in the humanities and literature. It is one of Lithuania's best-known publishers, and has printed the works of Tomas Venclova and Jonas Mekas, along with its own periodical. Baltos lankos is responsible for publishing multi volume History of Lithuania.
