= Skalmantas =

Folios 170 and 171 from Zadonshchina. Reproduced from the edition by Jan Frček (1948)

Skalmantas or Skolomend is the name of a possible ancestor of the Gediminid dynasty. In 1975 historian Jerzy Ochmański noted that Zadonshchina, a Russian literary monument written at the end of the 14th century, contains lines in which two sons of Algirdas name their ancestors: "We are two brothers – sons of Algirdas, and grandsons of Gediminas, and great-grandsons of Skalmantas (Skolomend)." This led to the hypothesis that Skalmantas was the long-sought ancestor of the Gediminids and that he and his son Butvydas started the Gediminids dynasty.

According to Synodik of Liubech, a duke Gomantas (who might have been this Skalmantas) had a daughter Helena (probably adult baptismal name, not original Lithuanian) who married the Chernihiv Rurikid princeling Andrew, duke of Kozelsk (died 1339, born perhaps in 1280s), an ancestral uncle of the Oginskis, Puzyna, Gortsakov, Yeletsky, Zvenigorodsky, Bolkhovskoy, Mosalsky and Khotetovsky princely lineages. The property listing of metropolitan Theognostus from mid-14th century reveals that duke Andrew Mstislavich of Kozelsk was married with a lady who was sister (or daughter) of king Gediminas.

== See also ==
- Family of Gediminas
- Gediminid dynasty

== Sources ==
- Baranauskas, Tomas (1996-11-23). "Gedimino kilmė". Voruta (in Lithuanian). 44 (278): 6. Archived from the original on 2007-10-06.
