= Daumantas of Lithuania =

Grand Duke of Lithuania from 1282 to 1285

Daumantas

Grand Duke of Lithuania
- Reign: 1282–1285
- Predecessor: Traidenis
- Successor: Butigeidis
- Died: 1285
- House: Mindaugas

Daumantas or Dovmont (died 1285) was Grand Duke of Lithuania from 1282 to 1285. Daumantas is mentioned in chronicles only once and, in absence of any other evidence, is presumed to be a short-ruled Grand Duke who inherited the title after Traidenis' death in 1281 or 1282. It is assumed that Daumantas was succeeded by Grand Duke Butigeidis. The relationships between Traidenis, Daumantas, and Butegeidis are unknown.

== Biography ==
The period between 1281/1282 (Traidenis' death) and 1289 (rule of Butegeidis) is one of the most poorly documented periods in the history of Lithuania. The only recorded information about the Grand Duke of Lithuania during that time is a short note from 1285. Seven Russian chronicles record the same brief story that in March or August 1285 Lithuanians, led by Grand Duke Daumantas, attacked the domain of Simeon, Bishop of Tver. In particular, the Lithuanians attacked the Oleshnya volost (Russian: волость Олешня) of the Principality of Tver. The location of the Oleshnya volost is unknown, but historians have identified three possibilities – Vladimir Borzakovskiy argued for the village of Aleshevo (Алешево) in Zubtsov uyezd, Vladimir Kuchkin argued for the area between the Sheshma (Шешма) and Vazuza Rivers, local historian Leletsky argued for area around Aleshnya (Алешня) River, tributary of Gzhat River. A day before the feast of the Transfiguration of Jesus (August 6), the Lithuanian army was defeated by united forces of Tver, Moscow, Volokolamsk, Torzhok, Dmitrov, Zubtsov, and Rzhev. Four chronicles mention that Daumantas was taken into captivity, while others say he was killed. That is all the information that is available about Daumantas.

The reason for Daumantas' invasion of Tver is not known. Chronicles also recorded another raid by the Lithuanians to Novgorod Republic in winter 1285, but it is possible that the dates were mixed up and the raid took place before Daumantas' invasion. These two raids into Russian lands indicated a new direction in Lithuanian interests as Traidenis had concentrated on Livonian Order, Black Ruthenia, and Galicia–Volhynia. Historians attempted to place the two raids in the context of sibling rivalry in Novgorod between Dmitry and Andrei, sons of Alexander Nevsky, or succession in Tver by fourteen-year-old Mikhail of Tver, but no definite conclusions can be made due to lack of written sources.

Daumantas of Lithuania Died: 1285?
Royal titles
Preceded by Traidenis	Grand Duke of Lithuania; 1282(?)–1285	Succeeded by Butegeidis
