= Vytenis =

Grand Duke of Lithuania from 1295 to 1316

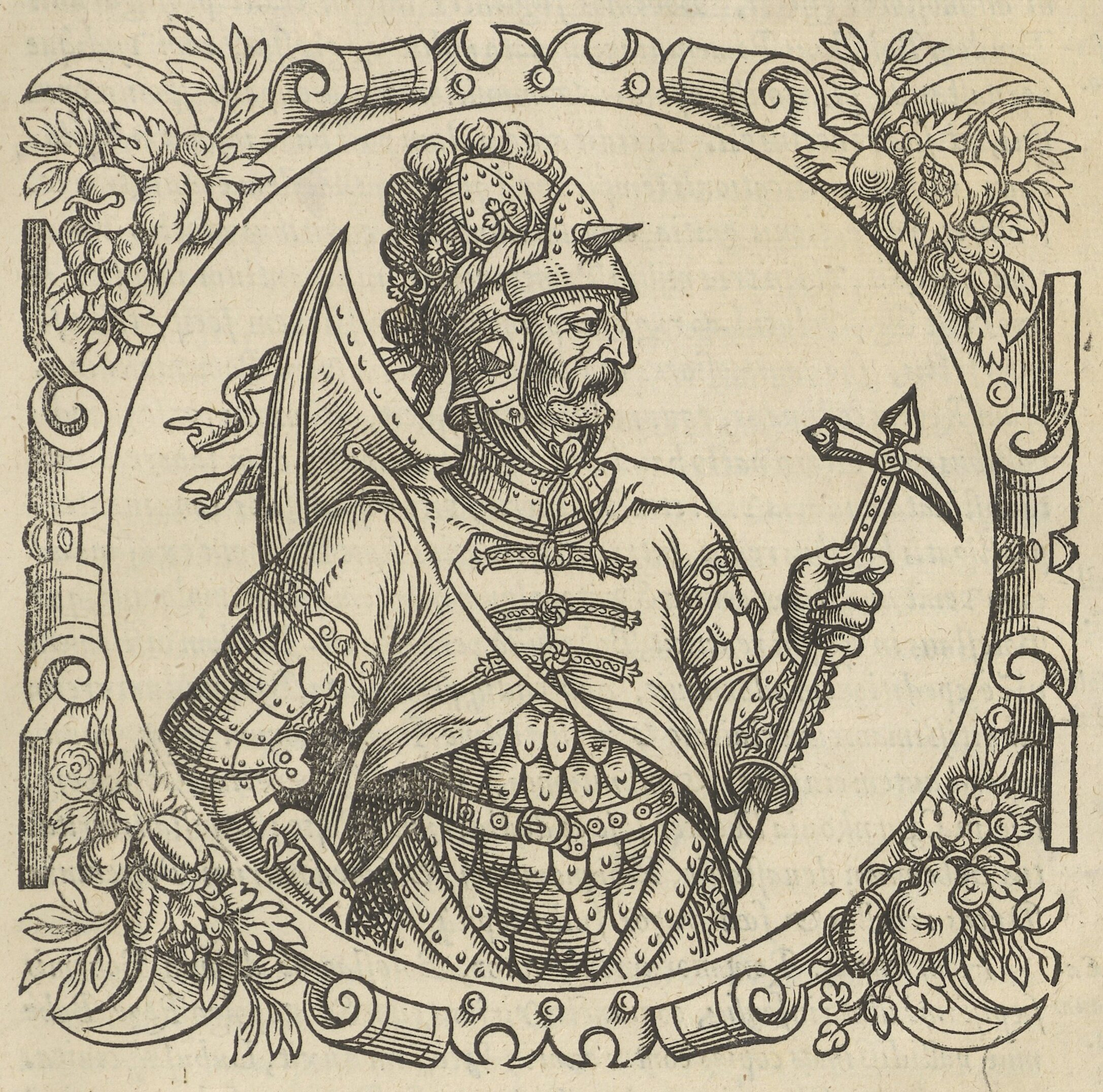
- Engraving from the "Description of Sarmatian Europe" by Alexander Guagnini, 1578.

Grand Duke of Lithuania
- Reign: 1295–1316
- Predecessor: Butvydas
- Successor: Gediminas
- Born: c. 1260
- Died: c. 1316
- Spouse: Vikinda
- Issue: Žvelgutis
- House: House of Gediminas
- Father: Butvydas

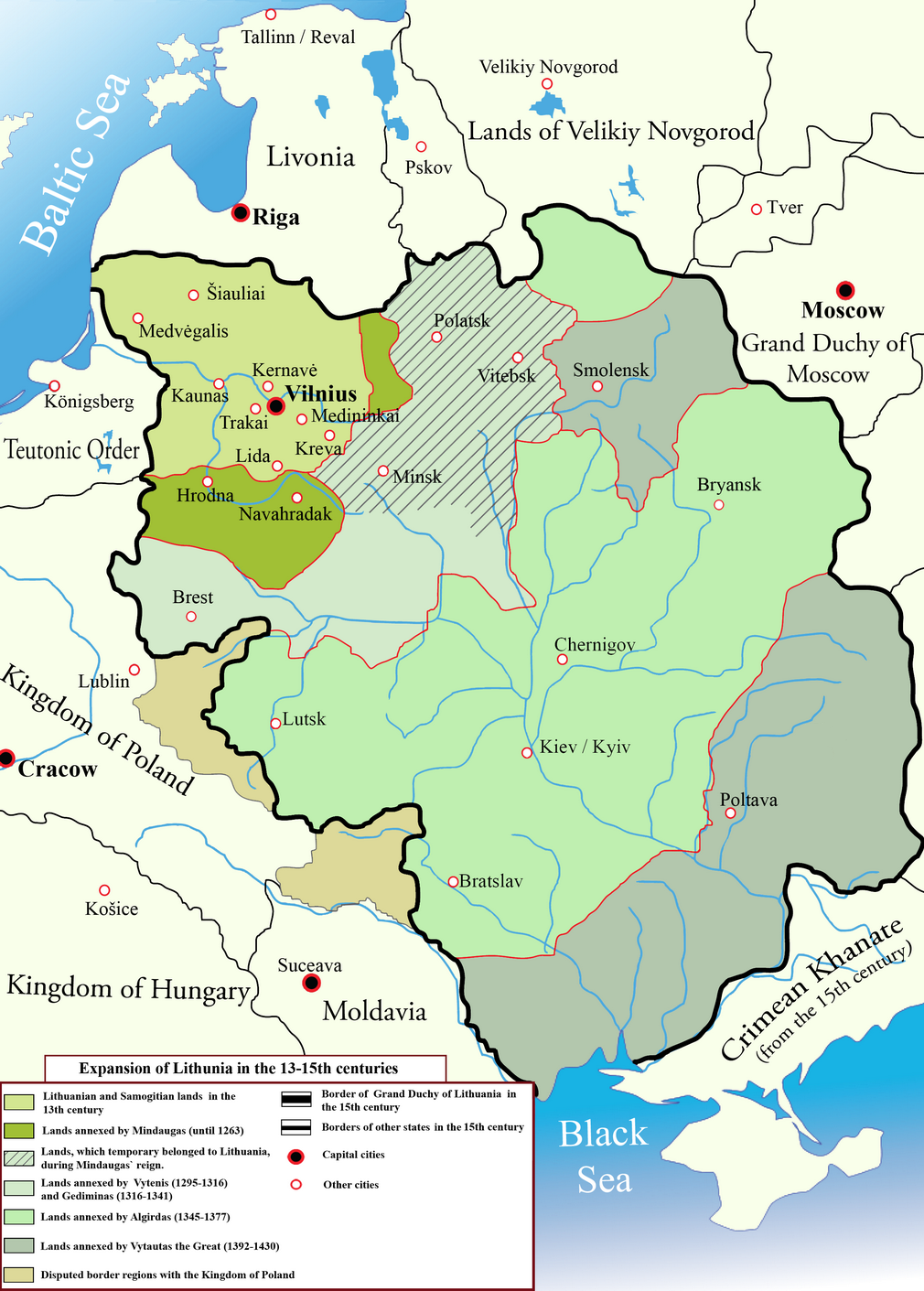
Expansion of the Grand Duchy of Lithuania, 13th–15th centuries

Vytenis (Note: Belarusian: Віцень, romanized: Vicień; Polish: Witenes) was Grand Duke of Lithuania from c. 1295 to c. 1316. He became the first monarch of the Gediminid dynasty to sustain a long-lasting reign, establishing the dynasty’s continuity and long-term governance of Lithuania. In the early 14th century, his reputation outshone that of Gediminas, who is regarded by modern historians as one of the greatest Lithuanian rulers. The rule of Vytenis was marked by constant warfare in an effort to consolidate the Grand Duchy of Lithuania with the Ruthenians, Masovians, and the Teutonic Order.

== Warfare ==
Vytenis is mentioned for the first time in 1292 during his father's invasion of Masovia: an army of 800 men reached as far as Łęczyca. During this raid he fought one of the most victorious battles (Battle of Trojanów). After his father's death, c. 1295, he became Grand Duke. Vytenis was soon involved in succession disputes in Poland, supporting Boleslaus II of Masovia, who was married to a Lithuanian duchess Gaudemunda, and opposing Władysław I of Poland. In Ruthenia, Vytenis managed to recapture lands lost after the assassination of Mindaugas and capture the principalities of Pinsk and Turov.

The crusade against pagan Lithuania and Samogitia intensified and reached a new level in the 1290s as Prussians and other Baltic tribes were conquered by the Teutonic Knights and Livonian Order. During Vytenis's reign a network of defensive castles was established and strengthened along the banks of the Neman and Jūra rivers; the Knights matched this with their own castles on the opposite bank. During this time, the Teutonic Order was attempting to establish a corridor along the Baltic Sea, in Samogitia, to link up with the Livonian Order to the north. During the reign of Vytenis, the Teutonic Knights organized some 20 raids into Samogitia. Vytenis took measures to undermine influence of local Samogitian nobles, as evidenced by an increasing numbers of traitors and refugees. It seems that Gediminas was helping Vytenis to control the nobles, who seriously considered resettling in Prussia as vassals of the Teutonic Knights. The Order also consolidated its control over Semigalia, where Lithuanians had their garrisons since the Battle of Aizkraukle. The Order captured Dynaburg Castle, controlled by Lithuanians since 1281, in 1313.

== Alliance with Riga ==
One of the most celebrated achievements of Vytenis was an alliance with Riga. In 1297 disagreements between the Archbishop of Riga, burghers of Riga, and the Livonian Order grew into an internal war. Vytenis offered help to the citizens of Riga and even made some vague promises to convert to Christianity, to ease religious tensions between the pagan soldiers and Christian residents. Vytenis successfully invaded Livonia, destroyed Karkus castle north of Riga, and defeated the order in the Battle of Turaida, killing Livonian Land Master Bruno and 22 knights. When Livonia was secured, Vytenis organized eleven campaigns into territories of the Teutonic Knights in Prussia in 1298–1313, including one to Brodnica, where the entire population was massacred. His cause was helped by the fact that in 1308 the Teutonic Knights conquered Pomerania and started its quarrels with Poland.

A Lithuanian garrison, situated in a "Lithuanian castle" outside the city, guarded Riga until 1313 when the city residents gave it to the Order and sent the pagans away. Friendship with Riga fostered trade and commerce, and helped to consolidate Lithuanian influence in the Daugava basin, where c. 1307 Polatsk, a major trade post, was annexed by Lithuania. Due to close contacts with Riga Vytenis invited Franciscan friars to maintain a Catholic church in Navahrudak for German merchants in 1312. In the field of religion, it seems that Vytenis laid the groundwork for the creation of the Metropolitanate of Lithuania c. 1316. The metropolitanate was a tool in the competition between Vilnius and Moscow for the religious leadership in Ruthenia.

== Death and succession ==
Vytenis died ca. 1315 without an heir. The circumstances surrounding his death are not known. For a long time Russian historians claimed that he was struck by lightning. However, that was a mistake of a Russian scribe: it was an inadequate translation of Teutonic propaganda that Gediminas killed his master Vytenis and usurped his throne. Vytenis is mentioned for the last time in September 1315 during the unsuccessful siege of Christmemel, the first castle built by the Teutonic Knights on the right bank of the Neman River. Historians know of only one son of Vytenis, Žvelgutis (Swalegote), who possibly died before his father. Such a situation allowed Gediminas, brother of Vytenis, to become the Grand Duke of Lithuania. During his reign the Grand Duchy became a major military and political power in the Eastern Europe.

== See also ==
- family of Gediminas – family tree of Vytenis
- Gediminids

== Notes ==
Vytenis House of Gediminas Born: 1260 Died: 1316
Royal titles
Preceded by Butvydas	Grand Duke of Lithuania; 1294/1295–1316	Succeeded by Gediminas
