= Battle of Strėva =

1348 battle

- Part of the Lithuanian Crusade
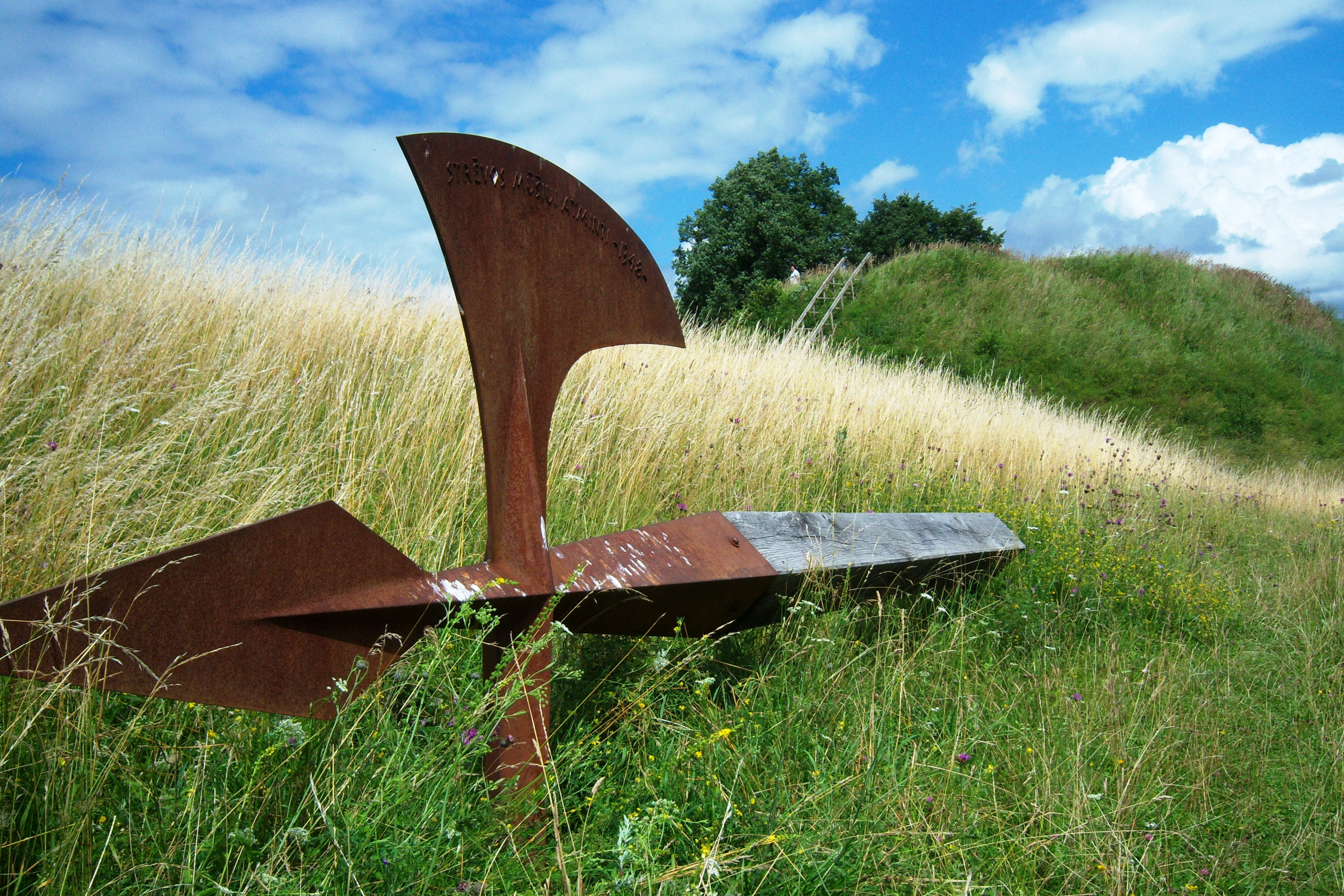
- Monument located at the site of the battle.
Date	2 February 1348
Location	Strėva River near Žiežmariai 54°48′N 24°25′E
Result	Teutonic Order Victory

Belligerents
Teutonic Order	Grand Duchy of Lithuania

Commanders and leaders
Grand Commander Winrich von Kniprode	Kęstutis or Narimantas

The Battle of Strėva, Strebe, or Strawe was fought on 2 February 1348 between the Teutonic Order and the pagan Grand Duchy of Lithuania on the banks of the Strėva River, a right tributary of the Neman River, near present-day Žiežmariai. Chronicler Wigand of Marburg publicized this battle as a great victory for the Knights: he claims that some 18,000 Lithuanians were killed or drowned while only 8 knights and 60 other soldiers died on the Order's side. Narimantas and Manvydas, two sons of Gediminas, Grand Duke of Lithuania, are thought to have been killed in the battle.

== Campaign and battle ==
In 1347, the Teutonic Knights saw an influx of crusaders from France and England, where a truce was made during the Hundred Years' War. Their expedition started in late January 1348, but due to bad weather, the bulk of the forces did not proceed further than Insterburg. A small army led by Grand Commander and future Grand Master Winrich von Kniprode invaded and pillaged central Lithuania (probably areas around Semeliškės, Aukštadvaris, Trakai) for a week before being confronted by Lithuanian troops. The Lithuanian army included contingents from its eastern territories (Volodymyr-Volynskyi, Vitebsk, Polotsk, Smolensk) which shows that the army was assembled beforehand, probably for a campaign into the Teutonic territory.

The Knights were in a difficult position: they could cross the frozen Strėva River only a few men at a time and once most of their forces had crossed, the remaining soldiers would be annihilated. The knights had limited supplies and could not wait. The Lithuanians, led by Kęstutis or Narimantas, also had short supplies and decided to attack by hurling arrows and spears injuring a great number. However, at the critical moment the crusaders counter-attacked with their heavy cavalry and the Lithuanians lost their formation. So many of them drowned in the river that Knights could cross it with "dry feet." This episode caused much criticism of the source: the Strėva River is shallow, especially during winter, and could not have caused such a massive drowning.

== Aftermath ==
As a result of the defeat Lithuanians were weakened: the same year the Knights attacked and pillaged Šiauliai area without much of opposition and destroyed a castle in Veliuona. In the east, Lithuania lost influence in Pskov and Novgorod in 1348 and in Smolensk the following year. The Knights attributed the victory to the Virgin Mary and in her honor Grand Master Winrich von Kniprode established a Cistercian nunnery in Königsberg and a Franciscan monastery in Wehlau. However, due to the change in leadership (the Grand Master Heinrich Dusemer was troubled by poor health and died in 1353) and spreading Black Death, the Knights did not take full advantage of one of the biggest defeats of the Grand Duchy.
