= Oginskis =

Oginskis may have the following meanings:

- The plural form of the Polish surname Oginski, e.g., in the meaning Ogiński family.
- A Lithuanian form of the surname "Oginski"
- A Latvian surname:
  - Aleksejs Kuplovs-Oginskis, Latvian football midfielder
  - Viktors Oginskis, Latvian rock musician
