= Narimantas =

Prince of Polotsk and Pinsk

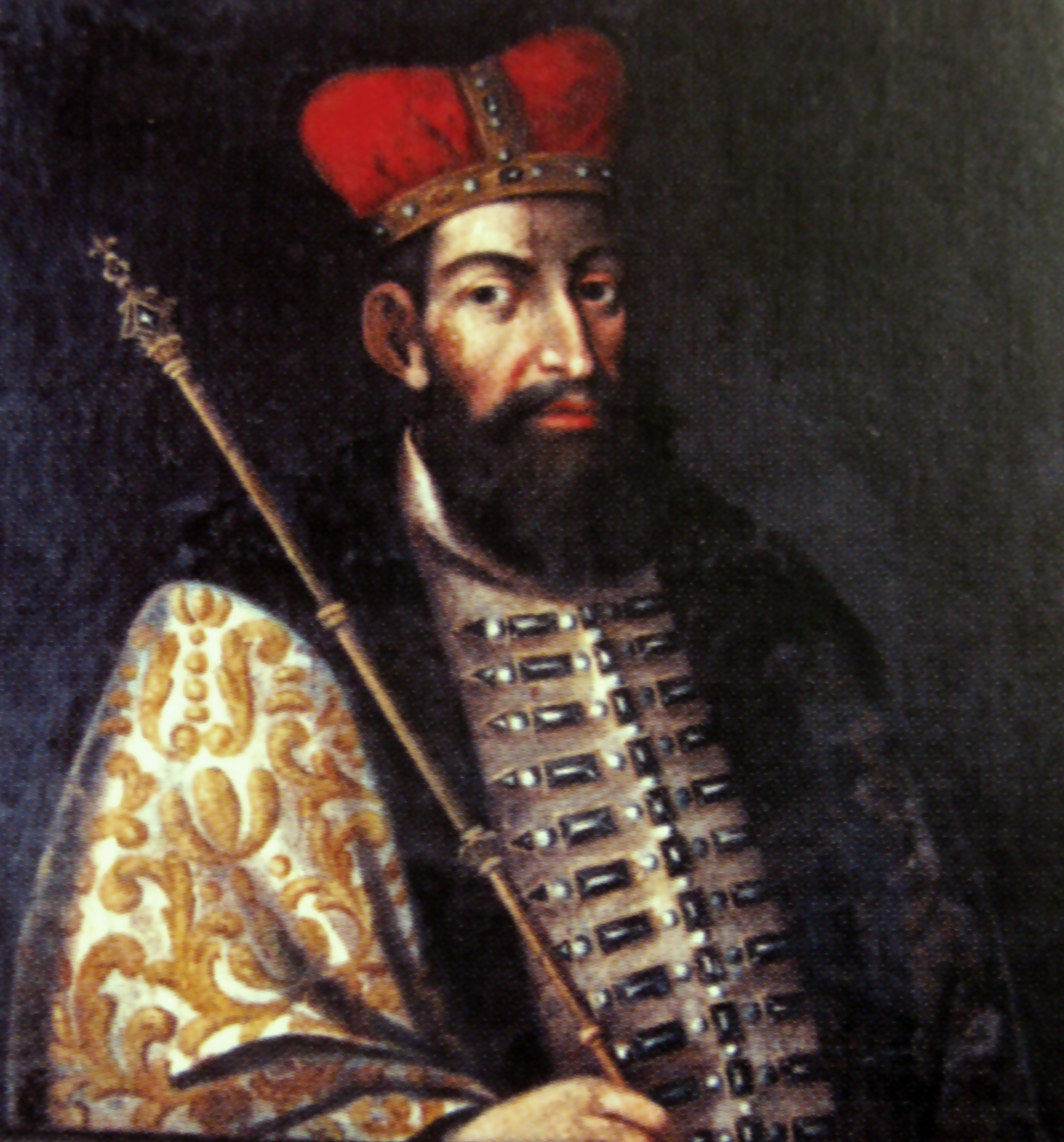
A fantasy portrait from the 18th century

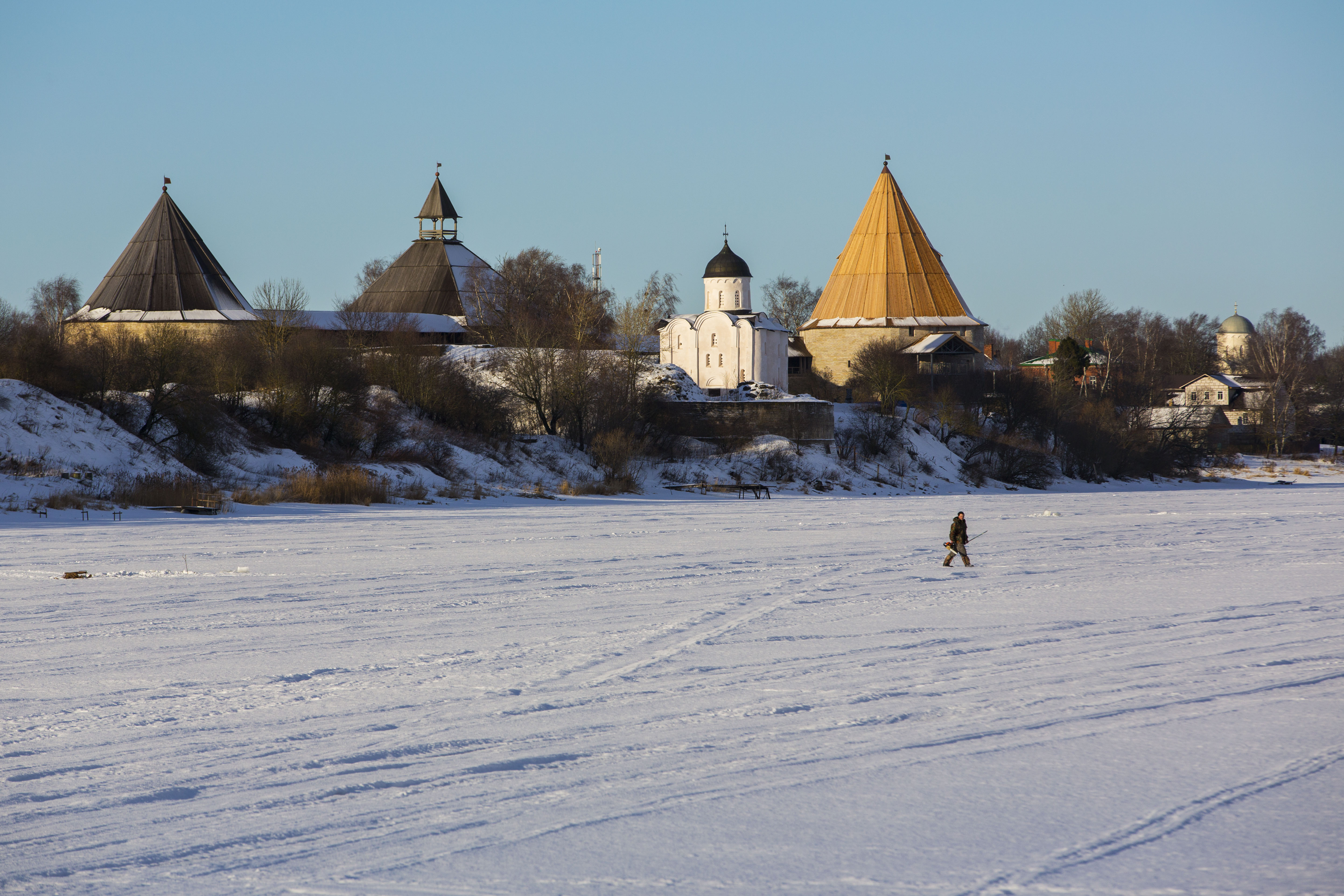
The fortress of Ladoga

Narimantas, also known as Narymunt or Narimunt (Russian: Наримунт; (Note: Alternatively spelled as Narimont; Russian: Наримонт.) baptized Gleb; died 2 February 1348), was a Lithuanian duke and the second eldest son of Gediminas, the grand duke of Lithuania.

During various periods of his life, he ruled Pinsk and Polotsk. In 1333, he was accepted by Novgorod's nobles to rule and protect territories in the north, including Ladoga, Oreshek and Korela. He was the first of several Lithuanian service princes in Novgorod.

== Life ==
He was baptized in 1333 in or before reaching Novgorod. This made him ineligible to succeed his father as ruler of Lithuanians, despite his primogeniture right. Before this, Gediminas had "peacefully" seized Novgorod's boyars when they were making their way to Metropolitan Theognostus in Volhynia with their candidate Vasily for the episcopal see of Novgorod. They were released after guaranteeing that the dependent towns of Ladoga, Oreshek and Korela, as well as half of Koporye, would be given to Narimantas "as his votchina and a patrimony for his sons." The chronicle account of the treaty says that the boyars agreed to this only because they found themselves "in such distress."

The city accepted him as prince of those dependent towns. However, Narimantas did not offer military assistance and the Novgorodians later sought reconciliation with Grand Prince Ivan I of Moscow, who arrived in Novgorod in 1335. According to the historian John L. I. Fennell, "we can only assume that... Narimunt had been helping his uncle Voin to defend Lithuania's easternmost dependent principality, Polotsk. As well as conducting a war with the Germans, the Lithuanians were also obliged to defend themselves against the Tatars in 1338."

Narimantas supported his brother Jaunutis when he was deposed by Algirdas and Kęstutis in 1345. In order to avoid getting killed by his younger brothers, he escaped Vilnius in the autumn of 1344. Narimantas travelled to Jani Beg, the khan of the Golden Horde, asking for support against Algirdas. Though he failed to solicit support, he is rumoured to have married a Tatar princess, possibly as a second wife. After returning, Narimantas reconciled with Algirdas but was killed leading the Battle of Strėva against the Teutonic Knights on 2 February 1348. His descendants include Princes Kurakin, Galitzine, Khovansky, and Korecki.

== Issue ==
It is believed that Narimantas had five sons:

- Aleksander (died after 1386), prince of Podolia
- Yury (died in 1392), prince of Belz
- Nikolai, prince of Pinsk
- Patrikas (died c. 1387), prince of Starodub-Seversk
- Simeon (died after 1386)

The Polish genealogist and historian Józef Puzyna strongly refutes the claim that Narimantas' progeny would have been born of a Tatar wife. He advances a hypothesis that the names of Narimantas' sons indicate that their mother was an Orthodox Ruthenian woman.

Other genealogists give as his wife Marija, daughter of Toqta (died c. 1312), the khan of the Golden Horde, and his wife Maria Palaiologina (born 1297), bastard daughter of Andronikos II Palaiologos, the emperor of Byzantium.

== See also ==
- Family of Gediminas – family tree of Narimantas
- Gediminids

== Sources ==
- Fennell, John (2023). The Emergence of Moscow, 1304–1359. University of California Press. ISBN 978-0-520-34759-5.
- Presnyakov, Aleksandr E. (1970). Rieber, Alfred J. (ed.). The Formation of the Great Russian State: A Study of Russian History in the Thirteenth to Fifteenth Centuries. Translated by Moorhouse, A.E. Quadrangle Books. ISBN 9781131812656.
- Sjöström (2011), Liettuan gediminidien suomensukuiset geneettiset juuret. ISSN 1239-3487, Donelaitis - Donelaitis-seuran - Liettuan Ystävät ryn lehti 1/2011, ss 16..18
