= Stephen Christopher Rowell =

English historian (born 1964)

- Born: Stephen Christopher Rowell; 9 May 1964 (age 62); Leicester, England

Academic background
- Education: Magdalene College, Cambridge (BA); University of Cambridge (PhD)
- Thesis: The role of Christianity in the last pagan state in Europe: Lithuania, 1315-1342 (1990)

Academic work
- Discipline: History
- School or tradition: Cambridge School
- Institutions: Magdalene College; Clare College; University of Cambridge; Vilnius University; Vytautas Magnus University; Klaipėda University
- Notable works: Lithuania Ascending: A Pagan Empire within East-Central Europe, 1295–1345 (1994), Chartularium Lithuaniae res gestas magni ducis Gedeminne illustrans (2003)

Stephen Christopher Rowell (born 9 May 1964 in Leicester) is a British historian, translator and author of many publications and books about the Grand Duchy of Lithuania. His book Lithuania Ascending: A Pagan Empire within East-Central Europe, 1295–1345 was published by Cambridge University Press in 1994.

== Biography ==
Stephen Rowell studied history, Latin, French, and Russian languages at Magdalene College, Cambridge, graduating in 1985, before working at the college as a researcher in 1988–89. From 1990 to 1993, Rowell lectured at Clare College, Cambridge about the History of Europe and Ruthenia in the Middle Ages.

Rowell visited Lithuania for the first time in 1985. He subsequently wrote a dissertation on The Role of Christianity in the Last Pagan State in Europe: Lithuania, 1315-1342, for which he obtained the degree of Doctor of Philosophy from the University of Cambridge in 1990.

In 1992–94, Rowell lectured in history at Vilnius University, Vytautas Magnus University, and Klaipėda University. From 1993 to 1999, he was a professor at the Klaipėda University. Since 2001, he has been the editor-in-chief of the periodical Lithuanian Historical Studies.

== Publications ==
Rowell has published more than 50 articles on medieval Europe and the early history of the Grand Duchy of Lithuania, in both Lithuanian and foreign publications.
