= Family of Kęstutis =

Lithuanian noble family

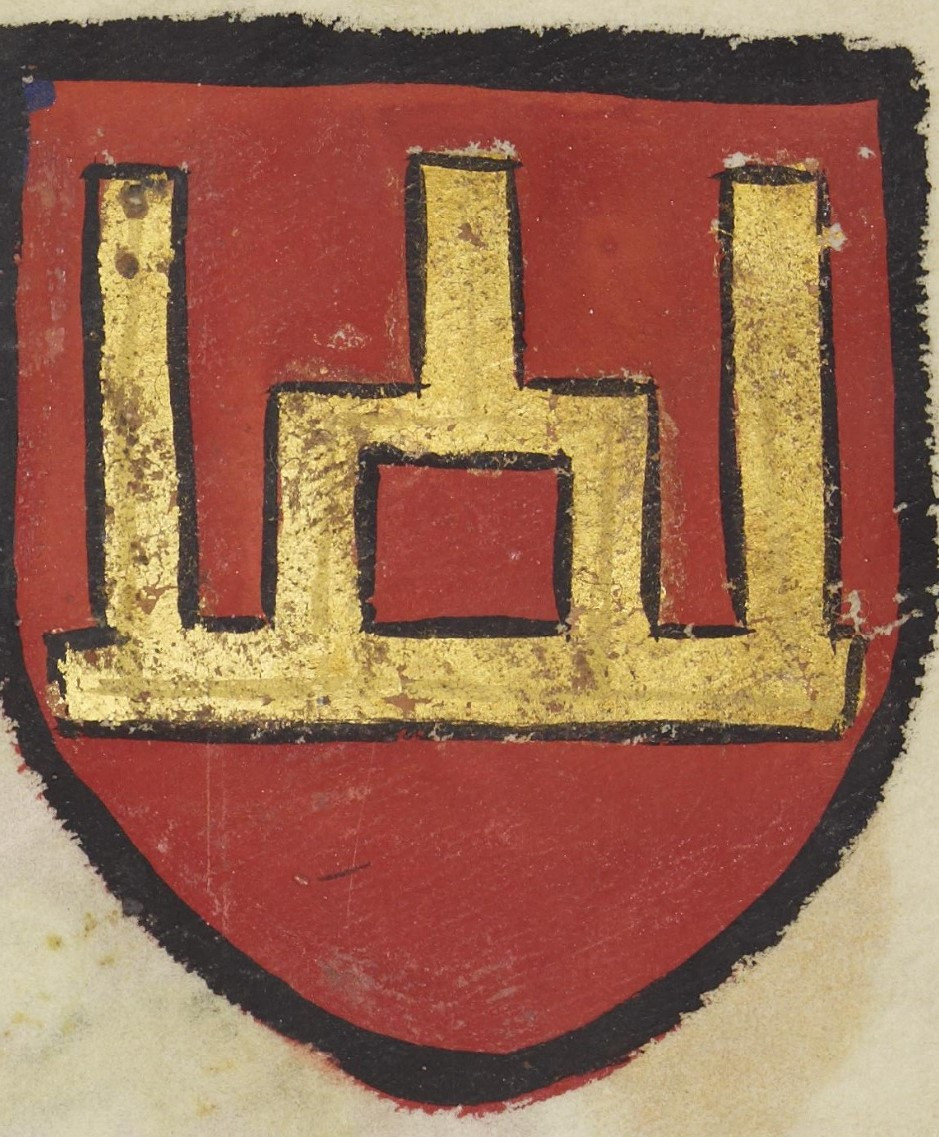
Columns of Gediminids, an emblem of Kęstutis' ancestors, 1416

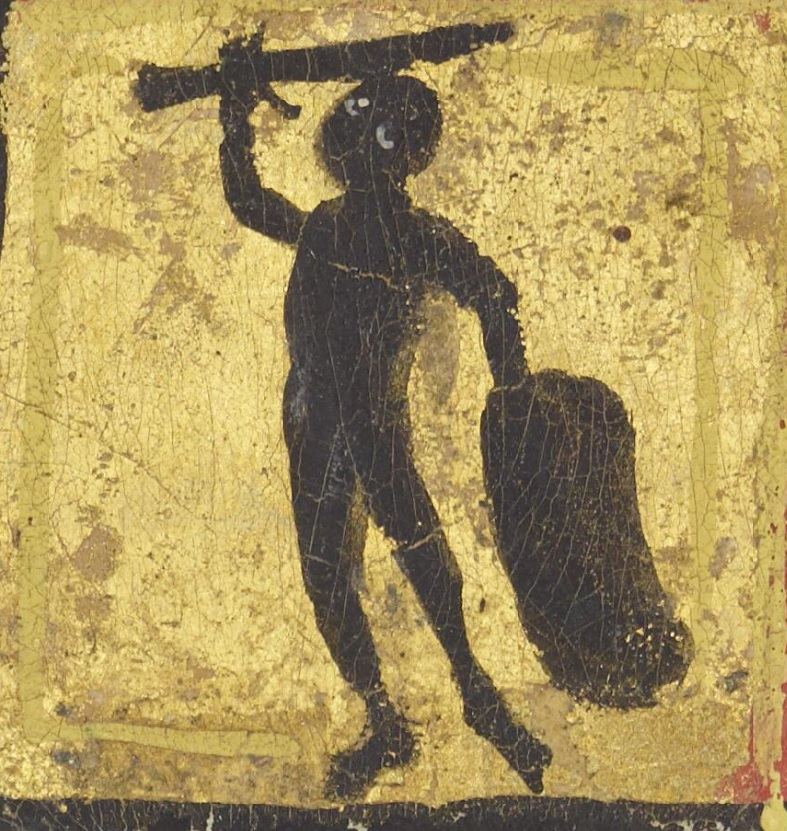
Coat of arms of Kęstutaičiai, used by Grand Duke Vytautas the Great during the Council of Constance in 1416

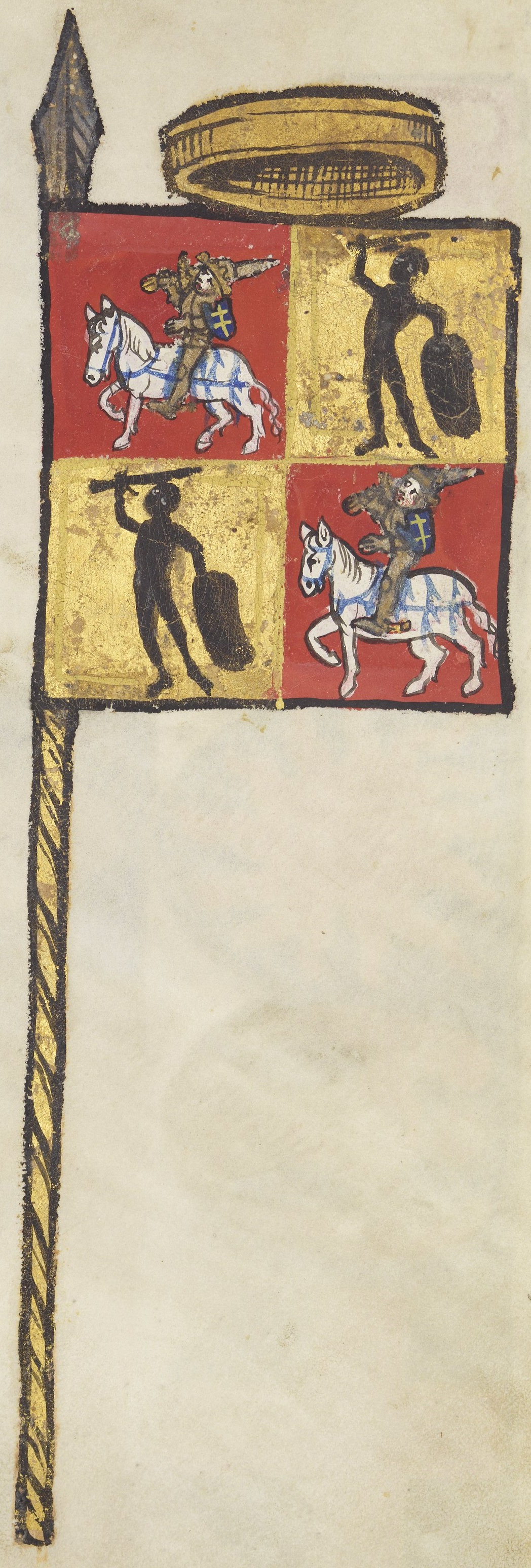
Flag of Vytautas the Great with a standing knight of Kęstutaičiai and Lithuanian Vytis (Waikymas), used during the Council of Constance in the early 15th century

The family of Kęstutis (Lithuanian: Kęstutaičiai), Grand Duke of Lithuania is listed here. He might have co-ruled with his brother Algirdas from 1345 to 1377 and became anti-ruler to his nephew Jogaila in years 1381-1382.

== Parents ==
- Gediminas (c. 1275 – winter 1341), Grand Duke of Lithuania (1316–1341)
- Jaunė (died in 1344), daughter of Prince Ivan of Polotsk

== Wives ==
- Name not known, (died c. 1351)
- Birutė (died probably in 1382)

== Brothers ==
- Algirdas (c. 1300 – end of May 1377), Grand Duke of Lithuania (1345–1377)
- Manvydas (c. 1300–1348), Duke of Kernavė and Slonim (1341–1348)
- Narimantas (baptized Gleb; c. 1300–1348), Duke of Pinsk, Polock and Novgorod
- Jaunutis (baptized Iwan; c. 1300 – after 1366), Grand Duke of Lithuania (1341–1345), Duke of Izjaslawl (1346–1366)
- Karijotas (baptized Michal; c. 1300 – c. 1362), Prince of Navahradak (1341–1362)
- Liubartas (baptized Dymitr; c. 1300–1384), Volodymyr and Luck (1340–1384)

== Sisters ==
- Maria (c. 1300–1349), Princess of Lithuania
- Aldona of Lithuania (Anna; after 1309 – 26 May 1339), Princess of Lithuania, Queen of Poland (1333–1339)
- Damilla (baptized Elzbieta; died in 1364), Princess of Płock
- Eufemija (died on 5 February 1342), Princess of Halicz and Volodymyr-Halicz
- Aigustė (Anastazja; died on 11 March 1345), Grand Princess of Vladimir-Moscow

== Sons ==
- Vaidotas (fl. 1362), Duke of Navahrudak
- Vaišvilas (died c. 1387)
- Butautas (Henryk; died after 1381)
- Vytautas the Great (c. 1350 – 27 October 1430 in Lutsk), Grand Duke of Lithuania (1401–1430)
- Tautvilas Kęstutaitis (Conrad; died in September 1390), Prince of Black Ruthenia (1386–1390)
- Žygimantas Kęstutaitis (after 1350 – murdered on 20 March 1440), Duke of Trakai, Grand Duke of Lithuania (1432–1440)

== Daughters ==
- Mikova (Maria; died in 1404), Grand Princess of Tver (1375–1404?)
- Danutė of Lithuania (Anna; 1362 – 25 May 1448), Princess of Warsaw (1376–1429)
- Rimgailė (Anna; died in 1433), Princess of Masovia (4 February – 30 June 1392), Voivodess of Moldavia (1419–1421)
- A daughter (name unknown) (c. 1347 – ?)
