= Aigusta Anastasia of Lithuania =

Princess of Moscow from 1341 to 1345

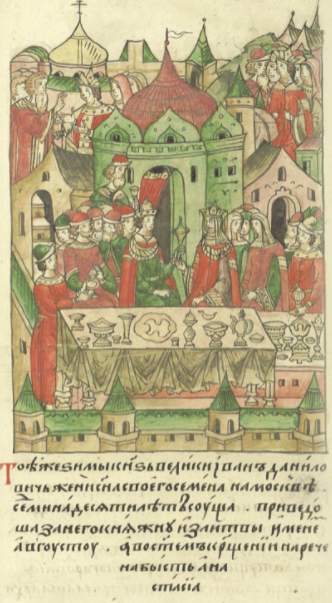
- The wedding of Aigusta and Simeon, miniature from the Illustrated Chronicle of Ivan the Terrible (16th century)

Princess consort of Moscow
- Tenure: 31 March 1340 – 11 March 1345

Grand Princess consort of Vladimir
- Tenure: 31 March 1340 – 11 March 1345
- Born: c. 1320
- Died: 11 March 1345; Moscow
- Burial: Moscow Kremlin
- Spouse: Simeon of Moscow
- Issue: Vasily; Konstantin; Vasilisa
Names
- Anastasia Gediminovna; Russian: Анастасия Гедиминовна
- House: Gediminids
- Father: Gediminas of Lithuania

Aigusta Anastasia of Lithuania (Lithuanian: Aigustė Gediminaitė; Russian: Анастасия Гедиминовна, romanized: Anastasiya Gediminovna; c. 1320 – 11 March 1345) was the princess of Moscow and grand princess of Vladimir from 1340 until her death in 1345 as the wife of Simeon of Moscow. She was most likely the daughter of Gediminas, the grand duke of Lithuania.

== Life ==
There is no direct evidence that Aigusta was a daughter of Gediminas, but because of her high-profile marriage, most historians have concluded that she was a member of Gediminas' family. Alternatively, she may have been a granddaughter of Gediminas. She was born probably between 1316 and 1321.

Aigusta was baptized as Anastasia in order to marry Simeon of Moscow in November or December 1333. She was brought to Moscow and converted to the Eastern Orthodox faith. Simeon, who was 17 years old and the eldest son of Ivan I, may have married a Lithuanian princess because his father was unwilling to completely sever relations with Lithuania. The same year also marked the peak of Lithuanian eastward expansion during Ivan's reign. The marriage led to a truce between Lithuania and Moscow, and although conflict broke out again in 1335, Aigusta may have helped extend Lithuanian influence among Gediminas' strongest rivals.

According to Russian chronicles, in 1345 she gave financial support to a group of icon painters led by Goytan, who was commissioned to paint the Cathedral of the Savior on the Bor. The painters were known to be "master elders and leaders, Russian by birth, but Greek disciples: Goytan, Semyon, and Ivan, and their other pupils and companions".

Her two sons Vasily and Konstantin did not survive infancy; her daughter Vasilisa in 1350 married Mikhail Vasilyevich of Kashin, a son of Vasily of Tver whose family were opposed to Lithuania. Her brother, Jaunutis, sought her help when he was deposed by Algirdas in 1345. Immediately before her death on 11 March 1345, Augusta became a nun. She was buried within the Moscow Kremlin at the Cathedral of the Savior on the Bor, whose construction she had sponsored.

== Sources ==
- Boguslavsky, Vladimir V.; Kuksina, Elena I. (2001). "Анастасия Гедиминовна". Славянская энциклопедия. Киевская Русь — Московия. Т. 1: А–М (in Russian). Vol. 1. Moskva: ОЛМА Медиа Групп. p. 25. ISBN 9785224022502.
- Fennell, John L. I. (15 November 2023) [1968]. The Emergence of Moscow, 1304–1359. University of California Press. ISBN 978-0-520-34759-5.

Russian royalty
Vacant Title last held by Alexandra	Princess consort of Moscow; 1340–1345	Vacant Title next held by Eupraxia of Smolensk
