= Jonas Vaidutis =

Duke of Drohiczyn
- Reign: ?–1402
- Born: 1365; Drohiczyn, Grand Duchy of Lithuania
- Died: Spring 1402 (aged 36–37); Kraków, Kingdom of Poland
- Burial: Wawel Cathedral (presumably)
- House: Gediminids
- Father: Butautas
- Mother: Unknown
- Religion: Lithuanian paganism, later Catholic

Jonas Vaidutis (Latin: Waydutte; Polish: Jan Wajduta Butawtowicz; 1365 – spring 1402) was a Lithuanian duke, priest, and academic rector from the Gediminid dynasty. Vaidutis was a son of duke Butautas and a grandson of the former Lithuanian monarch Kęstutis. He titled himself as the Duke of Drohiczyn.

He held the positions of the Custos of the Franciscans of Kraków and the Canon of Kraków and Sandomierz. From 1401 to 1402, the year of his death, he was the Rector of the Jagiellonian University in Kraków.

According to Czech philologist Tomáš Hoskovec, Vaidutis was the first ethnic Lithuanian to be a European intellectual. Lithuanian-American historian Vanda Sruogienė deemed him the earliest known Lithuanian to graduate from a university. His pre-Christian Lithuanian name Vaidutis is sometimes confused with that of his uncle Vaidotas.

== Biography ==
Vaidutis was born in 1365 in Drohiczyn, Grand Duchy of Lithuania. His father was Lithuanian duke Butautas, a son of the monarch Kęstutis. Butautas unsuccessfully attempted a coup d'état in the Grand Duchy of Lithuania, failing to capture the capital city Vilnius while the monarchs Kęstutis and Algirdas were away in Volhynia assisting their brother Liubartas, the Grand Prince of Volhynia. Therefore, in 1365, Butautas retreated first to the Prussia region controlled by the State of the Teutonic Order and then to the royal manor of Charles IV, Holy Roman Emperor in Prague, the capital city of the Kingdom of Bohemia. By departing abroad Butautas left his recently born son Vaidutis in the Grand Duchy of Lithuania. It is thought that Vaidutis entered into the custody of his grandfather Kęstutis or possibly his uncle Vaidotas.

In 1381, around the outbreak of the first Lithuanian civil war, sixteen-year-old Vaidutis followed in his father's footsteps by departing to Prussia. The Toruń chronicle attests that Vaidutis arrived in Riesenburg in early February, with Kęstutis supposedly being unaware of his departure. He subsequently traveled to the imperial court in Prague, arriving after his father Butautas had died there, possibly of a plague outbreak in the city. Vaidutis may have decided to remain abroad because Kęstutis had been killed in 1382 after being imprisoned in Kreva Castle by Jogaila.

It is believed that Vaidutis was baptized in Prague as Jonas (Czech: Jan). While in Bohemia, Vaidutis studied at the University of Prague (possibly in the Faculty of Theology) and was ordained as a priest. According to some accounts, Vaidutis went on to Paris, where he graduated from a university in 1387. Despite being abroad, Vaidutis retained personal connections with the Lithuanian nobles as he swore an oath to the Lithuanian duke Žadvydas, who conflicted with the Lithuanian monarch Skirgaila.

Later on, Jonas Vaidutis moved to the Kingdom of Poland, which was ruled by his Gediminid relative, King Władysław II Jagiełło (Lithuanian: Jogaila). Since at least 1389, Jonas Vaidutis was appointed as the custos of the Franciscans of Kraków and as the canon of the Kraków Cathedral and Sandomierz Collegiate Church. In 1401, he was elected as the second rector of the Jagiellonian University in Kraków after it was reformed in 1400 by Władysław II Jagiełło. Jonas Vaidutis' career developed with the patronage of Władysław II Jagiełło. The election took place on St. Gall's Day, 16 October 1401. His candidacy was supported by the outgoing rector, Stanisław of Skarbimierz, who delivered a laudation in favor of the prince, emphasizing his theological education, noble birth, and virtuous conduct. He also mentioned that the prince had been a benefactor of the university.

Vaidutis did not hold the position of rector for long; by May of the following year, he was already deceased. During his tenure, the university admitted only 43 students. He was presumably buried in the Kraków Cathedral. His successor was Mikołaj of Gorzków, a canon of the Kraków Cathedral and later the bishop of Vilnius.

== Bibliography ==
- Pechta, Agnieszka (2003). "Jan Wajduta Butawtowicz - zapomniany książę litewski w oświetleniu historiografii polskiej" (PDF). Piotrkowskie Zeszyty Historyczne. 5.
