= Jaunutis =

Grand Duke of Lithuania from 1341 to 1345

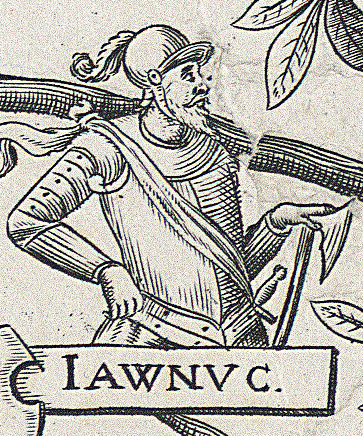
- Depiction of Jaunutis by Alaksandar Tarasievič (1675)

Grand Duke of Lithuania
- Reign: 1341–1345
- Predecessor: Gediminas
- Successor: Algirdas

Prince of Izyaslavl
- Reign: 1350–1366
- Predecessor: Algirdas
- Successor: Michael of Izyaslavl
- Born: c. 1300
- Died: after 1366
- House: Gediminid

Jaunutis (Polish: Jawnuta; Belarusian: Яўнут; lit. 'young man'; Christian name: Ioann; also John or Ivan; c. 1300 – after 1366) was Grand Duke of Lithuania from 1341 to 1345, when he was deposed by his elder brothers, Algirdas and Kęstutis. He was the son of Gediminas.

== Succession ==
According to Polish historian Jan Tęgowski, he was probably born between 1306 and 1309.

Jaunutis was not mentioned in any written sources prior to Gediminas' death. Before Gediminas' death, all his sons had been granted a domain of Lithuania. Only the second-youngest son, Jaunutis, had not received any domains but lived with his parents in Vilnius. When his father died, he automatically became the ruler of Vilnius and the nearby lands. In Gediminas' time, it was already customary to regard the Duke of Vilnius as the ruler of the whole Grand Duchy of Lithuania. There are many theories why Gediminas chose Jaunutis, a middle son, as his successor. Some suggested that he was an acceptable compromise between pagan (Algirdas and Kęstutis) and Orthodox (Narimantas, Karijotas, Liubartas) sons of Gediminas. Others claimed that Jaunutis was the eldest son of Gediminas' second wife; thus the tradition that Gediminas was married twice: to a pagan and to an Orthodox duchess.

== Rule ==
Very little is known about the years when Jaunutis ruled. Those were quite peaceful years, as the Teutonic Knights were led by the ineffective Ludolf König. His brothers were much more active: Algirdas attacked Mozhaysk, Livonian Order, defended Pskov, Kęstutis was helping Liubartas in succession disputes in Galicia–Volhynia.

Seeing that Jaunutis hesitates to provide help with their military campaigns, his two elder brothers, Algirdas and Kęstutis, agreed to remove Jaunutis and take power into their own hands. Kęstutis, who ruled the nearby Duchy of Trakai, unexpectedly captured Vilnius, he summoned Algirdas and let him rule the whole Duchy of Vilnius. As compensation, the brothers gave Jaunutis the Principality of Izyaslavl, but Jaunutis did not want to yield and refused the duchy.

The Bychowiec Chronicle mentions that Jaunutis was supported by Jaunė, the presumed wife of Gediminas and mother of his children. She died c. 1344 soon after Jaunutis lost his throne. If he was indeed protected by his mother, then it would be an interesting example of influence held by queen mother in pagan Lithuania. However, a concrete stimulus might have been a major reise planned by the Teutonic Knights in 1345.

== Later life ==
Jaunutis was supported by his brother Narimantas, who traveled to Jani Beg, Khan of the Golden Horde, to form an alliance against Algirdas and Kęstutis. Jaunutis was imprisoned in Vilnius, but managed to escape and went to his Russian brother-in-law Simeon of Moscow. There Jaunutis was baptized as Ioann, but failed to solicit help (possibly because his sister Aigusta, wife of Simeon, died the same year). Both Jaunutis and Narimantas had to reconcile with Algirdas. Jaunutis became the prince of Izyaslavl. The other brothers willingly recognised Vilnius for Algirdas.

He is presumed to have died c. 1366 because he is mentioned for the last time in a treaty with Poland in 1366, and not mentioned in a treaty with Livonia in 1367. He had three sons, Symeon Zaslawski, Grzegorz Słucki and Michal Zaslawski. Michal ruled Izyaslavl until his death on August 12, 1399 in the Battle of the Vorskla River.

== See also ==
- Family of Gediminas – family tree of Jaunutis
- Gediminids

| Preceded by Gediminas | Grand Duke of Lithuania; 1341–1345 | Succeeded by Algirdas |
