= Butautas =

Lithuanian noble (died 1380)

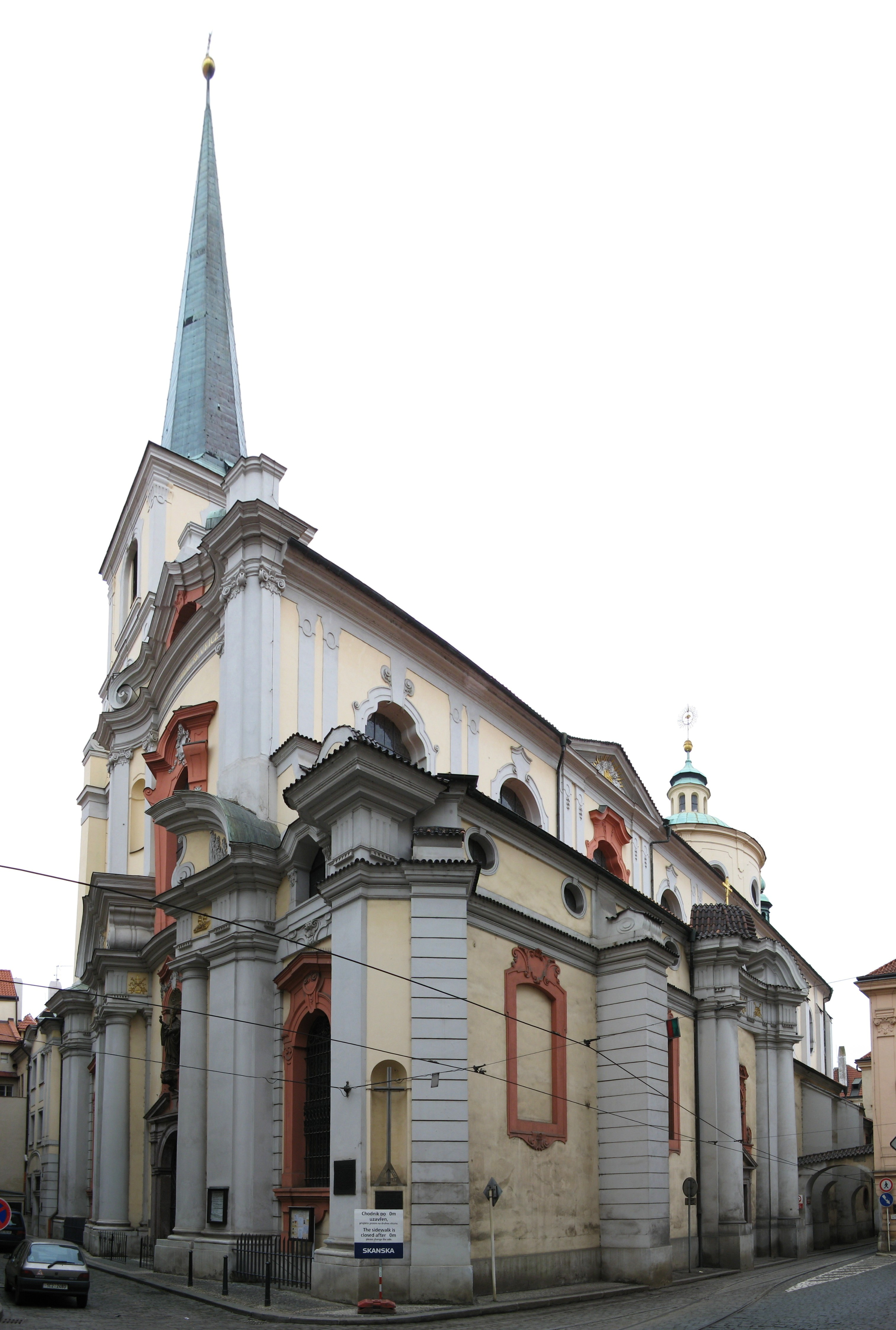
St. Thomas' Church in Prague, the burial place of Butautas

Butautas (baptized Henryk; died on May 7, 1380, in Prague) was a son of Kęstutis, Grand Duke of Lithuania. He attempted to depose his uncle Algirdas and usurp power in Lithuania, but failed and was forced into exile. He joined the court of the Holy Roman Emperor and even inspired a poem about conversion to Christianity. Butautas is sometimes confused with his brother Vaidotas.

Butautas' son Jonas Vaidutis in 1401 became the Rector of the Jagiellonian University in Kraków.

== Coup and escape to Teutonic Knights ==
The first written record about Butautas comes from Jan Długosz. The historian describes Lithuanian raids into Masuria in 1336 and mentions Butautas, son of Gediminas. Because of confused fathers, this information is not considered reliable.

The first reliable data comes from summer of 1365. While Algirdas and Kęstutis were in Volhynia helping their brother Liubartas in the Galicia–Volhynia Wars, Butautas together with other nobles attempted a coup d'état. However, the plans were discovered by Dirsūnas, deputy of Vilnius. Butautas was arrested, but his accomplice or brother Survila rescued him and killed Dirsūnas. The coup failed and Butautas, Survila, and fifteen followers had to flee to the Teutonic Knights. Historian S. C. Rowell questioned whether the coup really happened as it is mentioned only in a late German source.

In Königsberg, Butautas was baptized as Henryk in honor of the Commander of Insterburg on July 25, 1365. Two Bishops, John of Warmia and Bartholomew of Sambia were summoned for the ceremony, also attended by English crusaders, including Earl of Warwick and Thomas Ufford. In August, he led a Teutonic raid deep into Lithuania reaching as far as Vilnius and Vilkmergė. During the 12-day raid Kernavė and Maišiagala were devastated.

== Life at emperor's court ==
Sometime between August 1366 and April 1368, Butautas departed to Prague to join the court of Charles IV, Holy Roman Emperor. Survila remained with the Knights. Charles gave Butautas lands and the noble title of duke (Herzog). Butautas is mentioned as a witness to several treaties and companion of the emperor on several trips, including one to Italy to Pope Urban V. He witnessed imperial charters issued in Modena, Lucca, Rome, Udine, Prague, Tangermünde, and Jerichow. This last charter listed Butautas as "King of Lithuania" together with imperial family and before papal legates and other Bohemian dukes. At some point, the court was visited by German poet Schondoch who later composed a poem how an unnamed "Lithuanian king" was converted into Christianity.

Charles died in 1378. Just two years later Butautas died in Prague and was buried in St. Thomas' Church. In 1413, his brother Vytautas the Great ordered Requiem Mass and gave the church a large carpet. Because of this activity sometimes 1413 is given as Butautas' date of death.

== Family ==
It is known that Butautas left one son, Jonas Vaidutis, in Lithuania. He also emigrated to the West in 1381 at the age of sixteen. After his father's death he studied in Prague. In 1401, after his return to Poland, his cousin Jogaila, King of Poland, appointed him as the Rector of the Jagiellonian University in Kraków. Jonas Vaidutis died in 1402.

== See also ==
- Gediminids
- House of Kęstutis – family tree of Butautas
