= Prabuty =

Town in Pomeranian Voivodeship, Poland

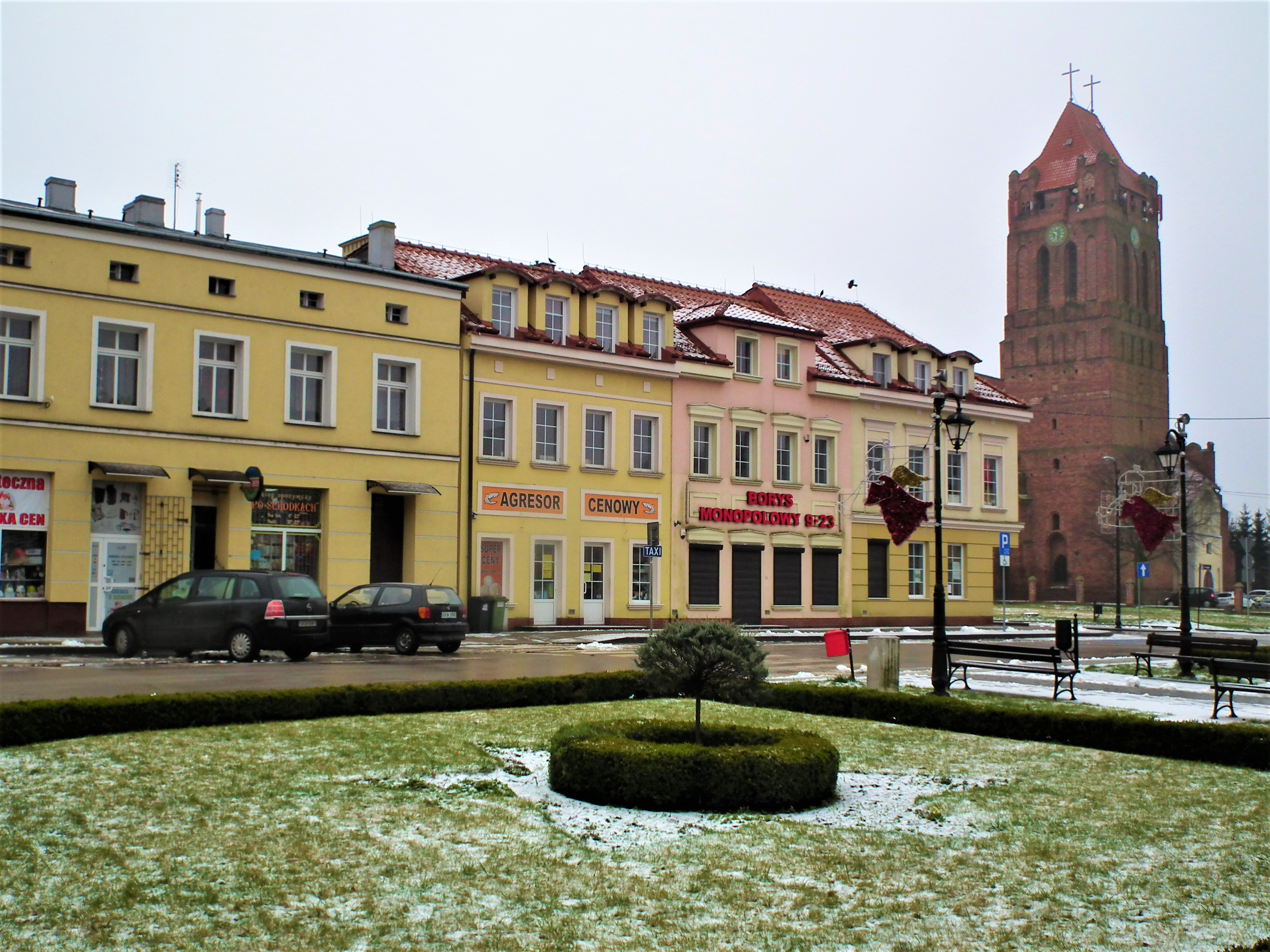
- Rynek (Market Square) in Prabuty

- Flag Coat of arms

- Location within Poland
- Coordinates: 53°45′21″N 19°11′51″E
- Country: Poland
- Voivodeship: Pomeranian
- County: Kwidzyn
- Gmina: Prabuty
- First mentioned: 1236
- Town rights: 1330

Government
  - Mayor: Marek Szulc

Area
  - Total: 7.92 km^{2} (3.06 sq mi)
- Elevation: 90 m (300 ft)

Population (2006)
  - Total: 8,488
  - Density: 1,070/km^{2} (2,780/sq mi)
- Time zone: UTC+1 (CET)
  - Summer (DST): UTC+2 (CEST)
- Postal code: 82–550
- Area code: +48 55
- Car plates: GKW
- Website: http://www.prabuty.pl

Prabuty [praˈbutɨ] (German: Riesenburg) is a town in Kwidzyn County within the Pomeranian Voivodeship of northern Poland. It is the seat of Gmina Prabuty.

== Geographical location ==
Prabuty is located between the Liwieniec and Sowica lakes, approximately 18 kilometers east of Kwidzyn, 100 kilometers southeast of Gdańsk, 100 kilometers west of Olsztyn, and 133 kilometers southwest of Kaliningrad.

Prabuty is a rail junction on the Warsaw–Gdynia railway.

== History ==
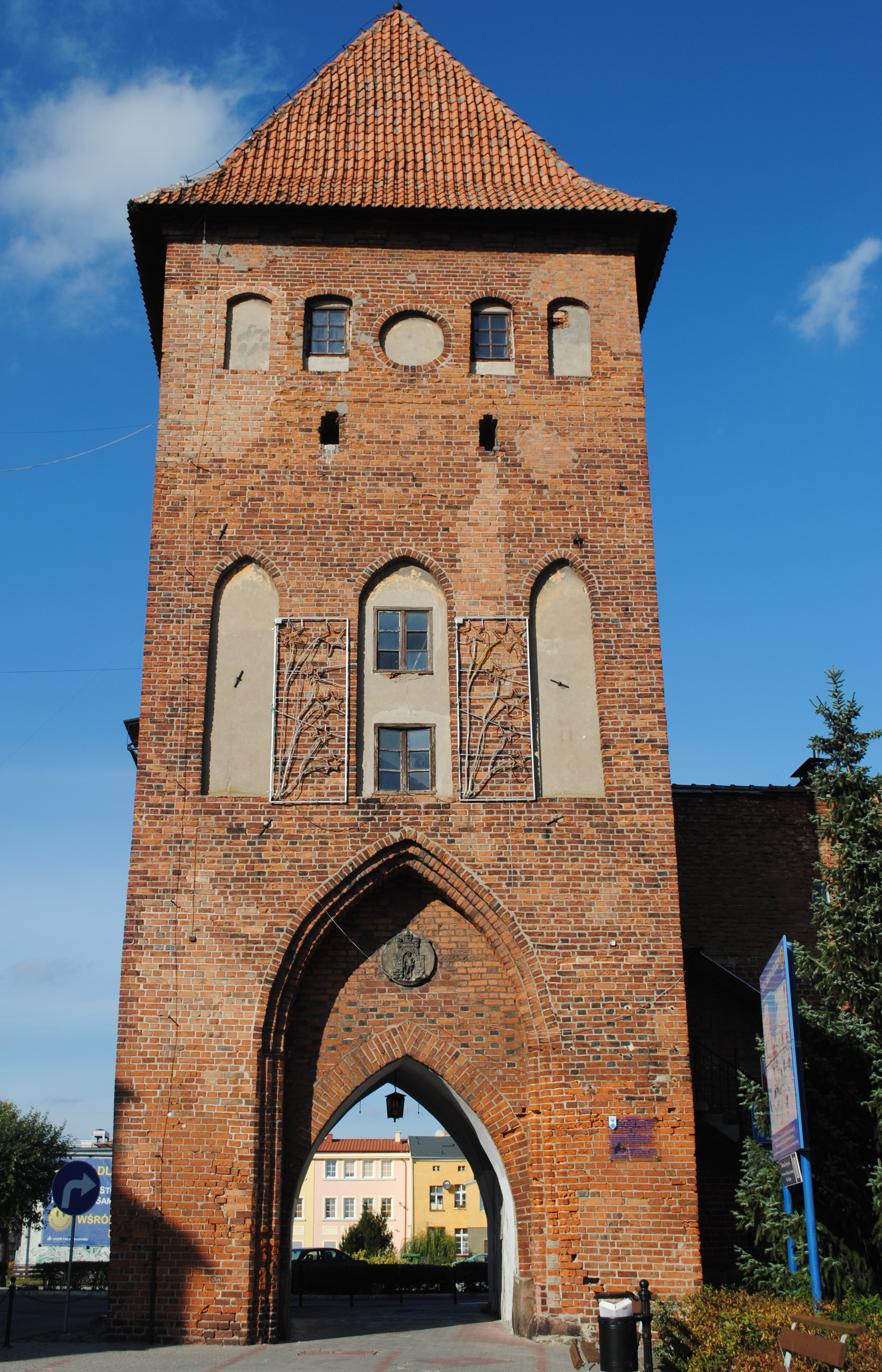
Kwidzyn Gate (Brama Kwidzyńska)

In 1236, the Teutonic Knights under Henry III, Margrave of Meissen, destroyed an Old Prussian fortress between the lakes Dzierzgoń and Liwieniec. The settlement was first mentioned in 1250 as Riesenburg. Albert, the Bishop of Pomesania, founded the castle and town in 1270 and moved his seat there. It would remain the primary seat of the Bishop of Pomesania until the diocese dissolved in 1587. The village grew around the castle and received Culm law city rights on 30 October 1330 from bishop Rudolf of Pomerania (1322–1332). The town suffered a fire in August 1375. The Lithuanian dukes Švitrigaila and Vaidutis visited the town in 1379 and 1381 respectively. In 1410 and 1414 it was captured by the Poles.

Knights and squires of the Prabuty district were co-founders of the anti-Teutonic Prussian Confederation in 1440. Since its establishment, part of the population wanted the town to join the organization. In 1451, the town council eventually joined the Prussian Confederation, but bishop Kaspar Linke expelled the councilors and confiscated their property. The town was accepted again by the organization in February 1454, and upon the request of the organization, in March 1454, Polish King Casimir IV Jagiellon incorporated the region and town to the Kingdom of Poland, and the Thirteen Years' War broke out. The Bishop and canons of Pomesania also pledged allegiance to the Polish King. Around that time, the town was mentioned in documents as Prabuth. After the Battle of Chojnice, in which Polish forces were defeated, the town was forced to side with the Order again. After the war and the Second Peace of Thorn (1466), the town became a part of Poland as a fief, and Pomesanian bishops retained their rule over the area. In 1523, the diocese of Pomesania became Lutheran. In 1525 the town became part of Ducal Prussia, a vassal state of Poland. In 1556, a synod was held in the town. In 1587, with the secularization of the diocese of Pomesania, the town lost its status as the episcopal seat.

The town suffered during the 17th century Polish-Swedish wars. In 1628, half of it was burnt down, and in 1688 the remainder was burned. In 1722, fire caused destruction once again.

In 1701, as part of Ducal Prussia, the town became a part of the Kingdom of Prussia and part of the newly created province of West Prussia in 1773. Despite this, as of 1789, Polish Protestant church services were still held in the town, and there was a Polish municipal school there. In October 1831, several Polish cavalry and infantry units and honor guards of the November Uprising stopped in the town on the way to their internment places. In 1871, the town became part of the German Empire in the framework of the Prussian-led unification of Germany. Until 1919, Riesenburg belonged to the administrative district of Regierungsbezirk Marienwerder in the Province of West Prussia.

After World War I, a referendum was held concerning the future nationality of the town, which remained part of Weimar Germany. From 1920 to 1939, Riesenburg belonged to the administrative district of Regierungsbezirk Westpreußen in the Province of East Prussia and from 1939 until 1945 to the district of Regierungsbezirk Marienwerder in the province of Reichsgau Danzig-West Prussia.

During World War II Germany operated a prisoner-of-war camp in the town. The town was captured by the Soviet Red Army in 1945 in the final months of the war. It then became part of Poland. Most of the German inhabitants were expelled and the pre-war Polish population was joined by Poles displaced from former eastern Poland annexed by the Soviet Union.

Heinz Heydrich (1905–44), brother of Reinhard Heydrich, is buried in the local military cemetery, according to the Deutsche Dienststelle (WASt).

Historic churches in Prabuty

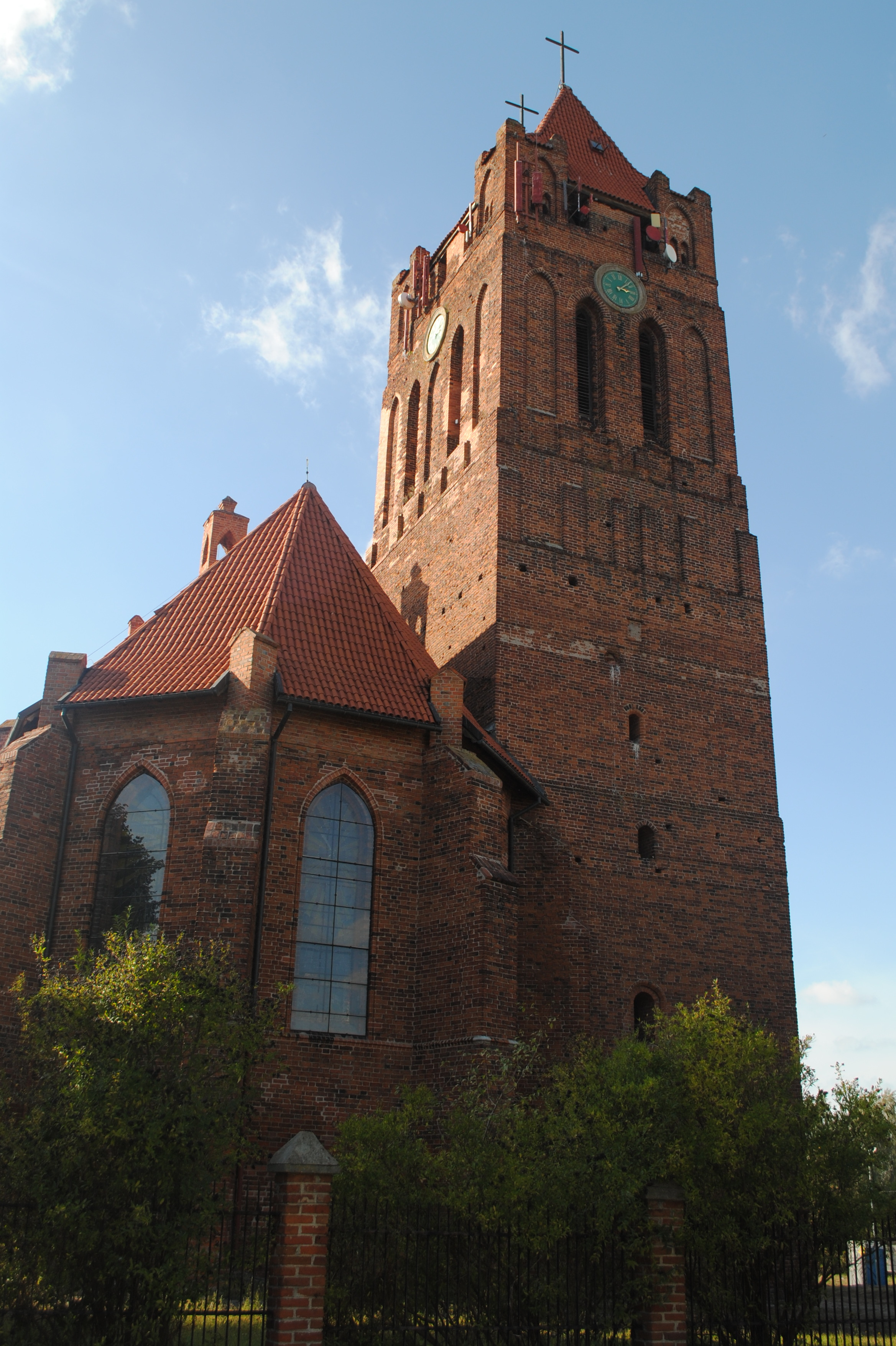
St. Adalbert Co-cathedral

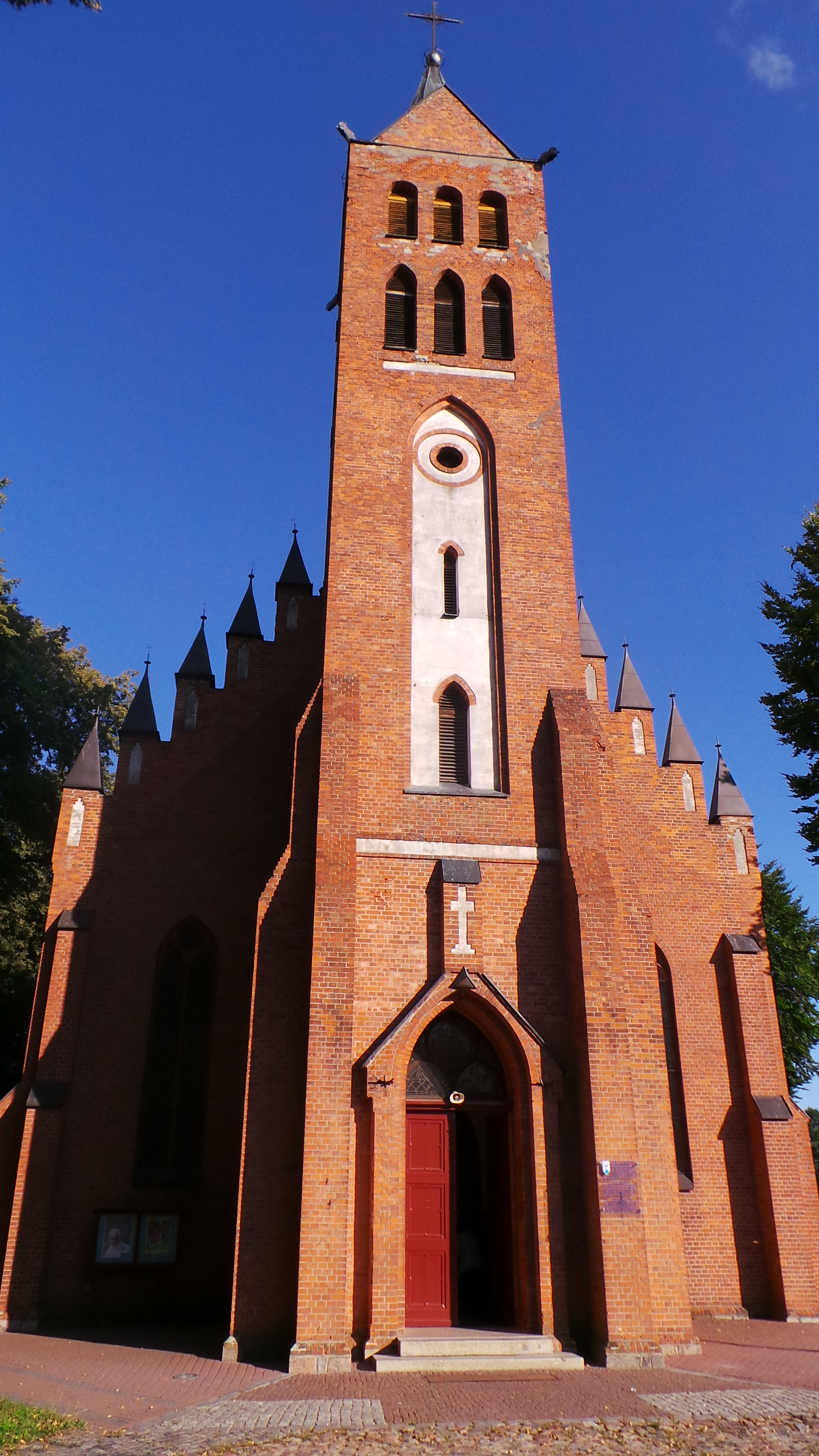
Saint Andrew church

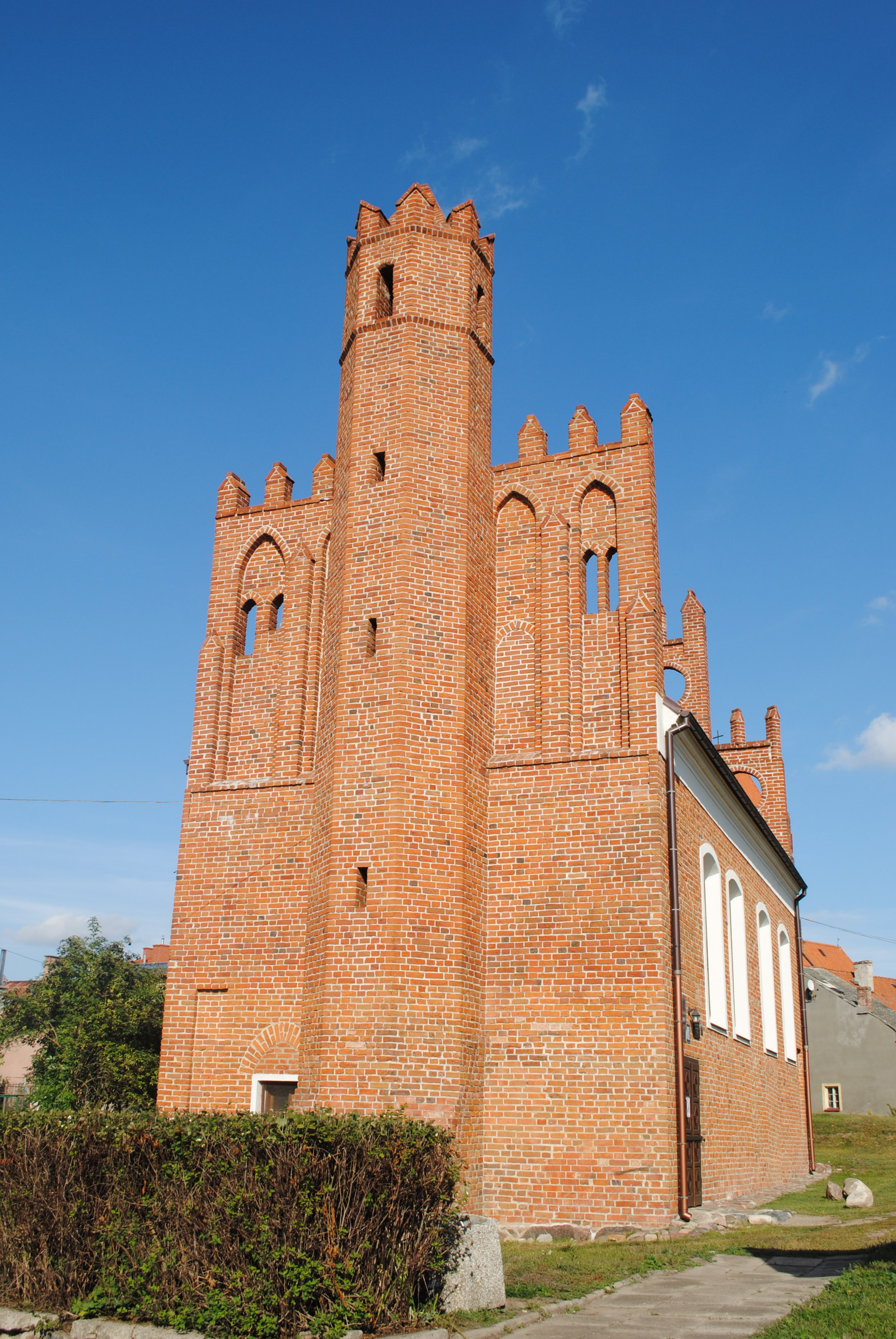
Saint Mary chapel

== Number of inhabitants by year ==
Year	Number
1777	1,797
1782	1,878
1831	2,722
1875	3,542
1880	3,718
1890	4,586
1900	5,032
1905	4,826
1925	5,340
1933	6,116
1939	8,093
2006	8,488

== Sports ==
The local football club is Pogoń Prabuty. It competes in the lower leagues.

== Notable residents ==
- Peter I, Grand Duke of Oldenburg (1755–1829) the Regent of the Duchy of Oldenburg for his incapacitated cousin William I from 1785 to 1823 and then served himself as Duke from 1823 to 1829.
- Adolf Treichel (1869–1926), German politician, President of the Volkstag (Free City of Danzig)
- Jan Wittstock (1886–1962), Polish activist
- Charlotte Wolff (1897–1986) a German-British physician who worked as a psychotherapist and wrote on sexology and hand analysis. Her writings on lesbianism and bisexuality were influential early works in the field.
- Stanisław Żyrek (1936–2010), Polish sculptor
- Jerzy Weinberger (born 1940), Polish jurist, former member of the State Tribunal of Poland
