= Charlotte Wolff =

German physician

Charlotte Wolff (30 September 1897 – 12 September 1986) was a German-British physician who worked as a psychotherapist and wrote on sexology and hand analysis. Her writings on lesbianism and bisexuality were influential early works in the field.

== Life and career ==
Charlotte Wolff was born on 30 September 1897 in Riesenburg, West Prussia (now Prabuty, Poland) into a liberal middle-class Jewish family. She was educated in Danzig (now Gdańsk) and at the Viktoria Schule, a Realgymnasium (girls' academic secondary school) in Dresden. In 1920 she entered the University of Freiburg to study literature and philosophy; at the time she was writing poetry, some of which she published. She changed her academic focus to medicine and after further study at Königsberg (now Kaliningrad, Russia) and Tübingen, completed a degree as a physician at Berlin in 1926. Remaining in Berlin, she did her internship treating sex workers at the Rudolf Virchow Hospital, then in addition to private practice as a physician and psychotherapist, worked in clinics in working-class districts and did voluntary work in family planning. She became deputy director for pre-natal services and in 1932, director of the Institute for Electro-physical Therapy at the Neukölln clinic.

As a Jew, she could no longer work after the Nazis came to power and emigrated to France, where she lived with friends in Paris and the artist's community of Sanary-sur-Mer. Forbidden to practise medicine there, she made a living from hand analysis. In 1936 she emigrated again to England, where she lived for the rest of her life, becoming a permanent resident in 1937 and taking British citizenship in 1947. She conducted psychological research at the Jewish Child Guidance Clinic and University College London, and was able to practise as a psychotherapist, becoming a Fellow of the British Psychological Society in 1941, but not again as a physician until 1952. During World War II, she worked in hospitals and mental institutions while continuing to publish her research.

Wolff was an active lesbian as early as her student days; in Berlin she had an "Aryan" partner who left her for fear of the Nazis. In the 1970s, translations of her books led German lesbian groups to seek her out and invite her to speak in Germany.

In Germany, she was not a member of a political party but joined the Association of Socialist Physicians (Verein Sozialistischer Ärzte) and sympathised with the Independent Social Democrats. She was not a Zionist nor yet a believing or practising Jew, but resisted conversion to Christianity by one of her many Quaker friends, and identified herself as "an international Jew with a British passport". She died on 12 September 1986 in London.

== Research and publications ==
Wolff researched the hands of juvenile delinquents in England and wrote several books propounding hand analysis as a key to personality. The Human Hand (1942) was termed "a curious mixture of fact, theory, hypothesis, and conjecture" by one academic reviewer, and "unconvincing, to say the least" by another who nonetheless saw promise in the general approach, but a third wrote that it "merit[ed] serious reading." The disapproving reviewers noted that hand similarities had led Wolff to infer the descent of man and of Capuchin monkeys from a common origin in the Americas.

In her book The Human Hand Wolff expressed racist and ableist views. She referred to the anthropologists and race theorists Rudolf Martin and Otto Schlaginhaufen. Wolff suggested, one can see at the size of the thumbs, that black people are less developed than white people: "(…) adult Negroes have smaller thumbs than white men. As power of consciousness is more highly developed in Europeans than in Negroes, the anatomical difference tallies with the psychological significance of the thumb." Wolff compared the palms of a gorilla to those of a mentally handicapped man. Wolff concluded that the disabled man is mentally inferior to the gorilla: "As compared with the gorilla the idiot appears to be the less differentiated and developed being."

Her later book, The Hand in Psychological Diagnosis (1951) was evaluated as the result of "serious, extensive, devoted study" but having the defect of other versions of constitutional psychology of tending to shortcuts via the classification into "types".

After starting on the first of two autobiographies in the 1960s, she changed the focus of her research to sexology and in 1971 published Love Between Women, one of the first studies of lesbianism. Her Bisexuality (1977) was based on interviews with 150 self-identified bisexuals, equal numbers of men and women; a reviewer at the time found it "fascinating reading". She argued that bisexuality was the natural human state, self-definition as heterosexual or homosexual the result of "brainwashing".

Shortly before her death she published a biography of Magnus Hirschfeld which has been regarded as her most important work.

She also wrote novels, including An Older Love (1976), which is about two older women who are attracted to each other.

In 2004, Christa Wolf published letters she and Wolff had exchanged as Ja, unsere Kreise berühren sich.

== Selected publications ==
- Tr. O. M. Cook. Studies in Hand-Reading. London: Chatto & Windus, 1936. OCLC 6539227
- The Human Hand. London: Methuen, 1942. 3rd ed. 1949. OCLC 717390963
- A Psychology of Gesture. London: Methuen, 1945. 2nd ed. 1948 repr. New York: Arno, 1972. ISBN 9780405031472
- The Hand in Psychological Diagnosis. London: Methuen, 1951. OCLC 14651959
- Love Between Women. London: Duckworth, 1971. OCLC 568668143
- Tr. Christel Buschmann. Psychologie der lesbischen Liebe: Eine empirische Studie der weiblichen Homosexualität. rororo 8040. Reinbek bei Hamburg: Rowohlt, 1977. ISBN 9783499680403 (in German) (Translation of Love between Women)
- Bisexuality: A Study. London: Quartet, 1977. Rev. ed. 1979, ISBN 9780704332539
- Magnus Hirschfeld: A Portrait of a Pioneer in Sexology. London/New York: Quartet, 1986. ISBN 9780704325692
- Manfred Magg. Professionelles Handlesen: Studien der Surrealisten in Paris mit Biografien und Horoskopen. Tuebingen: Chiron, 2024. ISBN 978-3899972986 (in German) (Translation of Studies in Hand-Reading)
