= Gediminids =

Lithuanian royal dynasty

- Columns of Gediminas
- Parent house: Palemonid dynasty
- Country: Grand Duchy of Lithuania
- Founded: 1315 or 1316
- Founder: Gediminas
- Final ruler: Sigismund II Augustus (hereditary); Anna Jagiellon (elective)
- Titles: Grand Duke of Lithuania; King of Poland; King of Hungary; King of Bohemia (and prince-elector); King of Dalmatia; King of Rama; King of Slavonia; King of Croatia; Duke of Silesia; Duke of Ruthenia; Duke of Luxembourg; Queen consort of Sweden
- Cadet branches: Jagiellonian dynasty Kęstutaičiai; Trubetskoy family House of Golitsyn

The House of Gediminas (Lithuanian: Gediminaičių dinastija), or simply the Gediminids, (Note: Lithuanian: Gediminaičiai; Samogitian: Gedėmėnātē; Belarusian: Гедзімінавічы, romanized: Hyedziminavichy; Polish: Giedyminowicze; Ukrainian: Гедиміновичі, romanized: Hedyminovychi; Russian: Гедиминовичи, romanized: Gediminovichi.) were a dynasty of monarchs in the Grand Duchy of Lithuania that reigned from the 14th to the 16th century. A cadet branch of this family, known as the Jagiellonian dynasty, reigned also in the Kingdom of Poland, Kingdom of Hungary and Kingdom of Bohemia. Several other branches ranked among the leading aristocratic dynasties of Poland and Russia into recent times.

Gediminas' Cap was used during the inaugurations of Gediminids as Lithuanian monarchs in the Vilnius Cathedral and symbolized the dynasty's continuity.

Their monarchical title in Lithuanian primarily was, by some folkloristic data, kunigų kunigas ("Duke of Dukes"), and later on, didysis kunigas ("Great/High Duke") or, in a simple manner, karalius or kunigaikštis. In the 18th century, the latter form was changed into tautological didysis kunigaikštis, which nevertheless would be translated as "Grand Duke" (for its etymology, see Grand Prince).

While some Gediminid rulers are referred as "kings" by contemporary sources, Lithuania during their era was never recognized as kingdom by Catholic Europe. Therefore, its rulers were not treated there as equal to Catholic kings - although they wielded the same amount of power and authority - and in the modern historiography the pre-Gediminid monarch Mindaugas is widely recognized as the only Lithuanian King.

== Origin ==
The origin of Gediminas himself is much debated. Some sources say he was Vytenis' ostler, others that he was of peasant stock. Some historians consider him as the son or grandson of Lithuanian or Yatvingian king/duke Skalmantas. Most scholars agree, however, that Gediminas was Vytenis' brother (the parentage of Vytenis is explained differently in various fake genealogies, compiled from the 16th century onwards; according to the latest Polish research, his parentage cannot be established).

== Confirmed Gediminid rulers ==
Overlapping years mean coregency or anti-rule:

- Gediminas (1316–1341)
- Jaunutis (1341–1345)
- Algirdas (1345–1377)
- Jogaila (1377–1434)
- Kęstutis (1381–1382)
- Vytautas (1401–1430)
- Švitrigaila (1430–1432)
- Sigismund Kęstutaitis (1432–1440)
- Władysław (1434–1444)
- Casimir (1440–1492)
- John I Albert (1492–1501)
- Alexander (1492–1506)
- Sigismund I the Old (1506–1548)
- Sigismund II Augustus (1529–1572)
- Anna (1575–1586) – elective

== Genetics ==
Y-DNA testing of living male-line descendants has shown that the Gediminid dynasty belongs to haplogroup N-M231 (N1c1), within the L551 subclade. Haplogroup N-M231 originated in East Asia and spread westward to the South Baltic region. The Jagiellonian dynasty, a cadet branch founded by Władysław II Jagiełło, also belongs to haplogroup N-M231.

== Branches of the dynasty ==
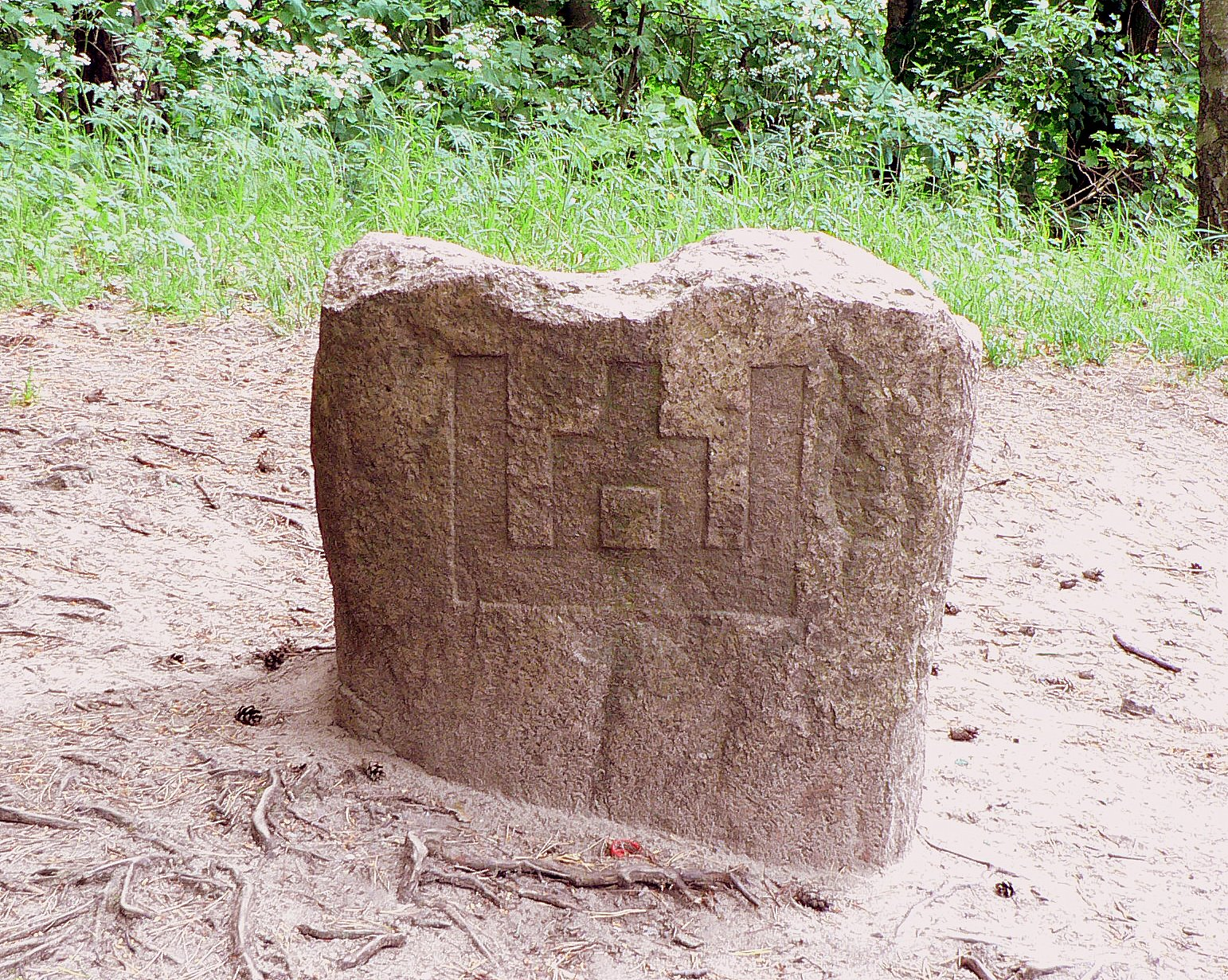
The Gediminid symbol in Rambynas Hill, Lithuania

The Eastern Orthodox branches of the family were initially Ruthenized to some extent. The majority of these families (e.g., Czartoryski) soon converted to Roman Catholicism and became Polonized. Others (e. g. the Golitsyns (Galitzine), Kurakins and Trubetskoys) moved to Muscovy, became thoroughly Russified and are among the princely families of Russia.

In Poland, some Gediminid families (such as Olelkowicz-Słucki, Wiśniowiecki, Zbaraski) are extinct, but others survive to the present: Chowański, Czartoryski, Sanguszko, Siesicki (Dowmont-Siesicki, Szeszycki), and Koriatowicz-Kurcewicz..

The Russian Gediminid families include Bulgakov, Golitsyns, Kurakins, Khovansks, Trubetzkoy, Mstislavsky, Belsky, and Volynsky. Some of these families also survive, as of 2020.

== Gediminid descendants ==
I. The descendants of *Bujwid Vytianis Rex. King Lithuania.

1. Dukes Prince of Bujwid

I. The descendants of Narimantas:

1. Dukes of Pinsky (nobility) (faded at the end of the 15th century)
  1. Dukes of Kurcewicze
    1. Dukes of Buremscy
2. Dukes of Patrikeyev
  1. Dukes of Bulgakov (nobility)
  2. Dukes of Kurcewicze
    1. Dukes of Golitsyn
    2. Dukes of Kurakin
  3. Dukes of Schentyatev (nobility)
  4. Dukes of Khovansky (nobility)
3. Dukes of Korecki
  1. Dukes of Ruzhinsky (nobility)

II. The descendants of Algirdas:

1. Duke Andrei of Polotsk
  1. Dukes of Polubinsky (nobility)
  2. Dukes of Lukomsky (nobility)
2. Dmitrijus Algirdaitis
  1. Dukes of Trubetskoy (Trubchevsk)
3. Konstantinas Algirdaitis
  1. Dukes of Czartoryski
4. Vladimiras Algirdaitis
  1. Olelkaičiai (descendants of Aleksandras Olelka)
    1. Dukes of Slutsky (nobility) (faded at the end of the 16th century)
  2. Dukes of Belsky
5. The descendants of Kaributas
  1. Dukes of Zbarazhsky (nobility)
    1. Dukes of Wiśniowiecki
    2. Dukes of Voronetsky (nobility)
    3. Dukes of Nesvisky
    4. Dukes of Porytskie (nobility)
6. The descendants of Fiodoras Algirdaitis
  1. Dukes of Hurkowicze (nobility)
  2. Dukes of Kobryn
  3. Dukes of Sanguszko
7. The Jagiellons
8. The descendants of Lengvenis
  1. Dukes of Mstislavsky

III. The descendants of Kęstutis

1. Patrikas Kęstutaitis
2. Vaidotas Kęstutaitis
3. Butautas Kęstutaitis
4. Vytautas the Great
5. Tautvilas Kęstutaitis
6. Žygimantas Kęstutaitis

IV. The descendants of Jaunutis:

1. Dukes of Zaslavsky
  1. Dukes of Mstislavsky

V. The descendants of Liubartas (faded in the first half of the 15th century)

VI. Koriatowicz, descended from Karijotas

1. Dukes of Podilskyi (nobility)
2. Dukes of Volynsky (nobility)

== Family tree ==
Butegeidis Bujwid (? – c. 1292); G. Duke of Lith., c. 1285 – c. 1292
Budvydas-Pukuveras Bujwid (? – c. 1296); G. Duke of Lith., c. 1292 – c. 1296
Vytenis Bujwid (? – 1316); G. Duke of Lith., c. 1296–1316	Gediminas (c. 1275–1341); G. Duke of Lith., 1316–1341
Jaunutis (?); G. Duke of Lith., 1341–1345	Algirdas (c. 1296–1377); G. Duke of Lith., 1345–1377	Kęstutis (1297–1382); G. Duke of Lith., 1381–1382
Ladislaus (Jogaila) (c. 1351/1363–1434); G. Duke of Lith., 1377–1434; King of Poland, 1386–1434	Švitrigaila (c. 1370–1452); G. Duke of Lith., 1430–1432	Vytautas (1352–1430); G. Duke of Lith., 1401–1430	Žygimantas Kęstutaitis (? – 1440); G. Duke of Lith., 1432–1440
Jagiellon branch (Jogailaičiai)

== See also ==
- Columns of Gediminas
- Family of Gediminas
- Golitsyn family
- List of heads of state of Lithuania
- Palemonids

== Bibliography ==
- Borkowska, Urszula (2012). Dynastia Jagiellonów w Polsce (in Polish). PWN.. ISBN 978-83-01-16692-2.
