= Vaidotas =

Lithuanian noble (fl. 1362)

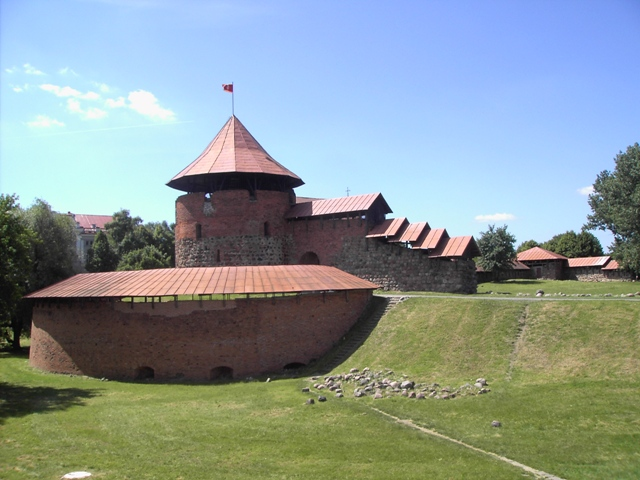
Kaunas Castle was unsuccessfully defended by Vaidotas

Vaidotas (fl. 1362) was a son of Kęstutis, Grand Duke of Lithuania. In reliable historical sources he is mentioned only twice: as defender of Kaunas Castle in 1362 and as ruler of Navahrudak. Due to very limited information, his life is subject to wide-ranging theories by historians.

== Historical mentions ==
According to the chronicles of Wigand of Marburg, he was the commander of the garrison of the newly built Kaunas Castle during the three-week siege in April 1362. After strong resistance the castle was taken over and then destroyed. Vaidotas with 36 men tried to break through, but was taken prisoner. The defeat was one of the largest and important military victories of the Teutonic Knights in the 14th century against Lithuania.

In a 1401 document his brother Grand Duke Vytautas wrote that some years before Vaidotas and his brother Tautvilas Kęstutaitis were given to rule Navahrudak equally, but it is unclear when that occurred. Historians proposed 1365 as the most likely date.

== Interpretations ==
Because of very limited historical sources, Vaidotas is sometimes confused with Vaidutis (Waydutte), son of Butautas and grandson of Kęstutis. Further confusion is introduced by the Bychowiec Chronicle, an unreliable chronicle from the 16th century, which claims that Vaidotas died in his youth in Lithuania. C. S. Rowell argued that Butautas and Vaidotas were the same person and their names were recorded differently because of different dialects.

In his 1999 monograph on the early Gediminids, Polish historian Jan Tęgowski provided the following biography of Vaidotas: he was the eldest son of Kęstutis and Birutė; was captured at Kaunas in 1362, but returned before 1365 and received Navahrudak; converted to Eastern Orthodoxy and was baptized as Ivan; had two sons Jerzy and Konrad; in 1384, during the Lithuanian Civil War (1381–84), accompanied Vytautas to the Teutonic Order; in 1389, visited the Order as Vytautas' envoy; died after 1390. Many of these conclusions are based on many conjectures and the assumptions that Ivan accompanying Vytautas is not Ivan Olshansky, that son Jerzy is not Jerzy Narymuntowicz, and that son Konrad is not Tautvilas Kęstutaitis.

== See also ==
- House of Kęstutis – family tree of Vaidotas
- Motorised Infantry Brigade Iron Wolf – one of its battalions is named after Duke Vaidotas

== Literature ==
- Jankauskas, Vytas (6 November 2024). "Naujos žinios apie kunigaikštį Vaidotą Kęstutaitį 1363 metais / New Data on Duke Vaidotas Kęstutaitis in 1363" [Нові дані про герцога Вайдотаса Кєстутаїтіса в 1363 році]. Lituanistica. 70 (3). doi:10.6001/lituanistica.2024.70.3.2. ISSN 2424-4716.
