= Simeon of Moscow =

Russian ruler (1317–1353)

Simeon the Proud
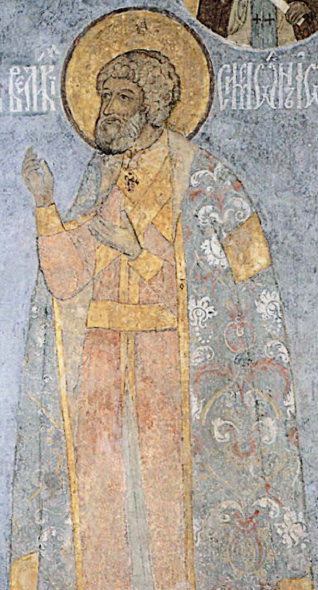
- Portrait from the Cathedral of the Archangel (17th century)

Grand Prince of Vladimir
- Reign: 31 March 1340 – 27 April 1353
- Coronation: 31 March 1340
- Predecessor: Ivan I
- Successor: Ivan II

Prince of Moscow
- Reign: 31 March 1340 – 27 April 1353
- Coronation: 31 March 1340
- Predecessor: Ivan I
- Successor: Ivan II
- Born: 7 September 1317; Moscow, Duchy of Moscow
- Died: 27 April 1353 (aged 35); Moscow, Duchy of Moscow
- Burial: Cathedral of the Archangel
- Consort: Aigusta Anastasia of Lithuania; Eupraxia of Smolensk; Maria of Tver
- Issue more...: 8
- Dynasty: Rurik
- Father: Ivan I of Moscow
- Mother: Helena
- Religion: Eastern Orthodox

Simeon Ivanovich (Russian: Симеон Иванович; 7 September 1317 – 27 April 1353), also known as Semyon Ivanovich (Russian: Семён Иванович), nicknamed the Proud (Russian: Гордый, romanized: Gordy), was Prince of Moscow and Grand Prince of Vladimir from 1340 to 1353.

The son of Ivan I, Simeon continued his father's policies to increase the power and prestige of his state. Simeon's rule was marked by regular military and political standoffs against the Novgorod Republic and the Grand Duchy of Lithuania. His relationships with neighboring Russian principalities remained peaceful if not passive: Simeon stayed aside from conflicts between subordinate princes. He had recourse to war only when war was unavoidable. His reign marked a relatively quiet period for Moscow ended by the Black Death that claimed the lives of Simeon and his sons in 1353.

== Biography ==
In 1340 Simeon, the eldest son of Ivan Kalita, was stationed in Nizhny Novgorod. Upon receiving news of his father's death, Simeon and his brothers Andrey and Ivan left for the Golden Horde to seek Uzbeg Khan's patent (yarlyk) for taking over the title of Grand Prince. Rivals Konstantin of Tver and Konstantin of Suzdal also paid their homage to the Khan, claiming seniority over Moscow princes. Simeon won the patent through bribing the Khan's retinue; princes of Tver and Suzdal had to agree to his seniority; Uzbeq also extended his benevolence to Simeon's issue. He was also granted the ceremonial title epi trapezes offikios (Ancient Greek: ὁ ἐπί τραπέζης ὀφφίκιος) by the Byzantine Empire, which can be loosely translated as seneschal or stolnik.

Also in 1340, Simeon engaged in his first military standoff with Veliky Novgorod. Simeon claimed his right to collect taxes in the Novgorodian town of Torzhok. Torzhok boyars locked up Simeon's tax collectors and called for help from Novgorod. Simeon and metropolitan Theognostus hastily organized a coalition of princes against Novgorod, claiming that "They [Novgorodians] make war and peace with whomever they please, consulting no one. Novgorod regards not all Russia, and will not obey her Grand Prince", referring to Novgorod incursions into Ustyuzhna and Beloe Ozero. As the coalition forces approached Novgorodian lands, the people of Torzhok revolted against the boyars and sided with Muscovite troops. Novgorod Republic accepted the fact and ceded all taxes from the Torzhok area, estimated at 1000 roubles in silver annually, to Simeon who agreed to honor the existing civic charter.

In 1341, shortly after the dismissal of the Muscovite coalition army, Algirdas (then prince of Vitebsk, allied with prince of Smolensk) besieged Mozhaysk. News of the death of Gediminas forced Algirdas to quit the campaign before Simeon could arrange a military response. Uzbeg Khan, Simeon's sovereign, died soon afterwards; his successor, Jani Beg, secured the control of the Horde through killing his brothers. Simeon and Theognostus had to travel to the Horde again. Jani Beg reassured Simeon in his rights and let him go, but kept Theognostus hostage to extort money from the church; eventually, Theognostus was released for 600 roubles.

In 1333, Simeon married Aigusta (Anastasia), sister of Algirdas. After her death in 1345, Simeon married Eupraxia of Smolensk, but soon sent her back to her family, claiming that Eupraxia was cursed since the wedding and "appears to be dead each night". Eupraxia remarried Prince Fominsky, and Simeon married Maria of Tver; their four sons died in infancy.

Throughout the 1340s, Lithuanian and Swedish military campaigns and internal political disarray decreased the influence of the Novgorod Republic. Simeon, whose title of Grand Prince obliged him to protect Novgorod, was reluctant to do so, as if expecting the weakened republic to collapse for his own benefit. In 1347, when Novgorodians called for help against the Swedes, Simeon dispatched his brother Ivan and Constantine of Rostov; the envoys refused to fight for the Novgorodians. Simeon himself was busy with offsetting the Lithuanians' influence in the Horde, meanwhile harboring two renegade Lithuanian princes as potential claimants to the Lithuanian crown. He manipulated Jani Beg into believing that increasing Lithuanian influence had become the most important threat to the Horde. Jani Beg eventually concurred with Simeon's envoys (of Mongolian ethnicity) and extradited Lithuanian envoys to Simeon's mercy. Simeon preferred to sign a truce with Algirdas, releasing the prisoners and securing marriages between Lithuanian princes and Russian brides. The marriage of pagan Algirdas to Orthodox Uliana of Tver, unlawful from the viewpoint of the church, was nevertheless approved by Theognostus; it gave birth to Jogaila.

In 1351–1352, Simeon raised arms against Algirdas over control of small towns in the Smolensk area. This conflict, again, did not develop into an open war as Algirdas preferred negotiations to fighting. Although the first round of talks was broken by Lithuanians, Simeon secured the disputed towns for Moscow. This campaign was his last act of Simeon's life.

The Black Death was recorded in present-day southern Russia and Ukraine as early as 1346. It hit Scandinavia in 1349, Pskov at the beginning of 1352 and Novgorod in August 1352; by the end of the year, two-thirds of Pskov were reported dead. The same pattern repeated in Lithuania and north-eastern Russia. In 1353 plague arrived in Moscow, killing Theognostus, Simeon, his two sons, Simeon Simeonovich, Ivan Simeonovich and his brother Andrey who survived Simeon by six weeks.

Before his death in 1353, Simeon took monastic vows and took the name of Sozont. He installed Alexis as Metropolitan of Moscow, successor to the late Theognostus, and secured a profitable estate for Maria. Simeon's will is considered to be the first usage of paper in Russia, as parchment was used previously.

Simeon is buried in the Archangel Cathedral of the Moscow Kremlin.

== Issue ==
=== With Aigusta of Lithuania ===
- Vasili Simeonovich (12 April 1337 – 1338);
- Vasilisa Simeonova (died 20 April 1369), married Prince Mikhail Vasilievich of Kashin;
- Konstantin Simeonovich (born and died in 1341);
- A daughter who married Aleksandr of Lithuania, son of Karijotas of Poland.

=== With Maria of Tver ===
- Daniil Simeonovich (15 December 1347 – died young);
- Mikhail Simeonovich (1348 – died young);
- Ivan Simeonovich (1351 – March 1353), died at the same time as his father of the plague;
- Simeon Simeonovich (1352 – March 1353), died at the same time as his father of the plague.

== See also ==
- Bibliography of Russian history (1223–1613)
- Rulers of Russia family tree

== Bibliography ==
- Curtin, Jeremiah (2002). The Mongols in Russia. Adamant Media Corporation. ISBN 9781402100307.
- Karamzin, N. M. (1815). Istoria gosudarstva rossiyskogo (История государства российского), volume 4 chapter 10.
- Mouravieff, A. N. (2004). A History of the Church of Russia. Kessinger Publishing. ISBN 9781417912506.

Regnal titles
Preceded by Ivan I	Grand Prince of Vladimir; Prince of Moscow; 1340 – 1353	Succeeded by Ivan II
