= Gediminas =

Grand Duke of Lithuania from c. 1316 to 1341

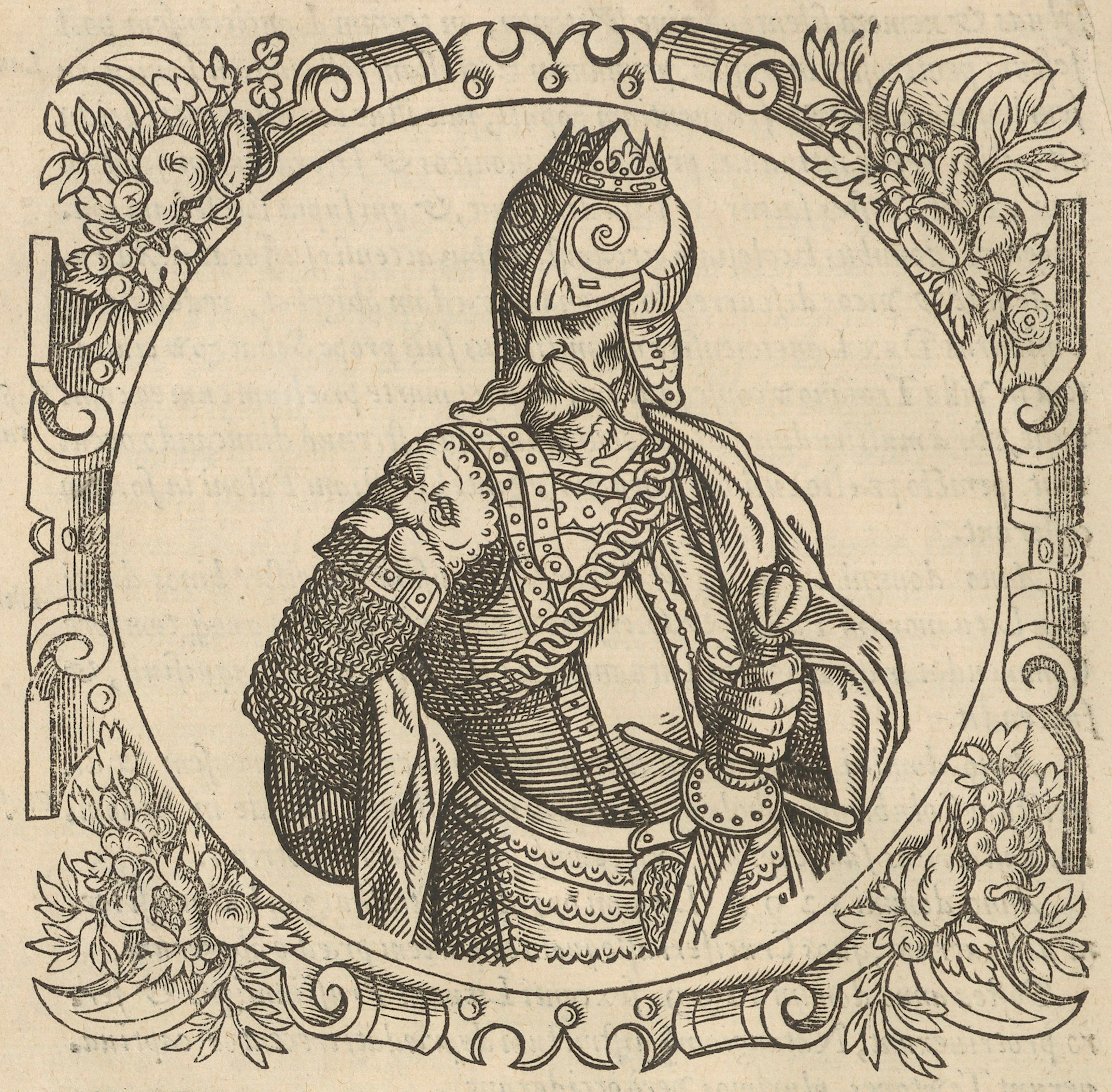
- Engraving from the "Description of Sarmatian Europe" by Alexander Guagnini, 1578.

Grand Duke of Lithuania
- Reign: 1316–1341
- Predecessor: Vytenis
- Successor: Jaunutis
- Born: c. 1275
- Died: c. 1341; Raudonė, Grand Duchy of Lithuania
- Burial: Veliuona, Lithuania
- Spouse: Vida; Jaunė
- Issue more...: Manvydas; Narimantas; Karijotas; Jaunutis; Algirdas; Kęstutis; Aldona; Liubartas
- Dynasty: Gediminids
- Father: Butvydas
- Religion: Lithuanian polytheism

Gediminas (Note: Latin: Gedeminne, Gedeminnus; Belarusian: Гедымін;) (c. 1275 – December 1341) was Grand Duke of Lithuania from 1315 or 1316 until his death in 1341. Gediminas is traditionally considered the founder of Vilnius, the capital city of Lithuania (see: Iron Wolf legend). During his reign, he brought under his rule lands stretching from the Baltic Sea to the Black Sea. The Gediminids dynasty he founded and which is named after him came to rule over Poland, Hungary, and Bohemia.

== Biography ==
=== Origin ===
Gediminas was born in about 1275. Because written sources of the era are scarce, Gediminas' ancestry, early life, and assumption of the title of Grand Duke in c. 1316 are obscure and continue to be the subject of scholarly debate. Various theories have claimed that Gediminas was either his predecessor Grand Duke Vytenis' son, his brother, his cousin, or his hostler. For several centuries only two versions of his origins circulated. Chronicles—written long after Gediminas' death by the Teutonic Knights, a long-standing enemy of Lithuania—claimed that Gediminas was a hostler to Vytenis; according to these chronicles, Gediminas killed his master and assumed the throne. Another version introduced in the Lithuanian Chronicles, which also appeared long after Gediminas' death, proclaimed that Gediminas was Vytenis' son. However, the two men were almost the same age, making this relationship unlikely.

Recent research indicates that Gediminias' ancestor may have been Skalmantas. In 1974 historian Jerzy Ochmański noted that Zadonshchina, a poem from the end of the 14th century, contains a line in which two sons of Algirdas name their ancestors: "We are two brothers—sons of Algirdas, and grandsons of Gediminas, and great-grandsons of Skalmantas." This discovery led to the belief that Skalmantas was the long-sought ancestor of the Gediminids. Ochmański posited that the poem skipped the generation represented by Butvydas, and jumped back to the unknown ancestor. Baranauskas disagrees, believing Skalmantas was Butvydas' brother rather than his father, and that Vytenis and Gediminas were therefore cousins.

Gediminas became the Grand Duke in 1316 at the age of 40 and ruled for 25 years.

=== Choice of religion ===
Gediminas inherited land consisting of Lithuania proper, Samogitia, Navahrudak, Podlasie, Polotsk and Minsk. However, these possessions were all threatened by the Teutonic Knights and the Livonian Order, which desired to conquer them. Gediminas allied himself with the Tatars against the Teutonic Order in 1319.

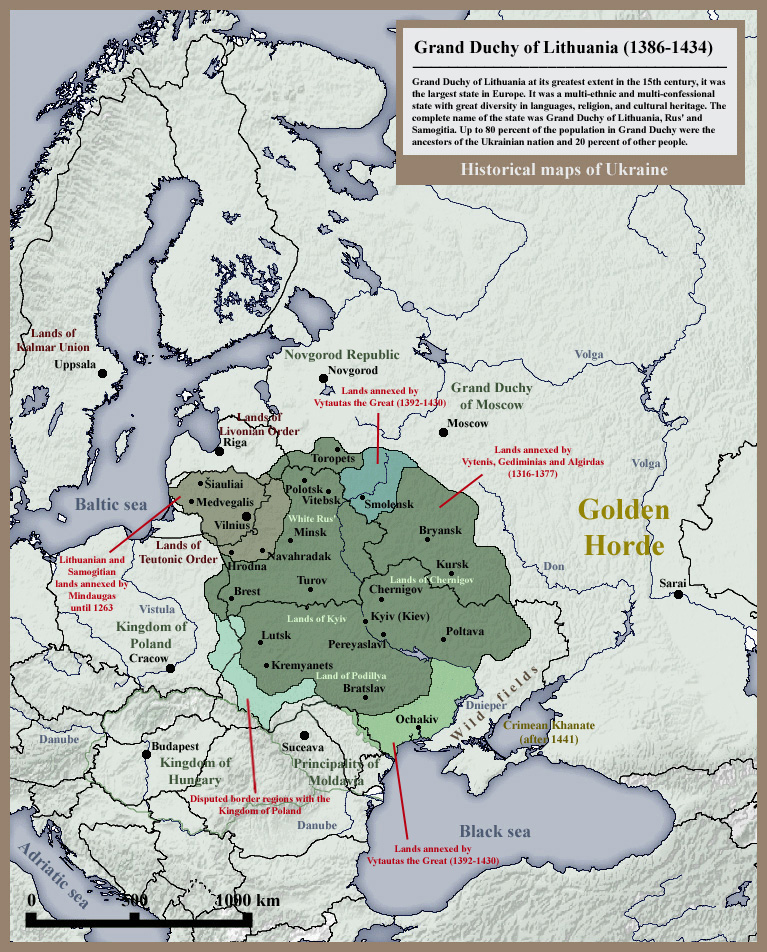
Position of the Grand Duchy of Lithuania in Eastern Europe until 1434

The systematic raiding of Lithuania by the knights under the pretext of converting it had long since united all the Lithuanian tribes. For this purpose, he entered into direct diplomatic negotiations with the Holy See. At the end of 1322, he sent letters to Pope John XXII soliciting his protection against the persecution of the knights, informing him of the privileges already granted to the Dominicans and Franciscans in Lithuania for preaching Christianity. Gediminas also asked that legates should be dispatched to him in order to be baptized. This action was supported by the Archbishop of Riga, Frederic Lobestat. Following these events, peace between the Duchy and the Livonian Order was eventually conducted on 2 October 1323.

On receiving a favourable reply from the Holy See, Gediminas issued circular letters, dated 25 January 1323, to the principal Hanseatic towns, offering a free access into his domains to men of every order and profession from nobles and knights to tillers of the soil. The immigrants were to choose their own settlements and be governed by their own laws. Priests and monks were also invited to come and build churches at Vilnius and Navahrudak. In October 1323, representatives of the archbishop of Riga, the bishop of Dorpat, the king of Denmark, the Dominican and Franciscan orders, and the Grand Master of the Teutonic Order assembled at Vilnius, when Gediminas confirmed his promises and undertook to be baptised as soon as the papal legates arrived. A compact was then signed at Vilnius, in the name of the whole Christian World, between Gediminas and the delegates, confirming the promised privileges.

On his raid upon Dobrzyń, the latest acquisition of the knights on Polish soil, gave them a ready weapon against him. The Prussian bishops, who were devoted to the knights, questioned the authority of Gediminas' letters and denounced him as an enemy of the faith at a synod in Elbing; his Orthodox subjects reproached him with leaning towards the Latin heresy, while the pagan Lithuanians accused him of abandoning the ancient gods. Gediminas disentangled himself from his difficulties by repudiating his former promises; by refusing to receive the papal legates who arrived at Riga in September 1323, and by dismissing the Franciscans from his territories. This led Gediminas to maintain paganism in Lithuania,even if more than twice as many Orthodox Christians lived in his realm than pagans.

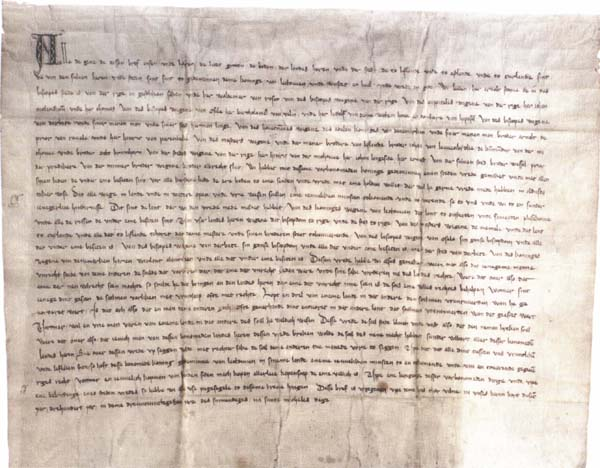
A peace agreement between Gediminas and the Order

At the same time Gediminas privately informed the papal legates at Riga through his ambassadors that his difficult position compelled him to postpone his steadfast resolve of being baptised, and the legates showed their confidence in him by forbidding the neighbouring states to war against Lithuania for the next four years, besides ratifying the treaty made between Gediminas and the archbishop of Riga. Nevertheless, disregarding the censures of the church, the Order resumed the war with Gediminas by murdering one of his delegates sent to welcome the Grand Master for his arrival to Riga in 1325. He had in the meantime improved his position by an alliance with Wladislaus Lokietek, king of Poland, and had his daughter Aldona baptized for the sake of betrothing her to Władysław's son Casimir III.

Baptizing himself would have implications for Gediminas domestically; it would have offended the staunchly pagan inhabitants of the major Lithuanian regions of Žemaitija and Aukštaitija. In addition, these heartland pagans together with the Orthodox Rus' threatened Gediminas with death if he decided to convert; a similar scenario also happened to Mindaugas, which he desperately wanted to avoid.

His strategy was to gain the support of the Pope and other Catholic powers in his conflict with the Teutonic Order by granting a favourable status to Catholics living within his realm and feigning a personal interest in the Christian religion. While he allowed Catholic clergy to enter his realm for the purpose of ministering to his Catholic subjects and to temporary residents, he savagely punished any attempt to convert pagan Lithuanians or to insult their native religion. Thus in about 1339–1340 he executed two Franciscan friars from Bohemia, Ulrich and Martin, who had gone beyond the authority granted them and had publicly preached against the Lithuanian religion. Gediminas ordered them to renounce Christianity, and had them killed when they refused. Five more friars were executed in 1369 for the same offence.

Despite Gediminas' chief goal to save Lithuania from German attacks, he still died as a pagan reigning over semi-pagan lands. Also, he was equally bound to his pagan kinsmen in Samogitia, to his Orthodox subjects in Belarus, and to his Catholic allies in Masovia. Therefore, it is still unclear whether the letters sent to the Pope were an actual request for conversion or simply a diplomatic maneuver. Nevertheless, Gediminas began a new baptism campaign in 1340–41 to prevent the Teutonic Knights aggression.

In addition from promoting paganism, the Jewish community of Lithuania prospered during his reign.

=== Incorporation of Ruthenian lands ===
"Gediminas, by the grace of God, the King of Lithuanians and Ruthenians, the ruler and duke of Semigallia."

— Gediminas's titles mentioned in his 26 May 1323 letter, which was sent to the German cities.

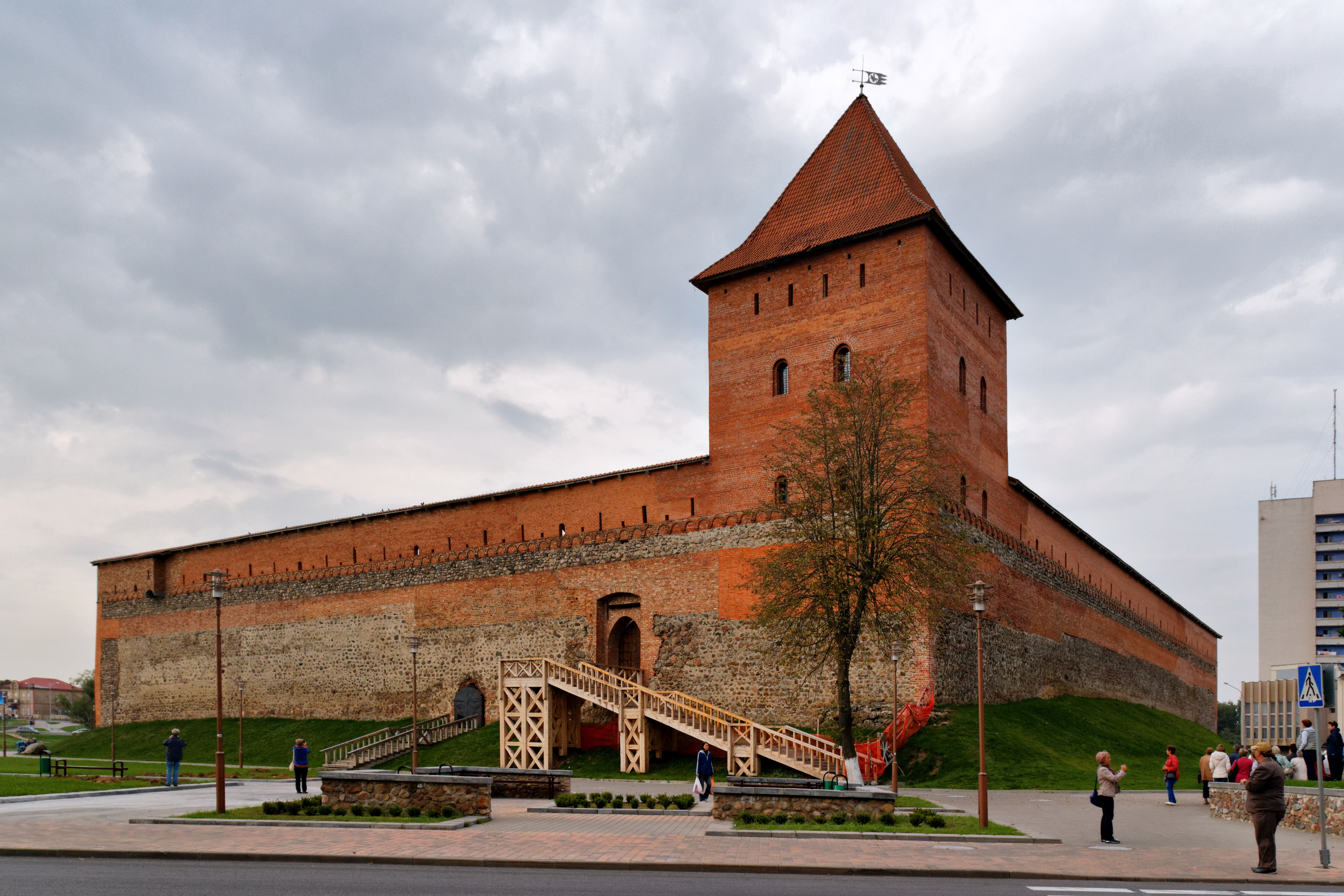
Gediminas Castle in Lida

While on his guard against his northern foes, Gediminas from 1316 to 1340 was aggrandizing himself at the expense of the numerous Ruthenian principalities in the south and east. Gediminas conquered a long series of cities across Belarus and northern Ukraine as well, but the various stages of these battles are impossible to follow. Especially from 1325 to 1340, sources about Eastern campaigns being few and conflicting, and the date of every salient event exceedingly doubtful. One of his most important territorial accretions, the principality of Halych-Volynia, was obtained by the marriage of his son Lubart with the daughter of the Galician prince.

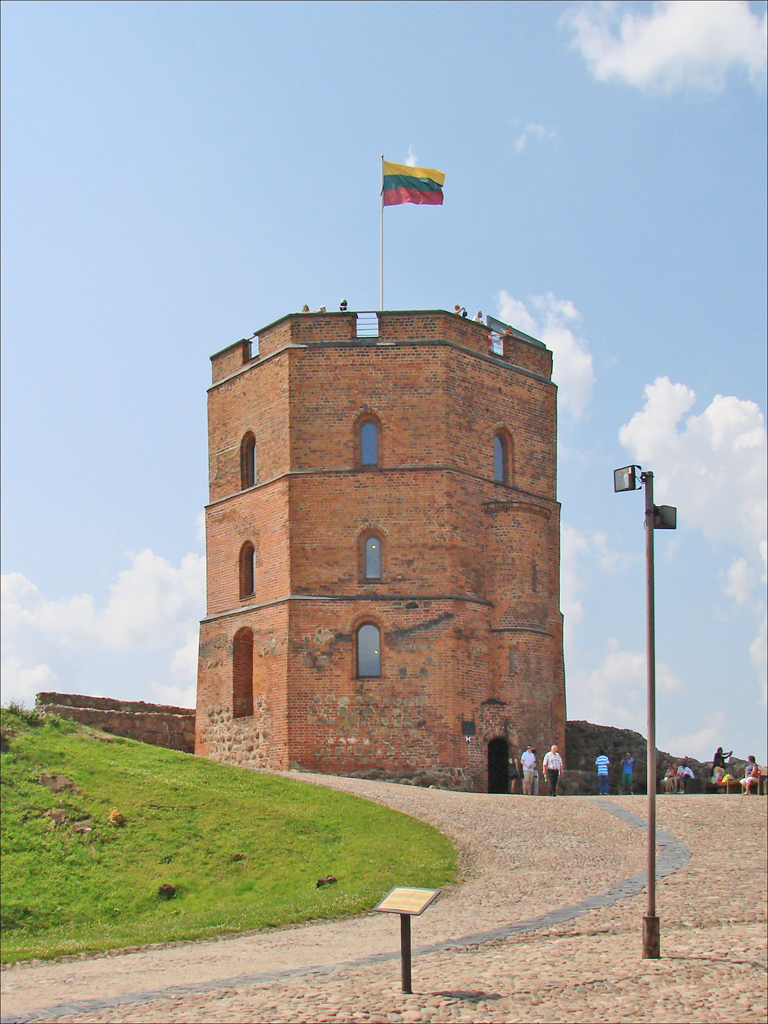
Gediminas Tower is named after the founder of Vilnius, although it was built considerably later.

From about 23 km (14 mi) south-west of Kiev, Gediminas defeated Stanislav of Kiev and his allies in the Battle on the Irpin River. He then besieged and conquered Kiev sending Stanislav, the last descendant of the Rurik Dynasty to ever rule Kiev, into exile first in Bryansk and then in Ryazan. Theodor, brother of Gediminas, and Algimantas, son of Mindaugas from the Olshanski family, were installed in Kiev. After these conquests, Lithuania stretched very close to the Black Sea.

While exploiting Ruthenian weakness in the wake of the Mongol invasion, Gediminas avoided war with the Golden Horde, a great regional power at the time, while expanding Lithuania's border almost towards the Black Sea. He also secured an alliance with the nascent Grand Duchy of Moscow by marrying his daughter, Anastasia, to the grand duke Simeon. However, Gediminas offset the influence of Muscovy in northern Russia, and assisted the republic of Pskov, which acknowledged his overlordship, to break away from Great Novgorod.

=== Domestic affairs and death ===
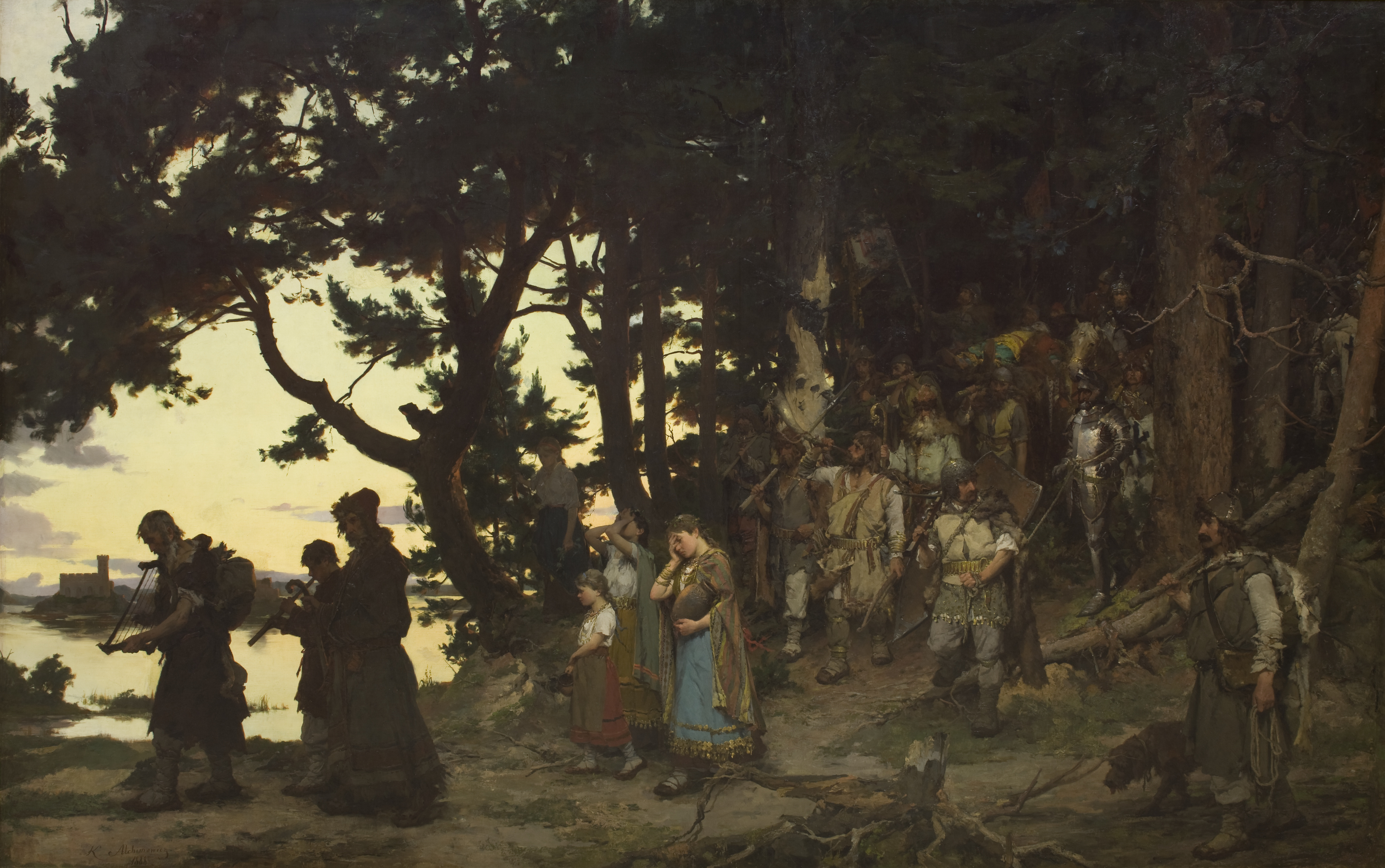
Funeral of Gediminas by Kazimierz Alchimowicz

Gediminas was known for protecting Catholics and Orthodox people in addition to pagans, and he is known for improving the efficiency of the Lithuanian Army. Also, he is known for building a chain of fortresses as well as numerous castles in towns including Vilnius. At first he moved the capital to the newly built town of Trakai, but in c. 1320 re-established a permanent capital in Vilnius.

Gediminas died in 1341, presumably killed during a coup d'état. He was cremated as a part of a pagan ceremony in 1342, which included a human sacrifice, with his favourite servant and several German slaves being burned on the pyre with the corpse.

He was succeeded by one of his sons, Jaunutis, who was unable to control the unrest in the country, as a result of which he was deposed in 1345 by his brother Algirdas.

== Legacy ==
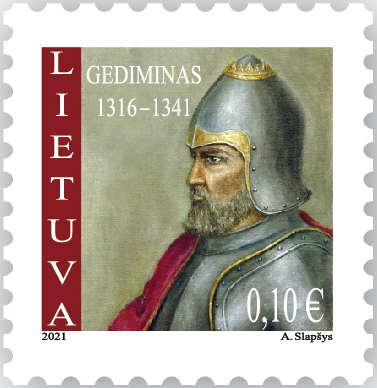
Gediminas on a 2021 stamp of Lithuania

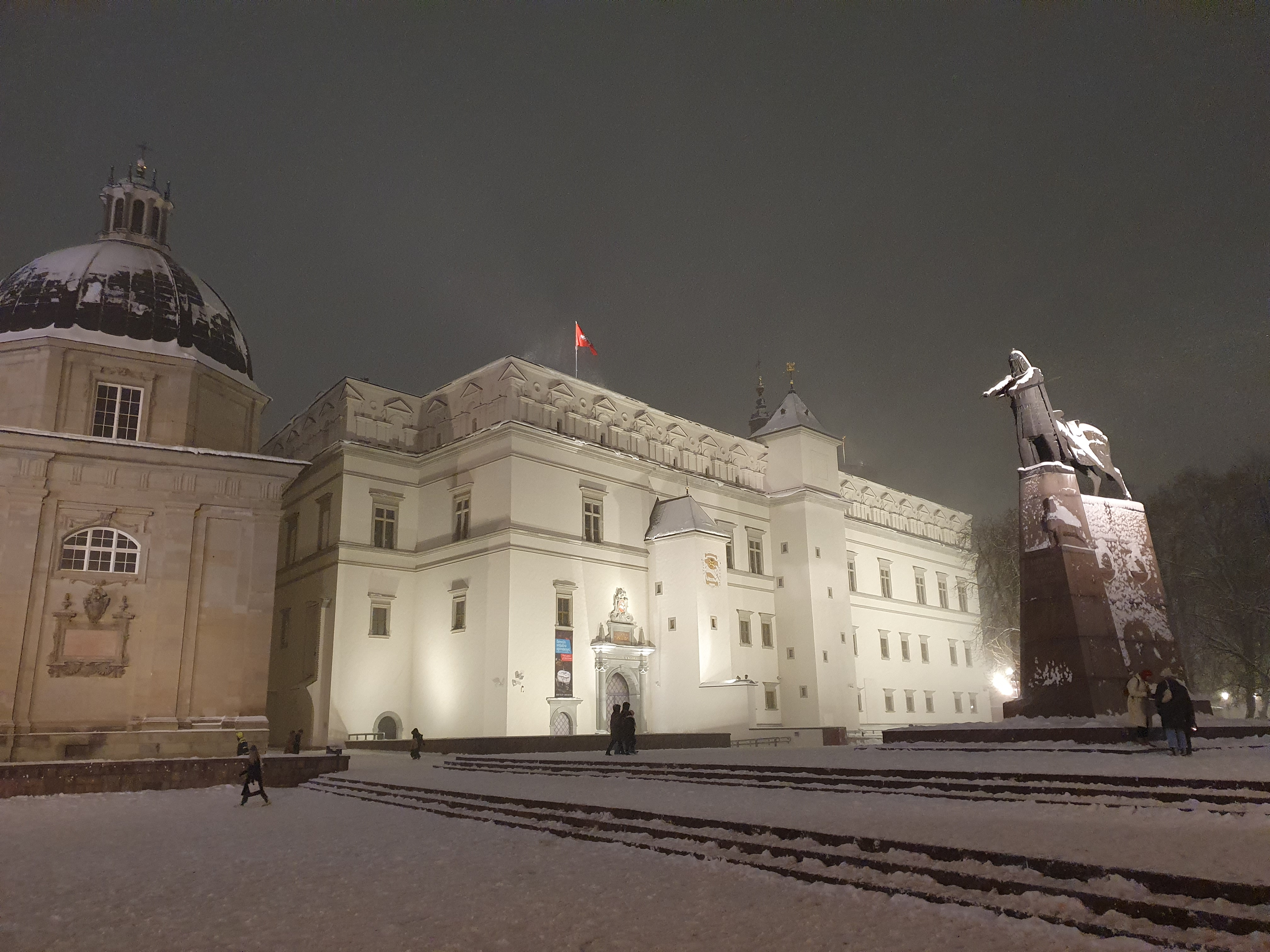
Gediminas Monument with the howling Iron Wolf in Vilnius next to the Palace of the Grand Dukes of Lithuania

He was a founder of a new Lithuanian dynasty; the Gediminids, and laid the foundations of the state's expansion while sometimes referred as the "true" state founder.

In 1862, the Millennium of Russia monument was unveiled in Novgorod with a sculpture for him on base.

In modern historiography, he is also regarded as founder of Vilnius, the modern capital of Lithuania. According to a legend, possibly set in 1322 while he was on a hunting trip, he dreamt of an iron clad wolf, who stood on a hill, howling in an odd manner as if thousand of wolves would be howling at once. He consulted his vision with his priest Lizdeika who told him the dream spoke of a city that must be built at the exact place and decided to build a fortification on the confluence of rivers Vilnia and Neris, where the place of his vision was pointed out. This event inspired the Romantic movement, particularly Adam Mickiewicz, who gave the story a poetic form.

Gediminas is depicted on a silver Litas commemorative coin, issued in 1996.

The Lithuanian folk music group Kūlgrinda released an album in 2009 titled Giesmės Valdovui Gediminui, meaning "Hymns to Ruler Gediminas".

Gediminas (as Hiedymin or Gedymin) is also widely celebrated in Belarus as an important figure of national history.

In September 2019, a monument to Gediminas was unveiled in Lida.

== Titles and symbols ==
=== Titles ===
Gediminas' normal Latin style is as follows:

- Gedeminne Dei gratia Letwinorum et multorum Ruthenorum rex

Which translates as:

- "Gediminas, by the grace of God, king of the Lithuanians and many Ruthenians"
- More titles: Illustris princeps dominus Gedemyndis Dei gratia Lethwinorum Ruthenorumque rex, rex Lithuaniae Godemundis Dei gratia Lethwinorum Ruthenorumque rex, Gedeminne Dei gratia Letphanorum Ruthenorumque rex, princeps et dux Semigallie, rex Litwinorum, illustris dominus Rex Letwinorum, Ghodeminne de koningh van Lettowen, koning Gedeminne van Lettowen, Gedeminne de koninge van Lethowen.

In his letters to the papacy in 1322 and 1323, he adds Princeps et Dux Semigalliae (Prince and Duke of Semigallia). In contemporary Low German he is styled simply Koningh van Lettowen, mirroring the Latin Rex Lethowyae (both meaning "King of Lithuania"). Gediminas' right to use the Latin rex, which the papacy had been claiming the right to grant from the 13th century onwards, was not universally recognized in Catholic sources. Thus, he was called rex sive dux ("King or Duke") in one source; Pope John XXII, in a letter to the King of France, referred to Gediminas as "the one who calls himself rex". However, the pope did call Gediminas rex when addressing him (regem sive ducem, "king or duke").

German sources also titled Gediminas as Rex de Owsteiten (English: King of Aukštaitija).

=== Seal ===
Grand Duke Gediminas's authentic symbols did not survive to this day. In 1323 Gediminas sent seven letters to various recipients in Western Europe. Their contents are known only from later copies, some of which contain a description of the Gediminas' seal. On 18 July 1323 in Lübeck imperial scribe John of Bremen made a copy of three letters sent by Gediminas on 26 May to the recipients in Saxony, his transcripts contain also a detailed description of the oval waxy seal which was attached to the letter. According to the notary's transcript, the oval seal of Gediminas had a twelve corners edging, at the middle of the edging was an image of a man with long hairs, who sat on a throne and held a crown (or a wreath) in his right hand and a sceptre in his left hand, moreover, a cross was engraved around the man along with a Latin inscription: S DEI GRACIA GEDEMINNI LETHWINOR ET RUTKENOR REG (English: Gediminas', by the grace of God, the King of the Lithuanians and the Rus' people, seal). The cross' usage in a pagan ruler's seal is explained as a diplomatic action because Gediminas did not accept baptism in his life and kept Lithuania pagan, despite several negotiations. In addition, Gediminas strictly distinguished Lithuania and Lithuanians from the region of Rus' (Ruthenia) and Rus' people (Ruthenians) in legal documents (e.g. in a 1338 Peace and Trade Agreement, concluded in Vilnius, between the Grand Duke Gediminas and his sons and the Master of the Livonian Order Everhard von Monheim).

=== Banner ===
In 1337, a Lithuanian banner is mentioned for the first time in Wigand of Marburg's chronicles, who wrote that during the battle at Bayernburg Castle (near Veliuona, Lithuania) Tilman Zumpach, head of the Teutonic riflemen, burned the Lithuanian banner with a flaming lance and then mortally wounded the King of Trakai, however, he didn't describe its appearance.

== Issue ==
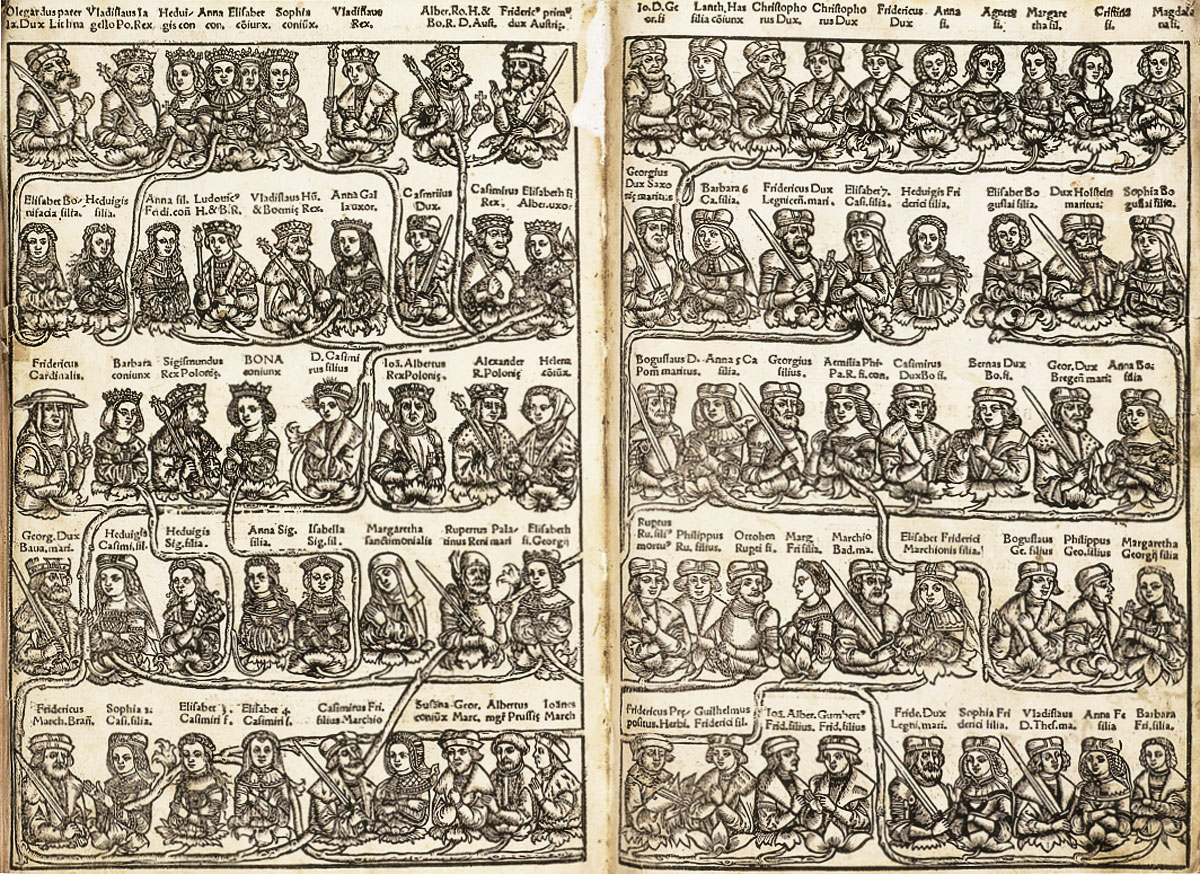
Gediminids - predecessors of the Jagiellonian dynasty (1521)

It is uncertain how many wives Gediminas had. The Bychowiec Chronicle mentions three wives: Vida from Courland; Olga from Smolensk; and Jaunė from Polotsk, who was Eastern Orthodox and died in 1344 or 1345. Most modern historians and reference works say Gediminas' wife was Jewna, dismissing Vida and Olga as fictitious, since no sources other than this chronicle mention the other two wives.

Some arguments state that Gediminas had two wives, one pagan and another Orthodox. This case is supported only by the Jüngere Hochmeisterchronik, a late 15th-century chronicle, mentioning Narimantas as half-brother to Algirdas. Other historians support this claim by arguing this would explain Gediminas' otherwise mysterious designation of a middle son, Jaunutis, as his succession would be understandable if Jaunutis were the first-born son of Gediminas and a second wife.

He is said to have left seven sons and six daughters including:

- Manvydas (Duchy of Kernavė) (c. 1288 – c. 1348)
- Narimantas (Duchy of Polatsk)
- Karijotas (Duchy of Navhrudak, Black Ruthenia)
- Jaunutis (Duchy of Zaslawye) initially ruled Vilnius after the death of his father
- Algirdas (Duchy of Vitebsk)
- Kęstutis (Duchy of Trakai and protectorate of Duchy of Samogitia)
  - Vytautas
- Maria, married Dmitry of Tver
- Aldona, married Casimir III of Poland
- Aigusta, married Simeon of Moscow
- Elžbieta, married Wenceslaus of Płock
- Eufemija, married Boleslaw-Yuri II of Galicia
- Liubartas (Duchy of Lutsk, Volhynia)

== See also ==
- Columns of Gediminas, one of the earliest symbols of Lithuania and its historical coats of arms.
- Gediminas' Cap, a cap used by the Lithuanian monarchs until 1569.
- Gediminas' Tower, a tower in Lithuania's capital Vilnius.

== Sources ==
- Akiner, Shirin (2009). Religious language of a Belarusian Tatar kitab: a cultural monument of Islam in Europe. Otto Harrassowitz Verlag. p. 457. ISBN 978-3-447-03027-4.
- This article incorporates text from a publication now in the public domain: Bain, Robert Nisbet (1911). "Gedymin". In Chisholm, Hugh (ed.). Encyclopædia Britannica. Vol. 11 (11th ed.). Cambridge University Press. pp. 548–549.
- Bugajski, Janusz (2002). Political parties of Eastern Europe: a guide to politics in the post-Communist era. M.E. Sharpe. p. 1055. ISBN 1-56324-676-7.
- Chase, Thomas George (1946). The story of Lithuania. Stratford House. p. 392.
- Christiansen, Eric (1980). The northern crusades: the Baltic and the Catholic frontier, 1100-1525. Macmillan. p. 273. ISBN 0-333-26243-3.
- Ertl, Alan W. (2008). Toward an Understanding of Europe: A Political Economic Précis of Continental Integration. Universal-Publishers. p. 560. ISBN 978-1-59942-983-0.
- Grossman, Leonid Petrovich (1979). Confession of a Jew. Ayer Publishing. p. 191. ISBN 0-405-12625-5.
- Housley, Norman (1986). The Avignon papacy and the Crusades, 1305-1378. Oxford University Press. p. 348. ISBN 0-19-821957-1.
- Ingrao, Charles W.; Szabo, Franz A. J. (2008). The Germans and the East. Purdue University Press. p. 458. ISBN 978-1-55753-443-9.
- Jones-Bley, Karlene; Huld, Martin E. (1996). The Indo-Europeanization of northern Europe. Institute for the Study of Man. p. 362. ISBN 0-941694-53-4.
- Kiaupa, Zigmantas (2000). The history of Lithuania before 1795. Lithuanian Institute of History. p. 402. ISBN 9986-810-13-2.
- Metelsky, G. (1959). Lithuania, land of the Niemen. Foreign Languages Pub. House.
- Muldoon, James (1997). Varieties of religious conversion in the Middle Ages. University Press of Florida. p. 208. ISBN 0-8130-1509-X.
- Nikžentaitis, Alvydas (1989). Gediminas (in Lithuanian). Vilnius: Vyriausioji enciklopedijų redakcija.
- Nowakowska, Natalia, ed. (2019). Remembering the Jagiellonians. Routledge. ISBN 978-1-138-56239-4.
- O'Connor, Kevin (2003). The history of the Baltic States. Greenwood Publishing Group. p. 220. ISBN 0-313-32355-0.
- Olins, Peter Z. (1928). The Teutonic knights in Latvia. B. Lamey.
- Plakans, Andrejs (2011). A Concise History of the Baltic States. Cambridge University Press. ISBN 978-0-521-54155-8.
- Pelenski, Jaroslaw (1998). The contest for the legacy of Kievan Rus. East European Monographs. p. 325. ISBN 0-521-54155-7.
- Purton, Peter (2009). A History of the Late Medieval Siege, 1200-1500. Boydell & Brewer. p. 488. ISBN 978-1-84383-449-6.
- Rowell, S. C. (1994). Lithuania Ascending: A Pagan Empire Within East-Central Europe, 1295-1345. Cambridge Studies in Medieval Life and Thought: Fourth Series. Cambridge University Press. ISBN 978-0-521-45011-9.
- Rowell, Stephen Christopher (2003). Chartularium Lithuaniae res gestas magni ducis Gedeminne illustrans (PDF) (in Latin and Lithuanian). Vilnius: Vaga. ISBN 5-415-01700-3.
- Rutter, Owen (1925). The New Baltic States and Their Future. Methuen & co. ltd. p. 274.
- Smith, Hedrick (1991). The new Russians. Random House. p. 734. ISBN 0-679-41294-8.
- Taylor, Neil (2008). Baltic Cities. Bradt Travel Guides. p. 298. ISBN 978-1-84162-247-7.
- Tęgowski, J. (1999). The first generation of Gediminas. Poznań-Wrocław.
- Turnbull, Stephen R. (2003). Tannenberg 1410: Disaster for the Teutonic Knights. Osprey Publishing. p. 96. ISBN 1-84176-561-9.
- The new encyclopædia Britannica: Volume 5.
- Slavonic and East European review, Volume 32. Modern Humanities Research Association for the School of Slavonic and East European Studies, University of London. 1953.
- Lietuvos aukštųjų mokyklų mokslo darbai: Istorija, Volume 36 (in Lithuanian). Alna litera. 1997.
- University of Colorado (1968). East European quarterly: Volume 2. University of Colorado.

Preceded by Vytenis	Grand Duke of Lithuania; 1316–1341	Succeeded by Jaunutis
