= Tautvilas Kęstutaitis =

Lithuanian noble (died 1390)

Tautvilas or Towtwil (c.1352–1355 – September 1390) was one of the sons of Kęstutis, Grand Duke of Lithuania, and a strong supporter of his brother Vytautas the Great in his struggles against their cousin Jogaila.

In 1380, Jogaila signed the secret Treaty of Dovydiškės with the Teutonic Knights against Kęstutis. This sparked a civil war. Kęstutis and his son Vytautas was captured and held prisoners in Kreva castle. In 1382 Kęstutis died under suspicious circumstances, while Vytautas managed to escape and sought allies among the Teutonic Knights. Around the same time Jogaila banished Tautvilas from Navahrudak that he and his brother Vaidotas were ruling. Tautvilas then joined the fight of his brother Vytautas. While visiting the Teutonic Knights, he was baptized as Kondrat on October 21, 1383. In 1384 Vytautas and Jogaila reconciled and the civil war ended.

When Jogaila signed the Union of Krewo and became the King of Poland, he left his unpopular brother Skirgaila as a regent in Lithuania. Vytautas saw this as an opportunity to gain power and started the Lithuanian Civil War (1389–1392). His first military campaign against Vilnius was not successful and had to turn to the Teutonic Knights for the second time. Tautvilas joined him again. Joint forces of Vytautas and the Knights attacked Vilnius in September 1390. According to the chronicles of Wigand of Marburg, Tautvilas was killed while trying to capture the Crooked Castle.

The Samogitian-Danish noble family Blinstrub of Tautvilas claim descent from Tautvilas Kęstutaitis.

== Sources ==
- (in Lithuanian) Ivinskis, Zenonas (1953–1966). "Tautvilas". Lietuvių enciklopedija. Vol. XXXII. Boston, Massachusetts: Lietuvių enciklopedijos leidykla. pp. 488–489. LCCN 55020366.
