= Principality of Izyaslavl =

The Principality of Izyaslavl or Zaslawye (Belarusian: Княства Заслаўскае) was a minor district of the former Principality of Polotsk, which it had split from in the 12th century. It split along with Polotsk, Minsk, Vitebsk, Drutsk and Logozhsk. These fragmented territories were ruled by Vseslav of Polotsk's many sons and grandsons. Later, there would be a failed attempt to unite the territory.

== See also ==
- List of early East Slavic states
