= Helena Skirmunt =

Polish painter and sculptor (1827–1874)

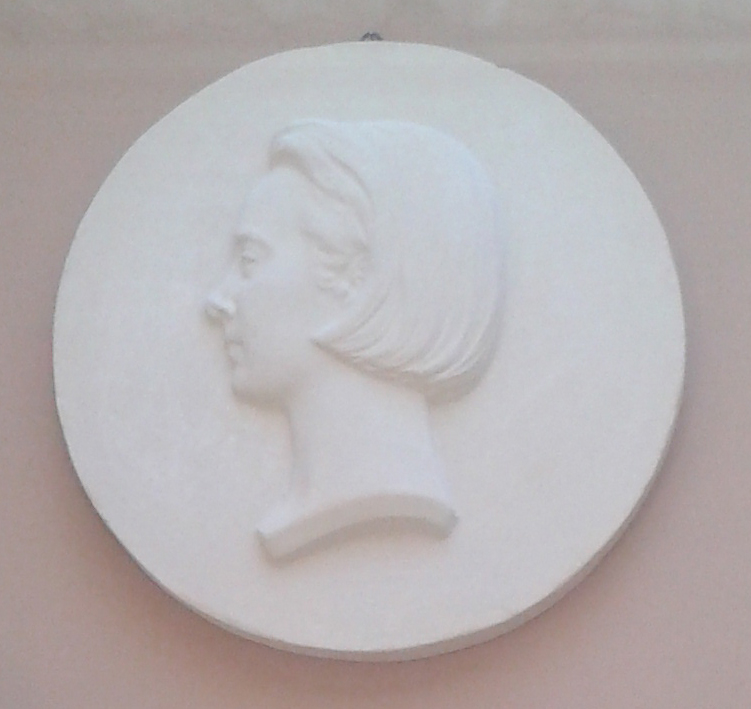
Self-portrait in the collection of the Vilnius Picture Gallery

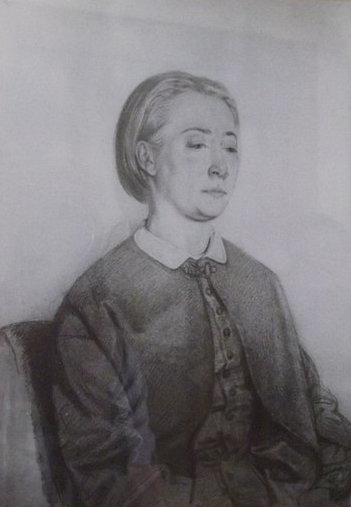
Self-portrait

Helena Skirmunt (also Skirmuntt or Skirmuntowa; Belarusian: Гелена Скірмунт; 5 November 1827 – 1 February 1874) was a Polish painter and sculptor. She was mostly self-taught though she briefly studied under several German and Italian artists. For participation in the January Uprising, she was deported to the interior of Russia and spent her last years in Crimea. As a painter she created landscapes, portraits, and religious icons; as a sculptor she completed numerous portrait medallions and religious works. In her later years she turned to historical sculpture drawing inspiration from the history of the former Grand Duchy of Lithuania. Her daughter Konstancija Skirmuntt was a well-known historian.

== Biography ==
Skirmuntt was born in 1827 in Kalodnaye between Pinsk and Stolin in present-day Belarus, then part of the Russian Empire. Her family was local nobles who traced their lineage to the 13th century. Her parents were Pinsk district marshal Aleksander Skirmunt and his wife, Hortensja Orda, sister of the painter Napoleon Orda. From an early age, Skirmunt showed great interest in painting. She received education at home from private tutors, but also studied for a few months under the landscape painter Wincenty Dmochowski in Vilnius. In 1844, she accompanied an acquaintance to Berlin, later visiting Dresden and Paris to study western art. She took lessons with Wilhelm Krause and Carl Christian Vogel von Vogelstein. In 1848, she married Kazimierz Skirmunt (uncle of Raman Skirmunt), who was also interested in painting and sculpture.

In 1852, she traveled to Vienna for a treatment of her eyes. At the same time, she studied sculpture under Josef Cesar. She also visited Italy (Rome, Milan, Florence, Naples) and took lessons with Pietro Galli and L. Amici. She created some religious works for churches, but a woman painter and sculptor was received with skepticism. In 1863, during the January Uprising, she was arrested for attempting to deliver a dispatch from General Romuald Traugutt. She was exiled to the Tambov Governorate while her husband was exiled to the Kostroma Governorate. They were allowed to reunite about after a year and settled in Kirsanov. In 1867, they were allowed to leave the exile but not allowed to settle in the former Grand Duchy of Lithuania. They moved to Balaklava in Crimea where her father-in-law had an estate with a vineyard and winery. The Crimean years were her most productive period. She contracted diphtheria, and sought treatment in Amélie-les-Bains-Palalda in France, where she died in 1874. Her remains were transported and buried in her native parish.

== Works ==
She started her artistic career with landscape paintings. She then switched to portraits, mostly of family members. Around 1850, she started working on religious art. She painted altar picture for the Piarist church in Dūkštos near Vilnius, designed altar for the church in Achova near Pinsk, restored paintings in a church in Pinsk. After her trip to Austria and Italy, she took up sculpting creating bas-relief medallions with portraits of relatives, friends and public figures, including Bronisław Zaleski (1859), Joachim Lelewel (1860), Józef Ignacy Kraszewski. In 1853–1871, she created four large crucifixes.

After the January Uprisings, her works reflect romantic nationalism. She sculpted the knight of the Lithuanian coat of arms, portraits of Lithuanian heroes (two portraits of King Mindaugas and Grand Duke Gediminas are known; the portrait of Gediminas was copied from an image published by Alexander Guagnini and was cast in bronze), and two unfinished triptychs with portraits of religious leaders (Bishops Wojciech Tabor and Merkelis Giedraitis, Saint Casimir, and Grand Duke Vytautas). Her best known work Historical Chess (a set of chess pieces) is unfinished. She completed figurines of 12 Polish and 10 Turkish soldiers of the Battle of Vienna in which Polish King John III Sobieski soundly defeated the Ottoman Empire. The work was well received at the 1873 Vienna World's Fair, and the figures were cast in bronze and gilded in silver and gold in Vienna by her former teacher Josef Cesar.

Exhibitions of her works were organized by the Kraków Society of Friends of Fine Arts (1874), in Lviv (1874/75), and in Warsaw (1876–1877 and 1883). Excerpts of her diary were published, along with a collection of letters, by Bronisław Zaleski in 1876. Her daughter published an album of her works in 1930.
