= Józef Marszewski =

Polish painter (1827–1883)

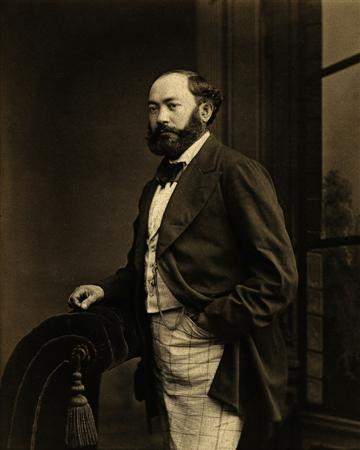
- Born: c. 1827; Vilnius, Russian Empire
- Died: 27 March 1883 (aged 55–56); Warsaw or Vilnius, Russian Empire
- Education: Imperial Academy of Arts
- Known for: Landscape painting
- Movement: Romanticism

Józef Marszewski (Lithuanian: Juozapas Marševskis, Russian: Иосиф Иванович Маршевский; c. 1827 – 27 March 1883) was a Polish-Lithuanian landscape painter. He was the grandfather of Zygmunt Marszewski, a colonel of the Polish Army.

Born in Vilnius, then part of the Russian Empire, Marszewski was educated at the Imperial Academy of Arts in St. Petersburg. Having stood out as a capable painter and friend of Ivan Shishkin, Marszewski won two silver medals for his paintings of the Neva and Ravel. After graduation, Marszewski extensively traveled Europe, painting local landscapes ranging from Spain to the Tatra Mountains, as well as portraying Vilnius and its surroundings. He often set up exhibitions in Kraków, Lviv, and Warsaw. He settled in Warsaw around 1872, however in the following year lost a large amount of money he had deposited in a bank, and as a result fell into a deep depression which would develop into a mental illness. He died either in Warsaw or Vilnius. His works are housed in the National Museum in Warsaw and National Museum in Kraków.

== Biography ==
=== Early life ===
Józef Marszewski's birth date varies in sources. According to Marszewski's biographer Wojciech Gerson, Marszewski was born on 14 March 1827 in Vilnius (then part of the Russian Empire). He was taught art by either Aleksander Kokular in Warsaw or by Wincenty Dmochowski in Vilnius, or possibly by both of them. From 1853 to 1856 he studied at the Imperial Academy of Arts in St. Petersburg under Maksim Vorobyov, where he won two silver medals for his paintings View of the Neva During the March of Ice and Revel. Alexey Bogolyubov notes that others (Alexey Chernyshev, Vasily Maksutov, Vladimir Sverchkov and himself) also worked on View of the Neva During the March of Ice painting for fun. Marszewski graduated as an artist of the 14th class of the Academy. As a student, Marszewski was friends with Ivan Shishkin.

=== Travels ===
Continuing his studies, Marszewski began traveling across Europe visiting firstly Paris and Spain. In 1858 he lived in Düsseldorf where he continued improving his skills under Andreas Achenbach. Marszewski also visited Switzerland, Rome, Courland, and the Tatra Mountains (in 1865 and 1866). He traveled to Düsseldorf again in 1864, where he stayed until around 1870, after which he moved to Paris. Despite his travels, Marszewski retained contacts with his former Academy and in 1870 received the honorary title of "Class Artist", 1st Degree, for his painting View of Menton. Marszewski regularly submitted his works for exhibitions in Kraków, Lviv, and Warsaw.

=== Later years and death ===
After returning from his travels, Marszewski usually lived in Warsaw (settled around 1872) and Vilnius, sometimes visiting modern-day Ukraine. In 1873 Marszewski lost a large amount of money he had deposited in a bank and as a result fell into a deep depression, which eventually turned into a mental illness.

Marszewski died on 27 March 1883 in Warsaw. Other sources claim he died on 27 March 1874 in Vilnius. He was buried in Vilnius, in what is now the old cemetery complex of Vilnius evangelicals. He was remembered by his contemporaries as "a seasoned landscape painter full of energy [...] an excellent artist and a much-lamented colleague [...] full of life, with sparkling black eyes, of short height, dark-haired, with wide eyebrows, he was full of enthusiasm for art and he retained his love of work for it until the end."

== Works ==
Marszewski usually painted landscapes from the lands of Italy, Germany, Spain, Ukraine, Poland and Lithuania (especially around Vilnius). As was typical of landscape artists, Marszewski treated the landscape in an emotional way with which he tried to reflect the moods prevailing in nature. It is also known that Marszewski painted religious scenes and portraits. In 1847 he also painted Passage Through Berezina, a composition depicting the Battle of Berezina.

== Gallery ==
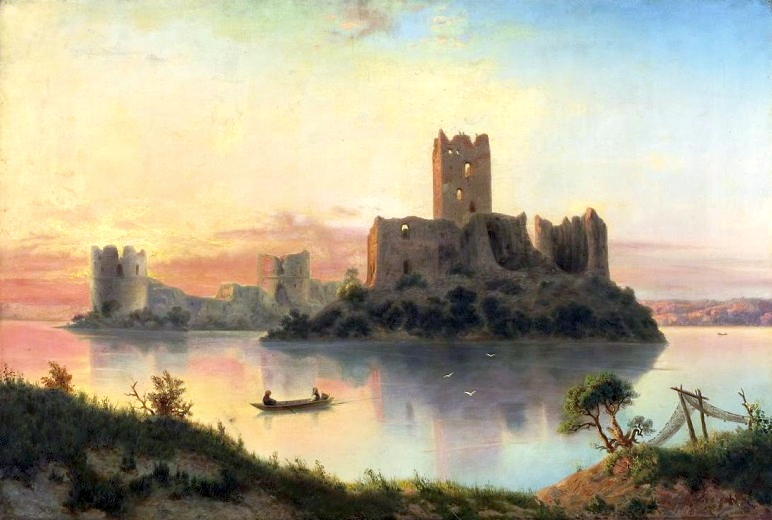
Ruins of the Trakai Island Castle at Sunset (1866)

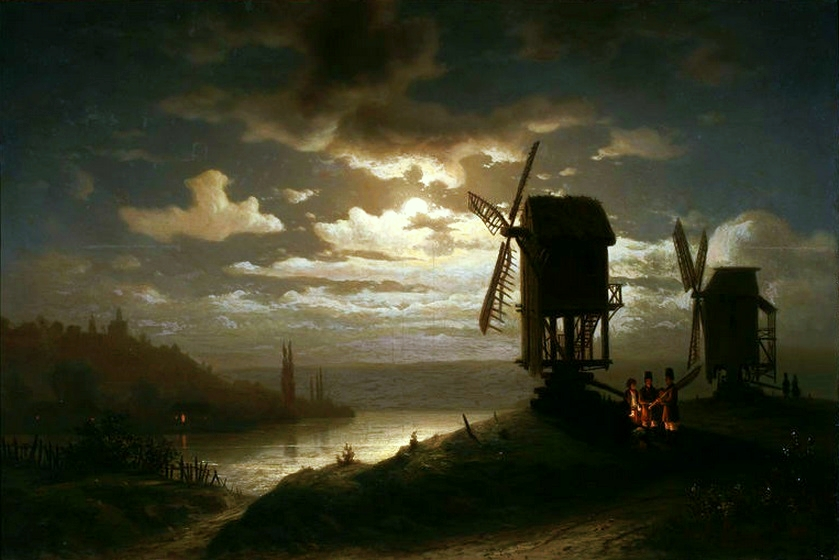
Nocturnal Landscape with Windmills (1864)

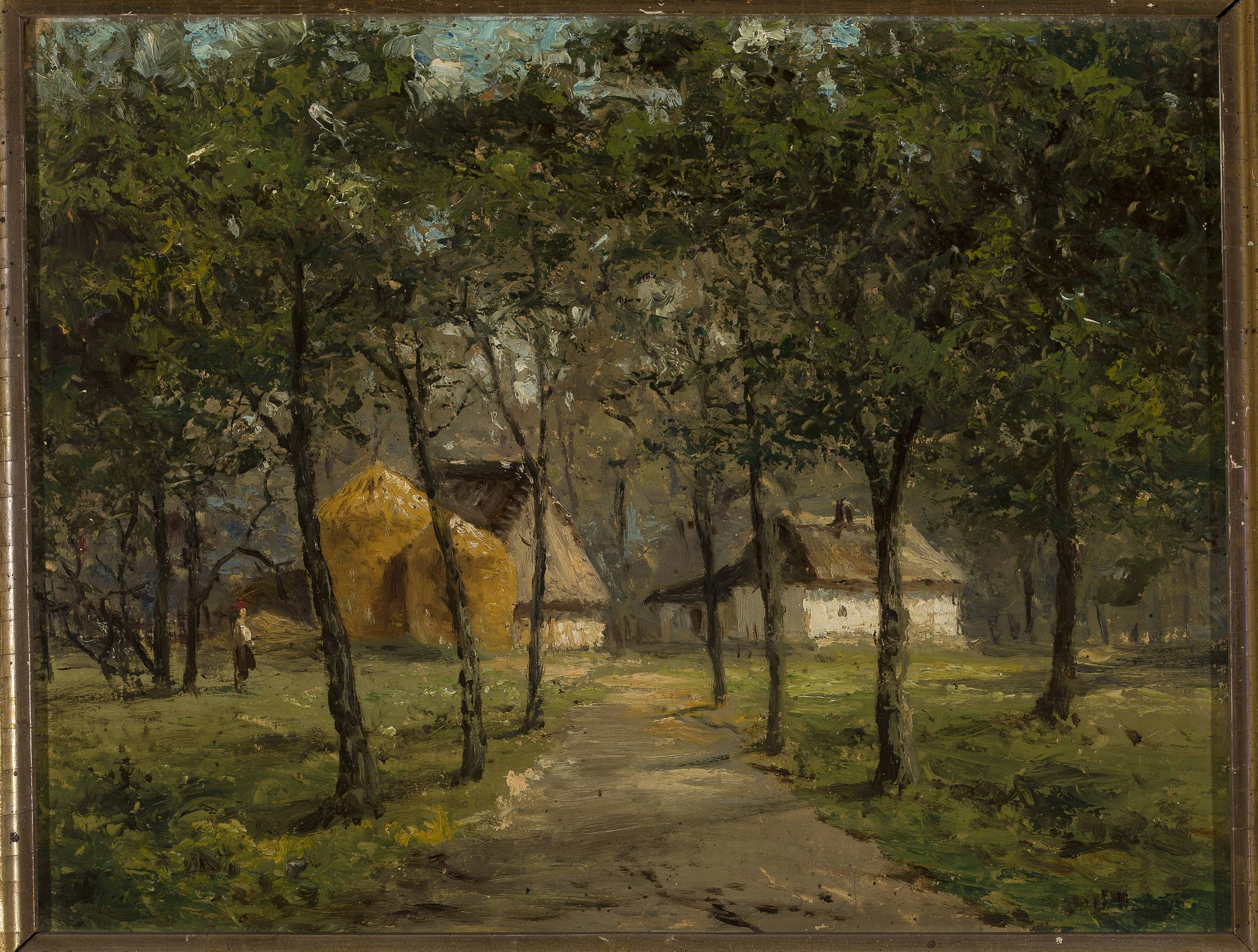
Landscape with Houses Among Trees

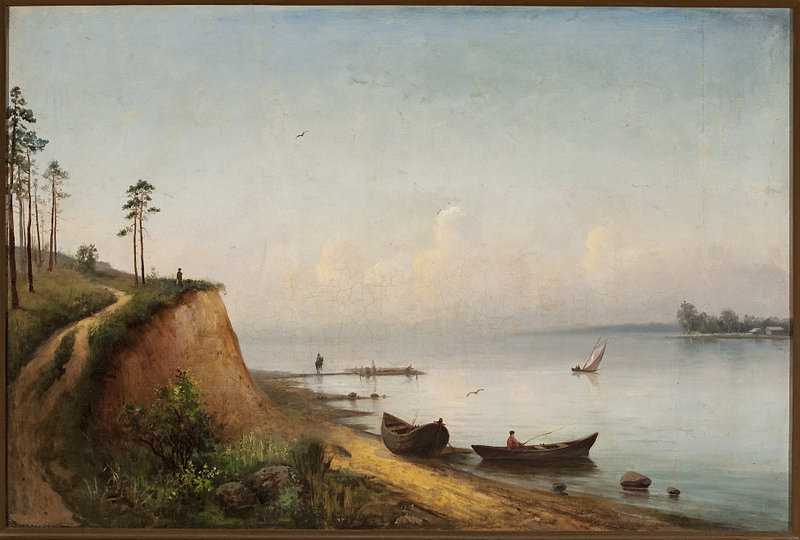
Steep Bank of the Viliya River

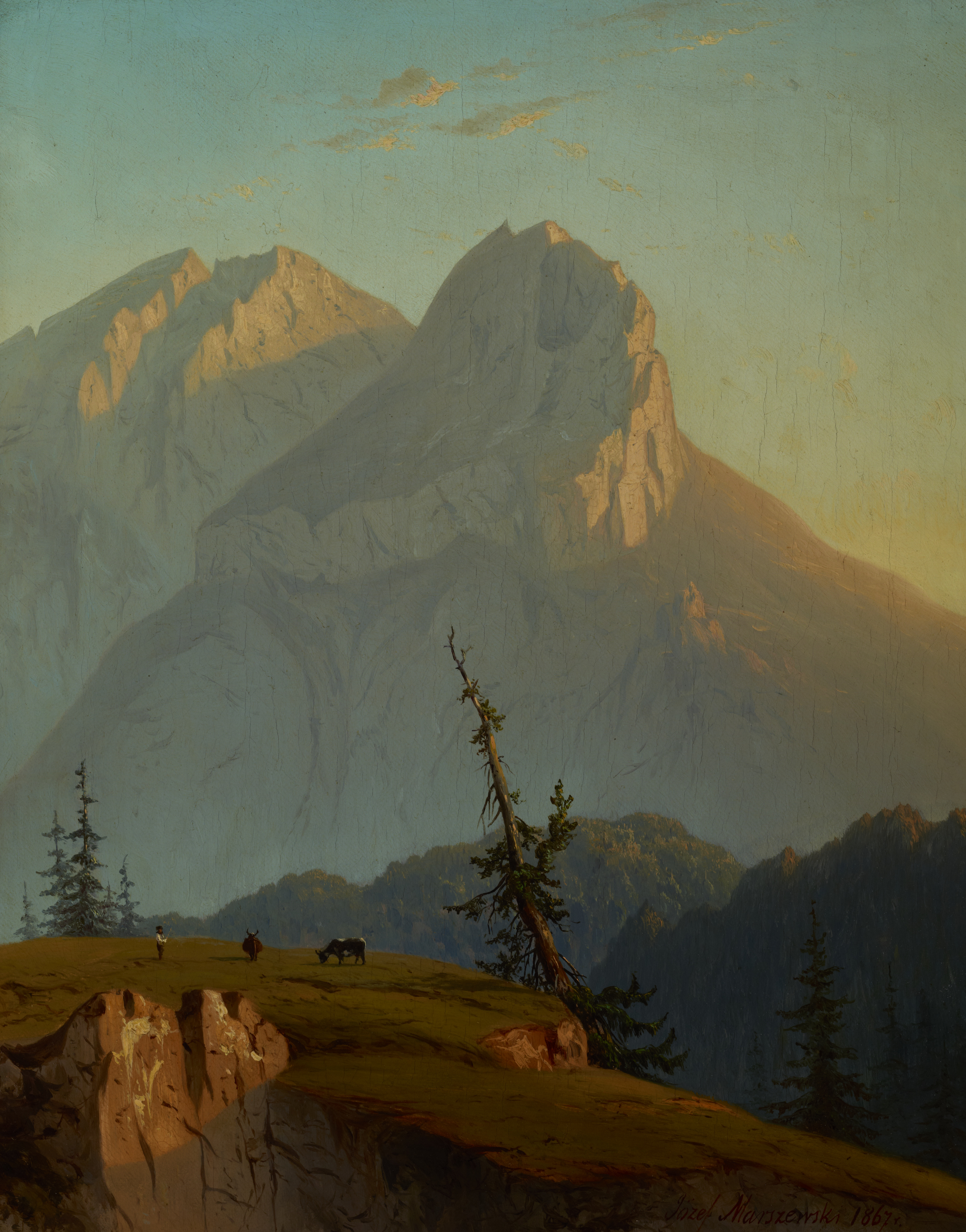
Mount Murań in the Tatra Mountains at Sunrise (1867)

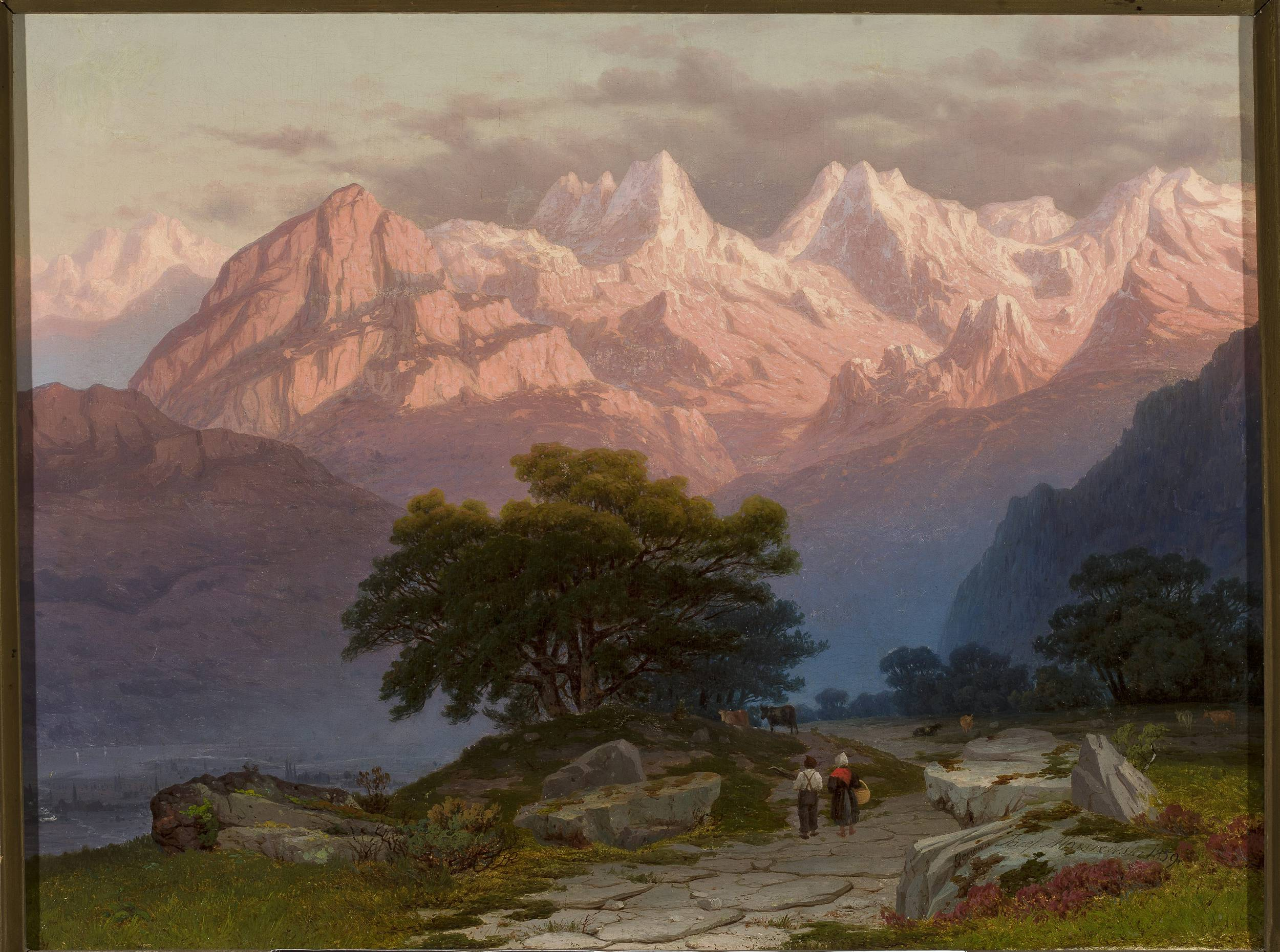
Mountain Landscape with Staffage (1859)

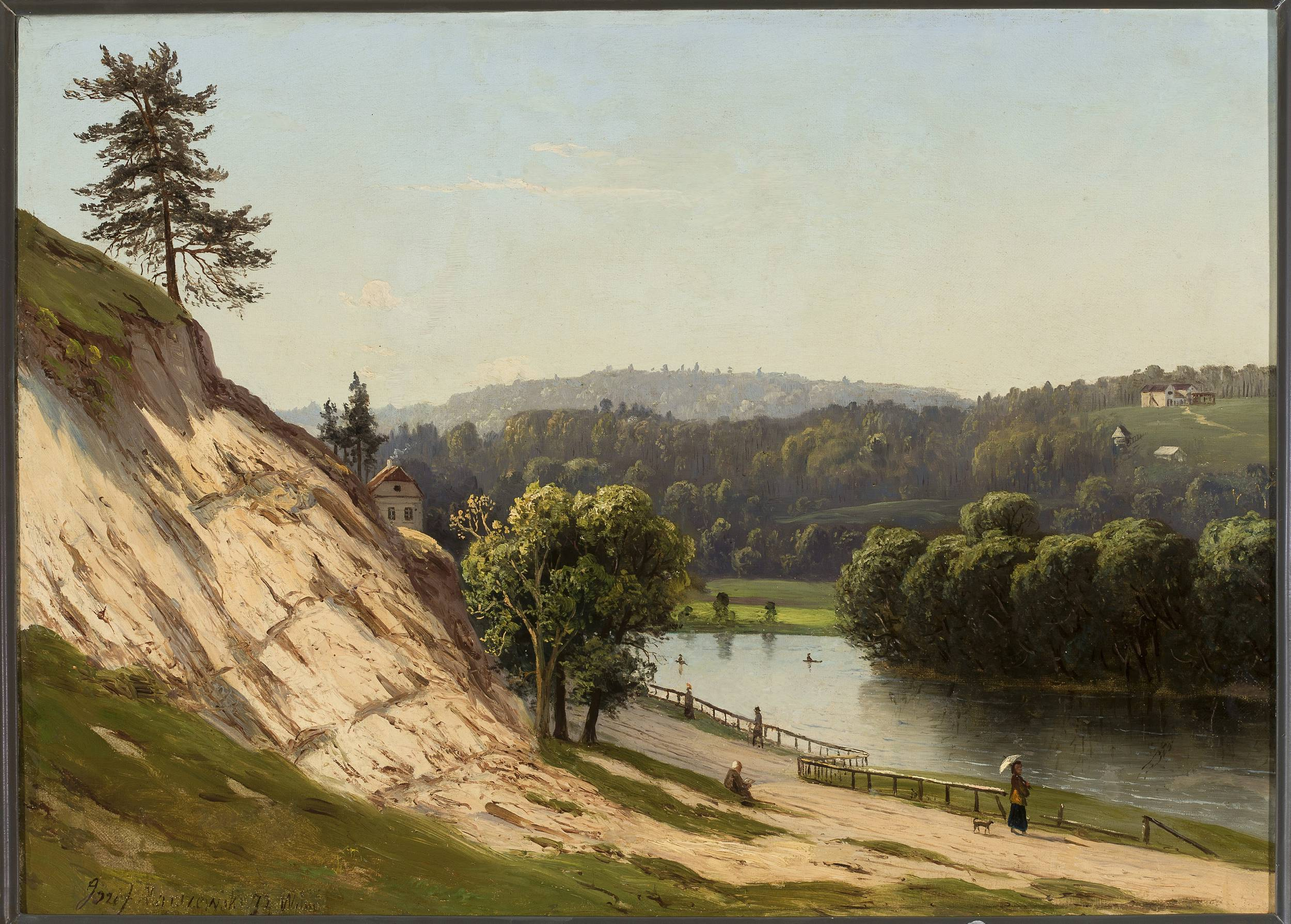
Near Vilnius (River Landscape) (1872)

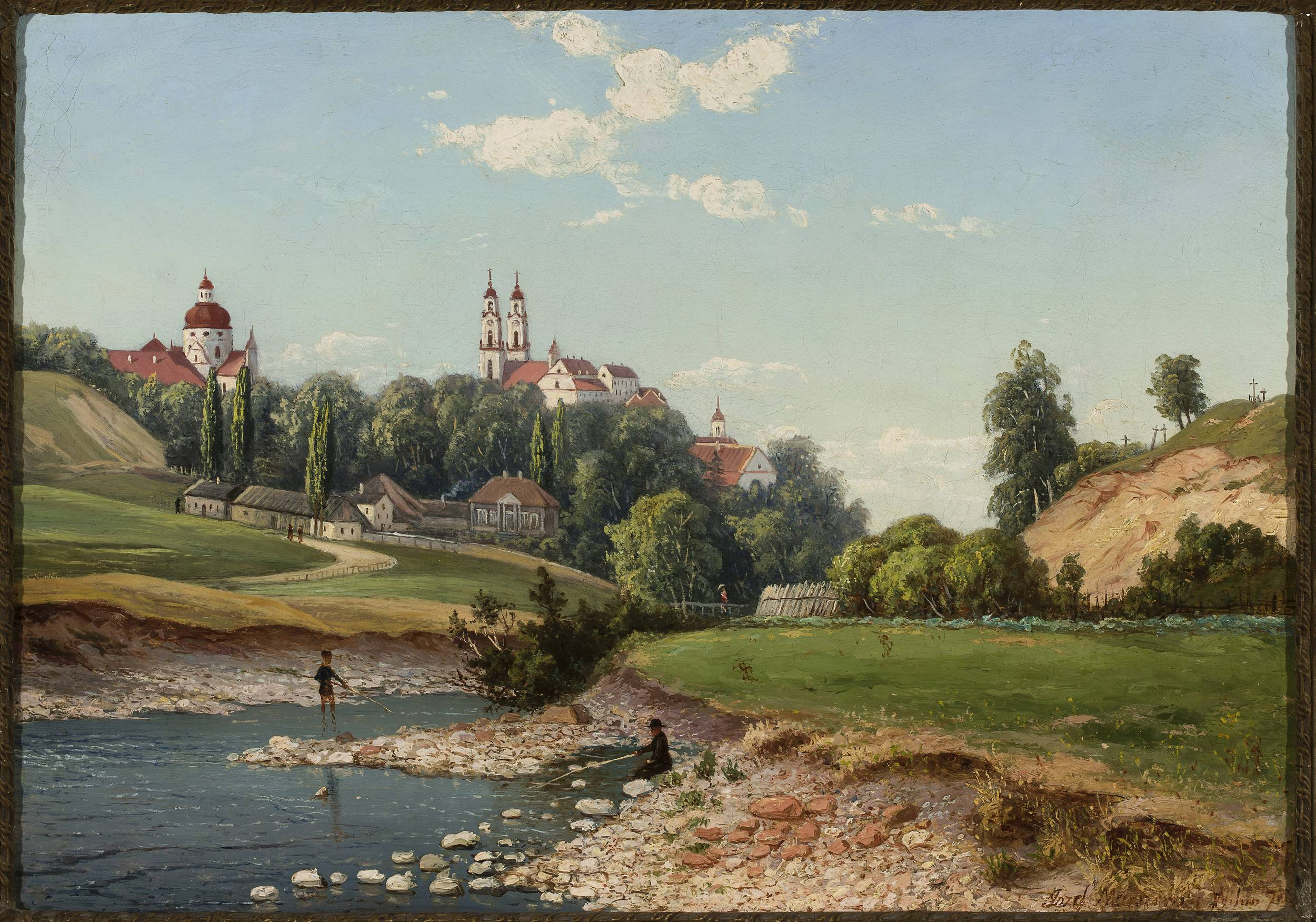
View of the church of Missionaries and Visitation Sisters in Vilnius (1870)

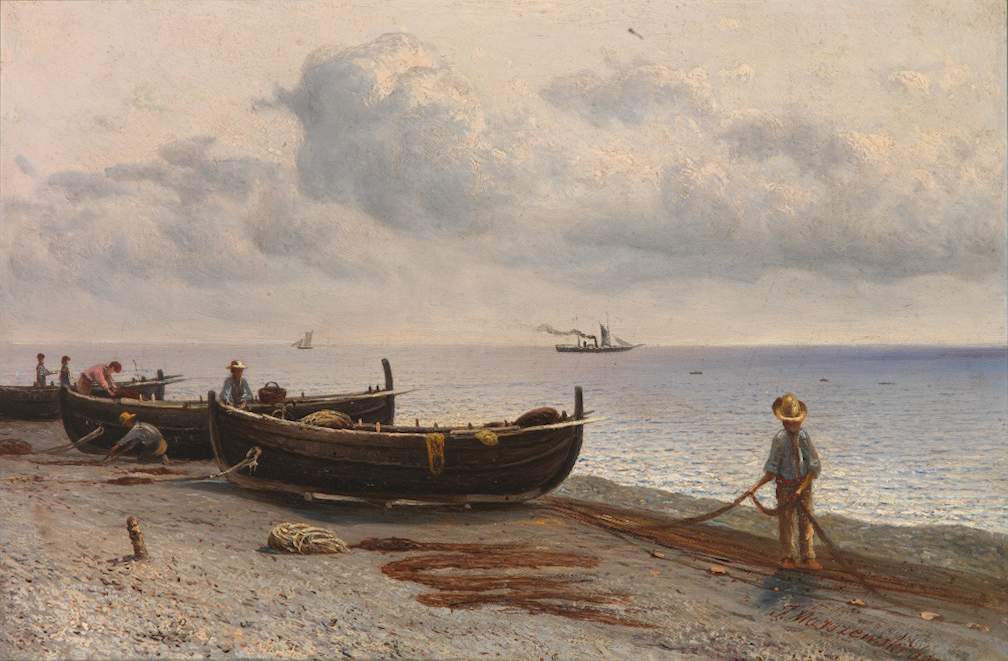
Fishermens' Boats Near the Mediterranean (1869)

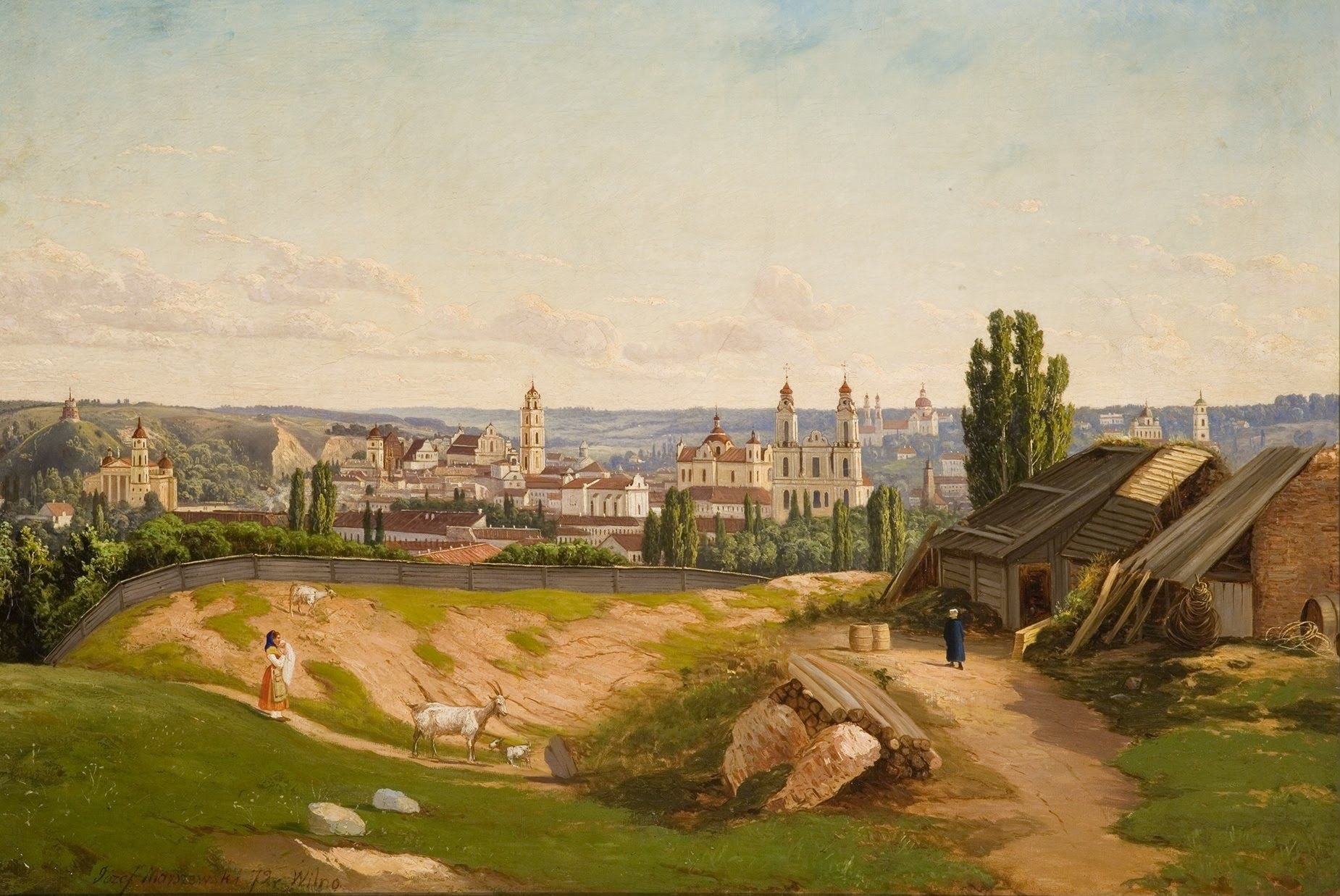
Vilnius viewed from Tauras Hill (1872)

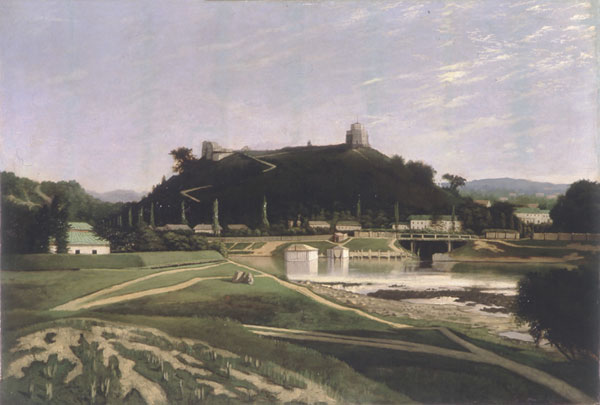
Gediminas Hill in Vilnius (1861)

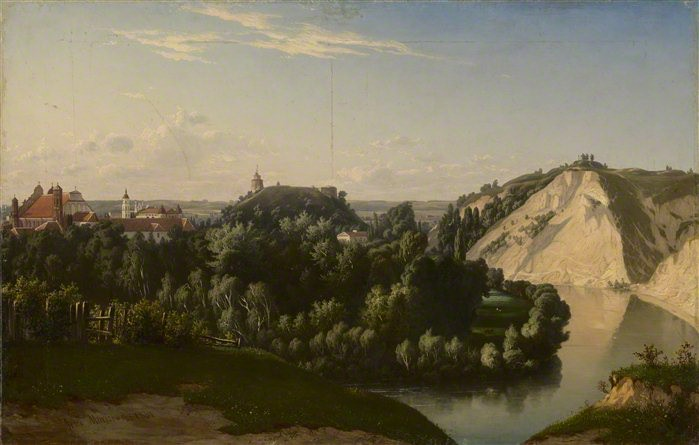
Vilnius, Bernardine Gardens (1868)

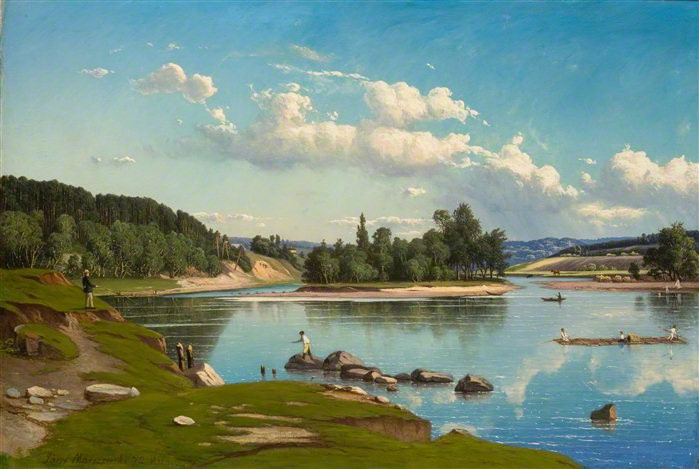
Vilnius, Vingis
