= Rudolf Weyr =

Austrian sculptor (1847–1914)

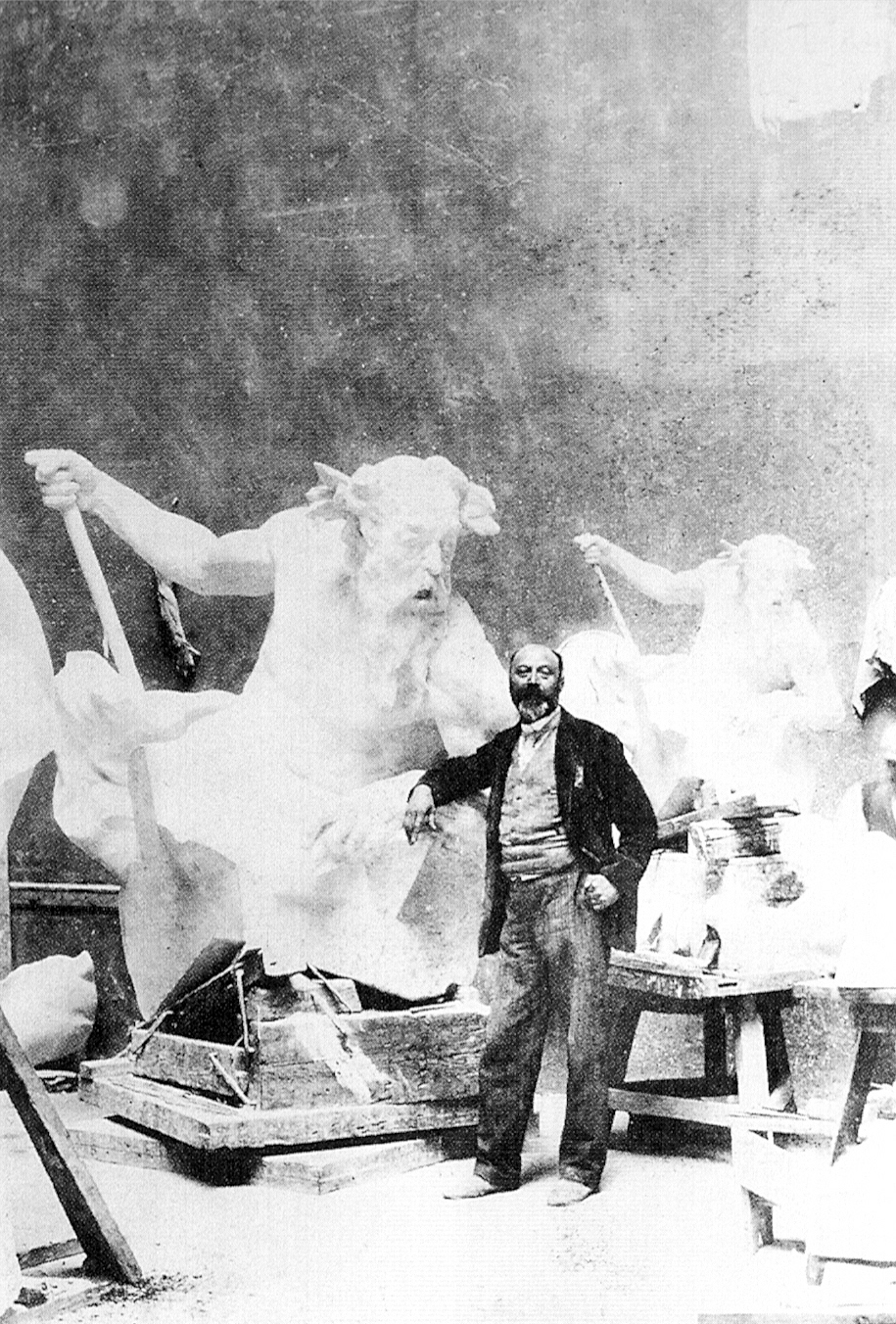
Rudolf Weyr in his workshop with pieces for his monumental fountain "Die Macht zur See" (Power at Sea, 1894)

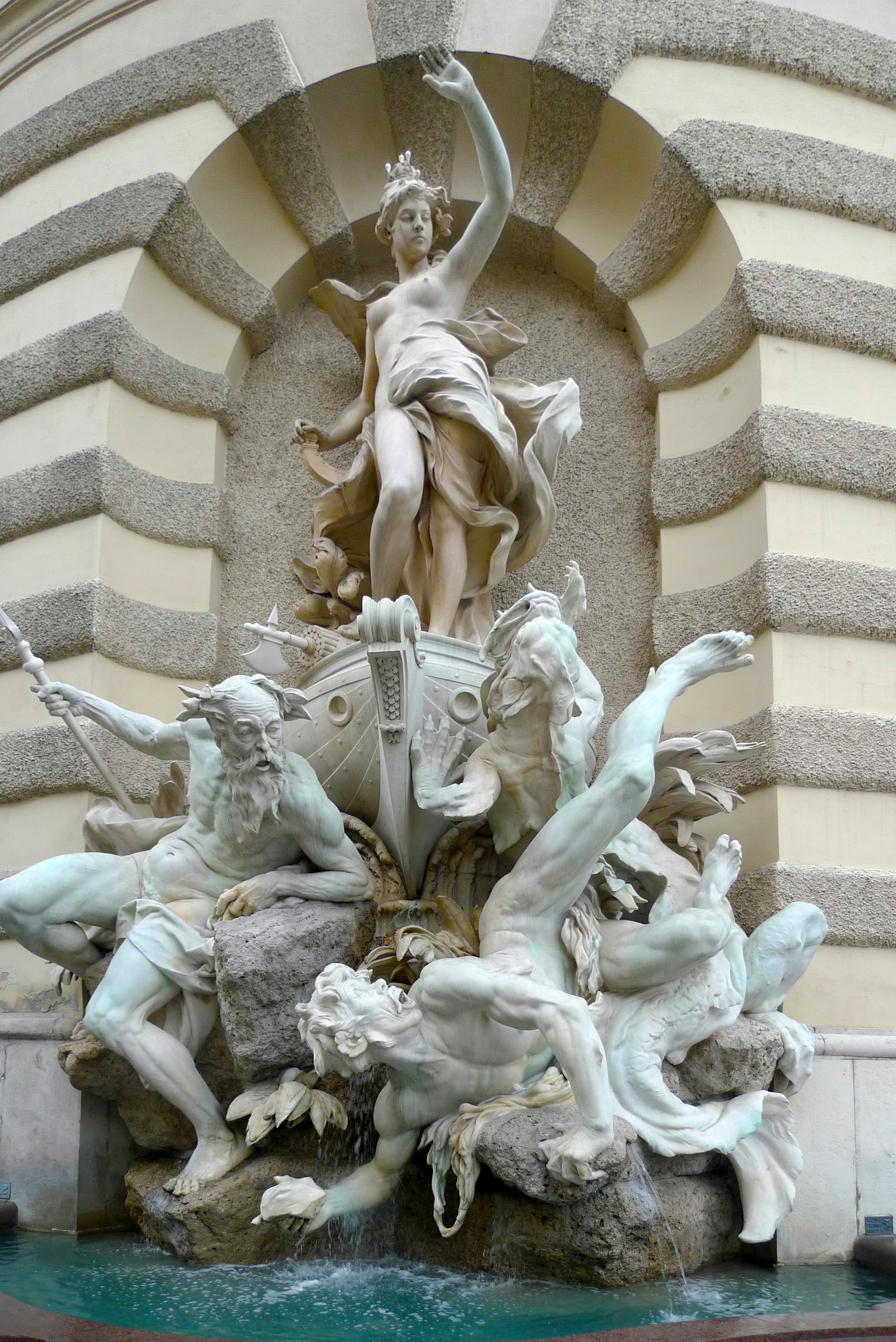
Power at Sea, as it appeared in 2009

Rudolf Weyr, from 14 May 1911, Rudolf Ritter von Weyr (22 March 1847, Vienna - 30 October 1914, Vienna) was an Austrian sculptor in the Neo-Baroque style.

== Life ==
He studied under Franz Bauer and Josef Cesar and was employed by the latter for many years. In 1875, he was contracted by Gottfried Semper and Carl Hasenauer to assist them with their work on the Kunsthistorisches Museum. In 1879, under the direction of Hans Makart, he designed table settings and other decorative pieces for the Emperor's Silver Wedding Anniversary. From the late 1880s, he worked alone and created some of the most important figures that adorn the Ringstraße.

In his later years, Weyr suffered from arteriosclerosis and died of heart failure induced by pneumonia. He was buried in the Döbling Cemetery.

In 1919, a street in Landstraße was named the Weyrgasse in his honor.

== Major works ==
- 1884: Gable statues at the Hermesvilla
- 1888: Spandrel figures in the windows at the Burgtheater
- 1889: Grillparzer Memorial in the Burggarten (with Carl Kundmann); Weyr created the reliefs depicting Grillparzer's dramatic works.
- 1890: Relief figures of the Museum's patrons in the dome of the Kunsthistorischen Museum
- 1895: Fountain: "Power at Sea" (its counterpart, "Power on the Land" is the work of the sculptor Edmund Hellmer) at the Michaelertrakt in the Hofburg
- 1895: Relief of Vasil Levski on his Memorial Sofia, Bulgaria
- 1898: Emperor Franz-Josef Memorial in Schwechat
- 1905: Memorial to Hans Canon in the Stadtpark
- 1907: Fountain in Děčín, Czech Republic
- 1908: Memorial to Johannes Brahms in the Karlsplatz
