= Wincenty Dmochowski =

Polish-Lithuanian painter

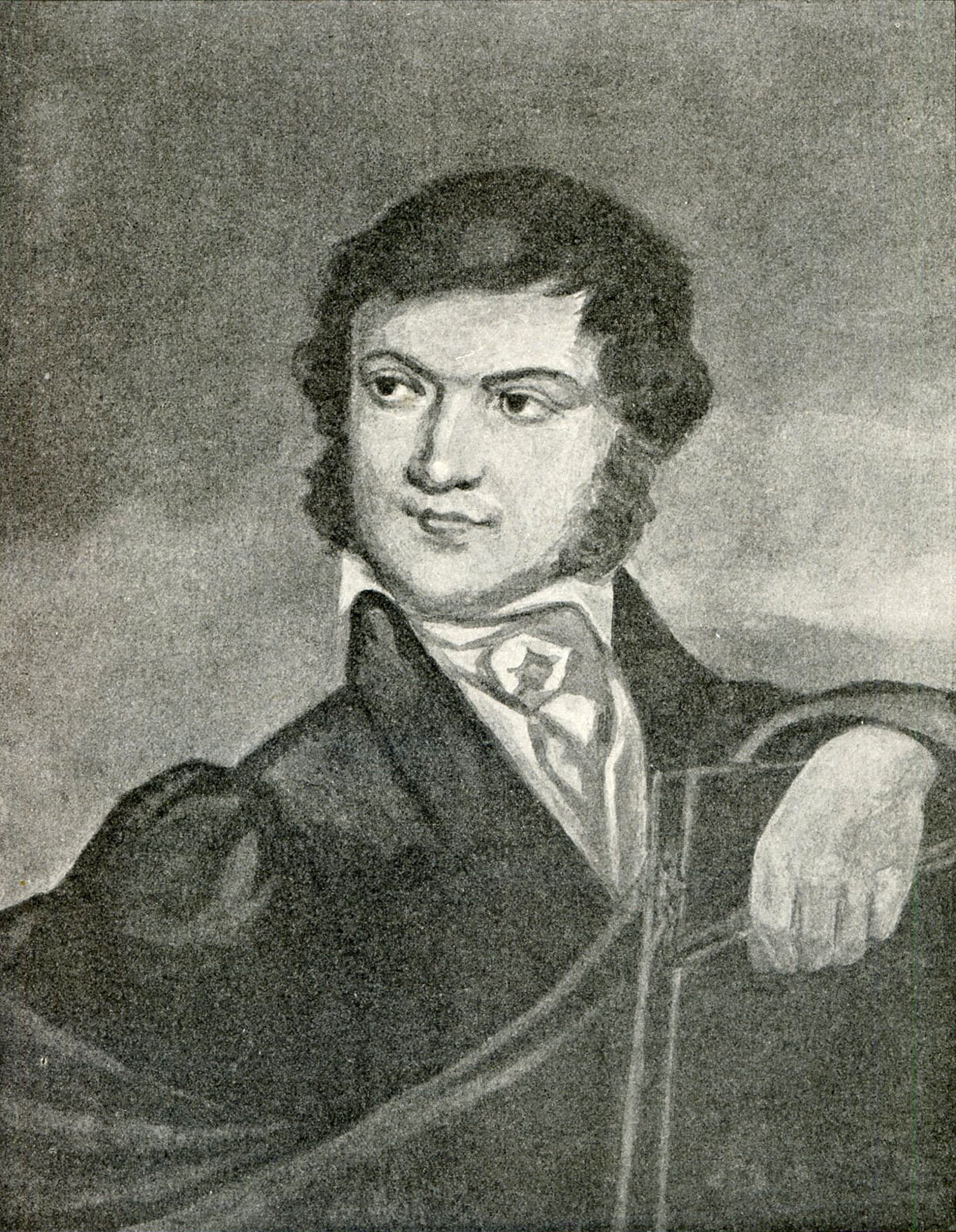
Wincenty Dmochowski by an unknown artist

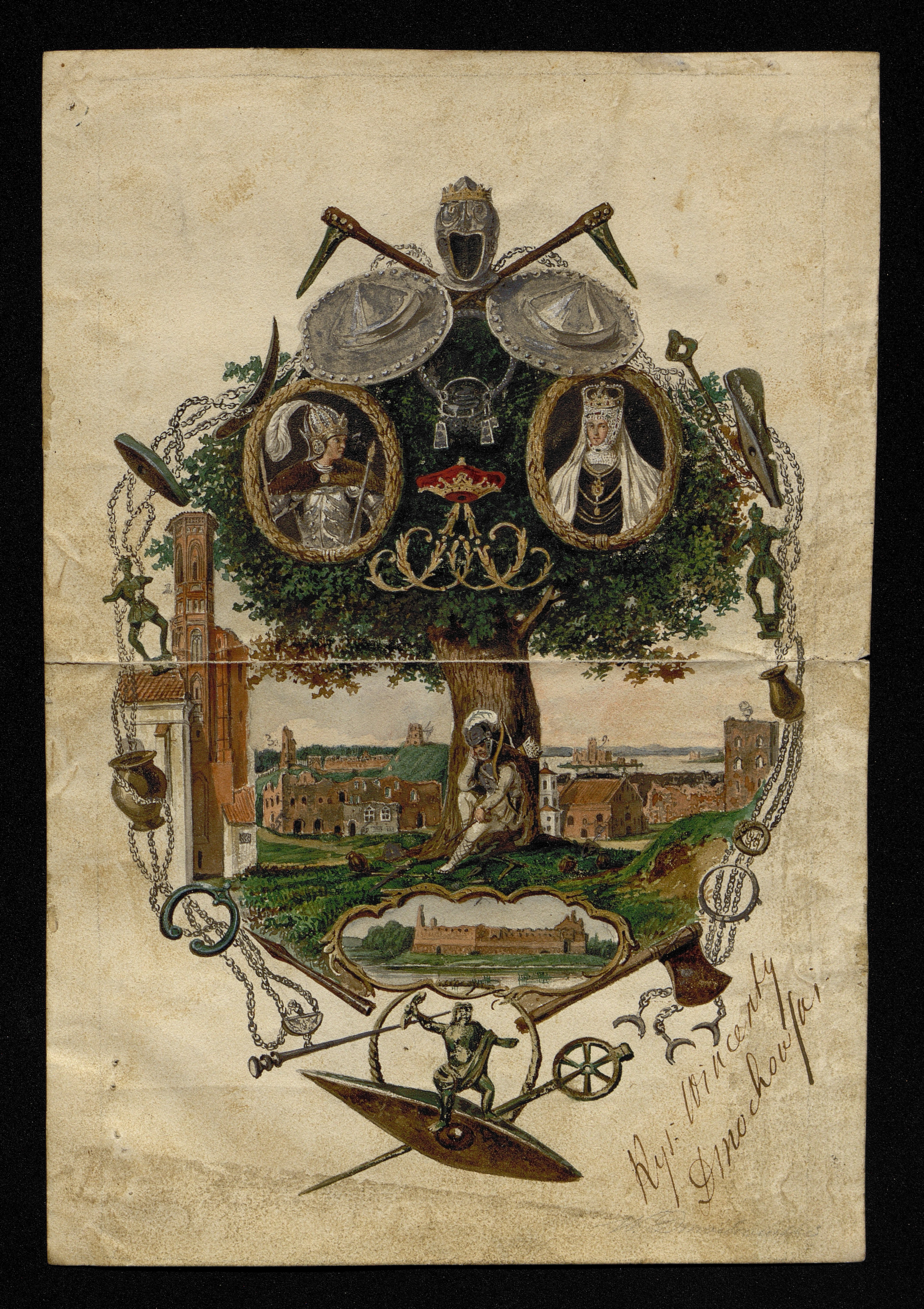
Allegory of Lithuania with Wincenty Dmochowski's signature

Wincenty Dmochowski or Dmóchowski (Lithuanian: Vincentas Dmachauskas, Belarusian: Vincent Dmachoŭski; born 1805/1807, Naharodavičy, Dzyatlava District, died 6 March 1862, Vilnius) was a painter who lived in the Russian Empire and scenographer in the Romantic style.

== Biography ==
He was born to a landowning family in the village Samiszcze. His father was Ignacy Dmochowski, vice-marshal of Ashmyany county, and his mother was Maria Zenowicz. After graduating from the public schools in Shchuchyn, he attended Vilnius University as a literature and fine arts student from 1826 to 1829. There he studied painting with Jan Rustem and sculpture with Kazimierz Jelski. In 1830 he married Salomea Orłowska, daughter of Ignacy Orłowski, officer of the Polish army.

After participating in the November Uprising, he was forced to abandon his studies and go into exile in Prussia to avoid persecution.

Following an amnesty, he was able to return to Vilnius in 1837 and opened his own private painting school in 1840. Józef Marszewski was one of his best-known students. His son, Władysław, also became a well-known painter.

Primarily known for landscapes, he also painted historical scenes, portraits and genre works focusing on rural interiors. He also created a series of canvases based on the poetry of Adam Mickiewicz, did restorations and executed some decorative work at a few sites, including Verkiai Palace and Vilnius Cathedral. On several occasions, he worked as a set designer, creating scenery for Halka by Stanisław Moniuszko and L'italiana in Algeri by Gioacchino Rossini, among others.

In 1847, he painted a series of Lithuanian castles on behalf of the archaeologist, Eustachy Tyszkiewicz, which are some of his most familiar works. Many of his paintings may be seen at the National Museum, Krakow.

== Selected works ==
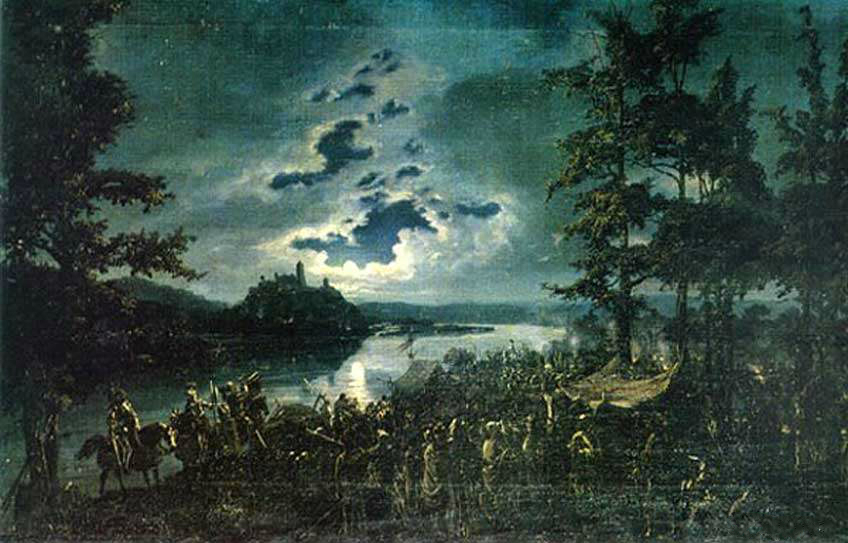
Crusaders Preparing to Attack
Punia Castle

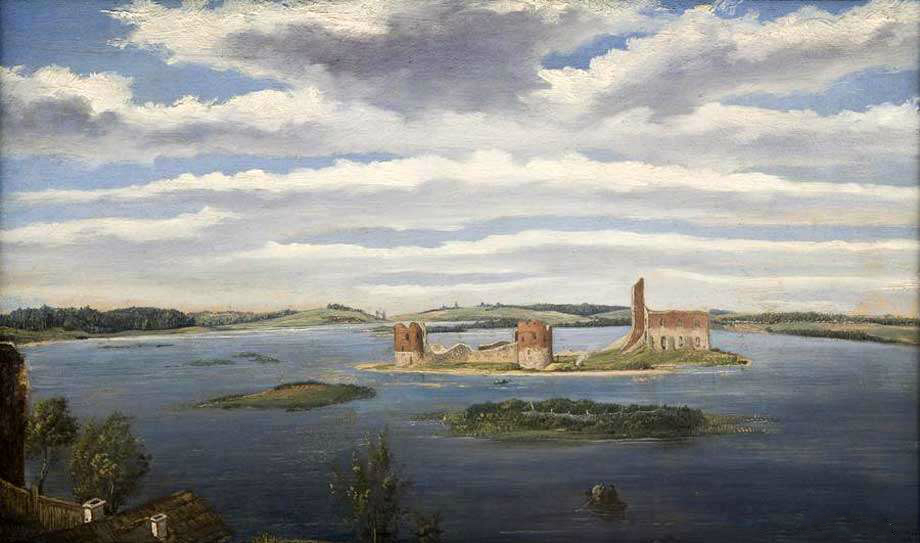
Trakai Island Castle

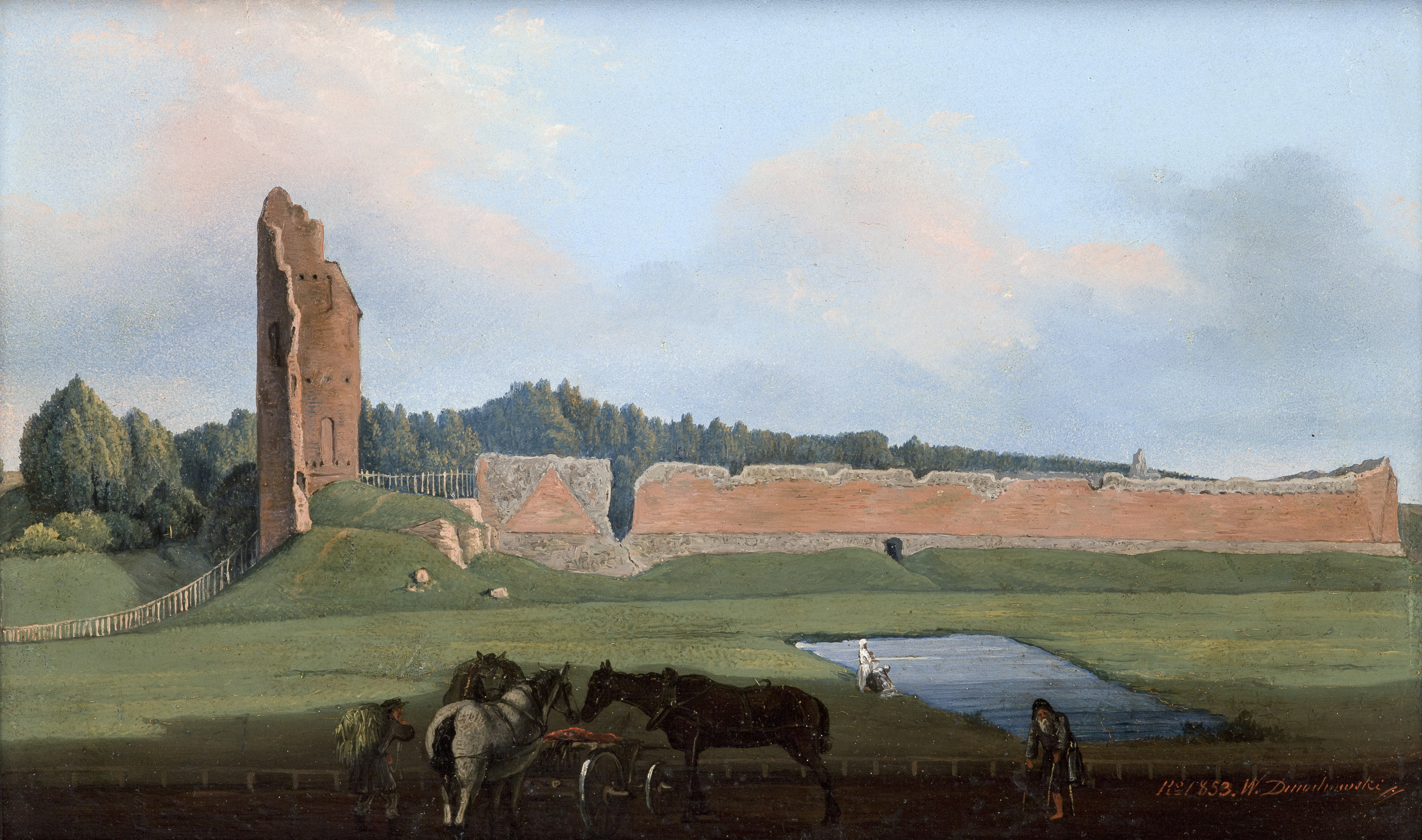
Medininkai Castle Ruins

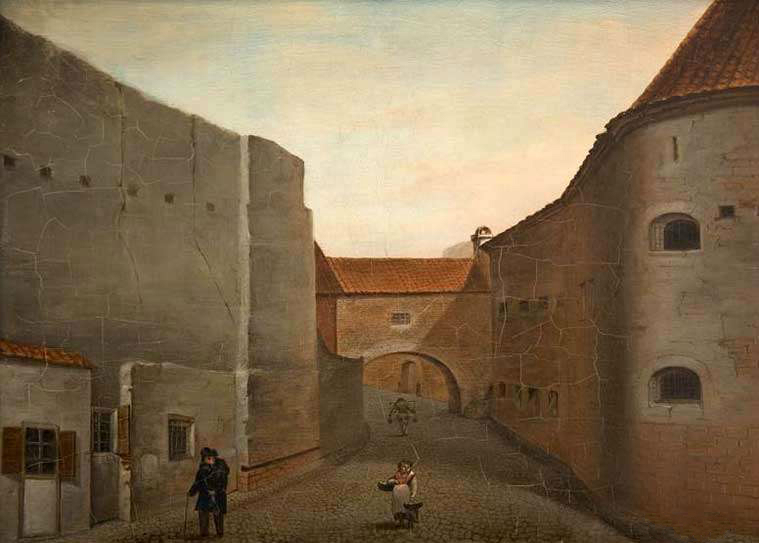
Street in Vilnius

== Sources ==
Syrokomla, Władysław (1862). "Wincenty Dmóchowski". Kurier Wileński (in Polish). No. 18. Vilnius.
