= Josef Cesar =

Austrian sculptor (1814–1876)

Josef Cesar (1814, Vienna - 29 June 1876, Vienna) was an Austrian sculptor and medallist.

== Biography ==
Sculptures at the Vienna Business School

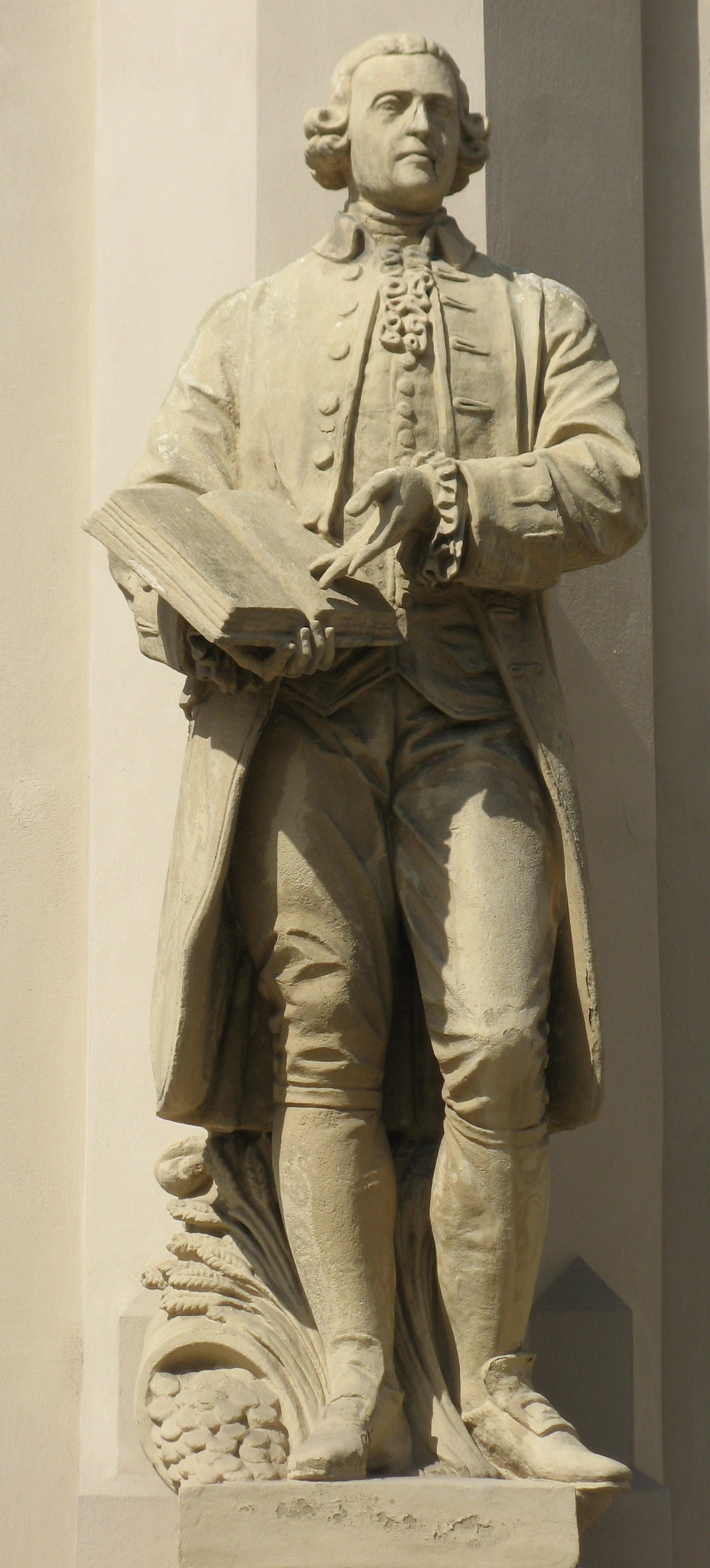
Adam Smith

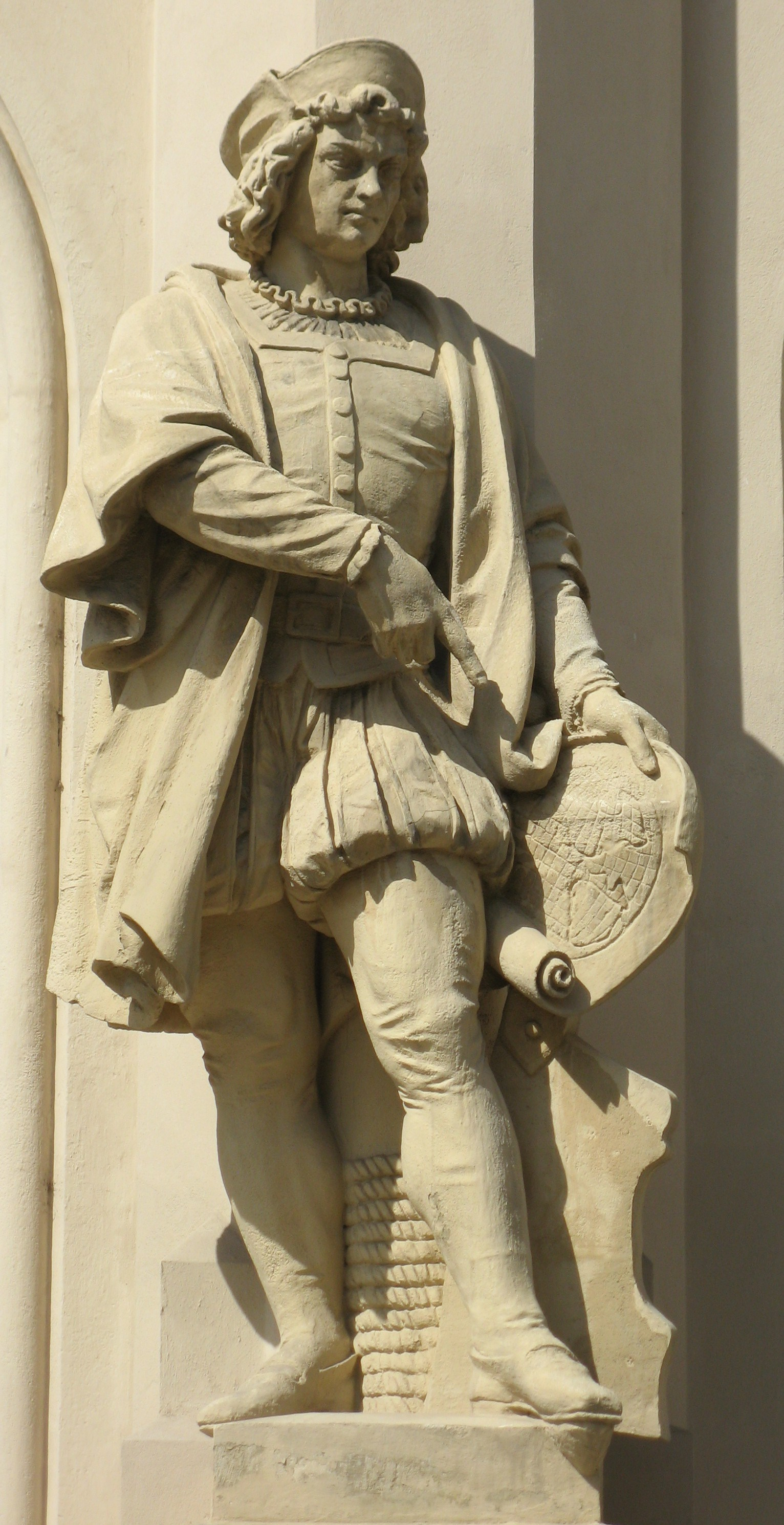
Christopher Columbus

His parents originally meant for him to become a clergyman but, in 1829, at the age of fifteen, he obtained an apprenticeship with the engraving and artistic ironworking company, Wielthalm. Three years later, he began studying sculpture with Luwig Schaller and Joseph Käßmann (1784–1856) at the Academy of Fine Arts, Vienna. Then, under the tutelage of Luigi Pichler, studied the making of coinage and hardstone carving. In 1836, he was awarded the Kaiserpreis, which included a grant to study in Rome. He was there until 1842.

In 1845, he was able to visit the mints of Germany, France and England, at state expense. Three years later, he was named a member of the academy in Vienna. Not long after, he started becoming discouraged by the amount of bureaucracy involved in the making of coins and medals, so he switched to producing large sculptures. From 1856, he taught modeling at two secondary schools. One of his best known students was the sculptor - Rudolf Weyr.

Some of his most notable works include a bronze statue of St. Helena, for display in Jerusalem (1854), sandstone statues of Christopher Columbus and Adam Smith for the façade of the Vienna Business School (1862), and a marble statue of Johann Bernhard Fischer von Erlach on the Elisabethbrücke (1867). He also created fifteen portrait medallions of famous actors, in cement, for the box parapets at the Vienna State Opera.
