= Trakai Island Castle =

Island castle in Trakai, Lithuania

- Trakų salos pilis (Lithuanian)
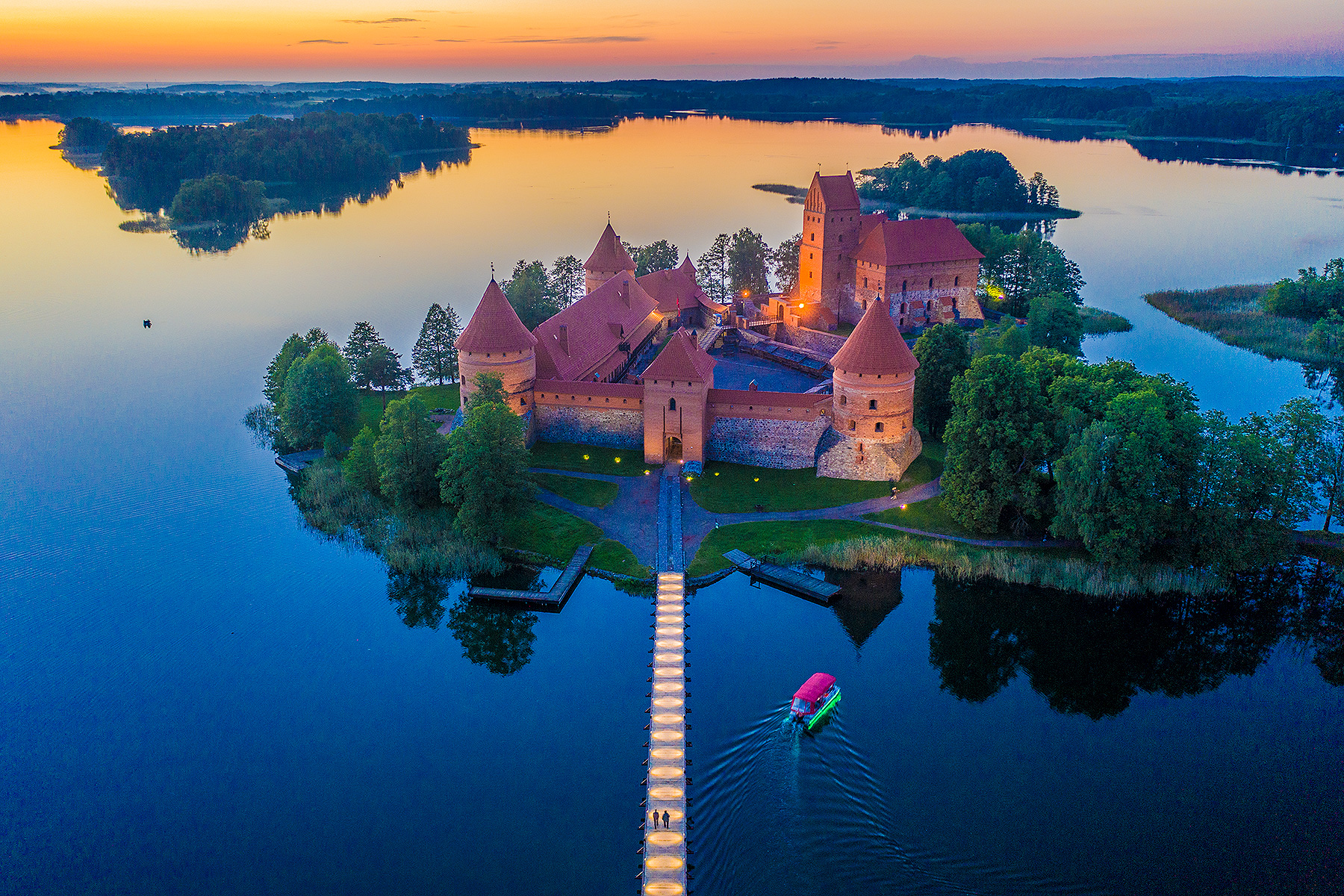
- View from Lake Galvė shore

- Location within Lithuania
- Interactive map of Trakai Island Castle
- 54°39′09″N 24°55′59″E
- Type: Castle
- Location: Trakai, Lithuania

History
- Built: 14th century
- Built for: Grand Duke Kęstutis

Site notes
- Architectural style: Brick Gothic
- Restored: 1946-1961
- Owner: Trakai History Museum
- Visitors: 300 000 (in 2008)
- Website: trakaimuziejus.lt

Cultural Monuments of Lithuania
- Type: National
- Designated: 13 February 2008
- Reference no.: 1020

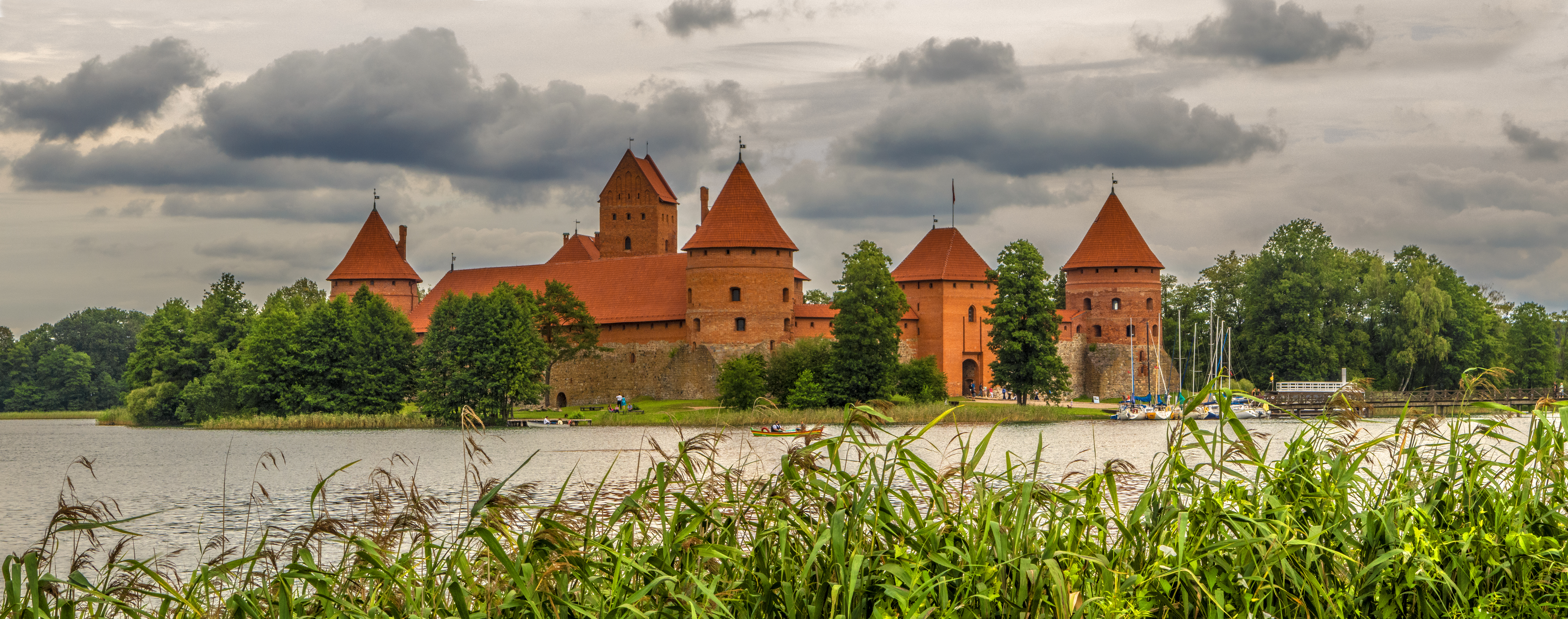
View from Lake Galvė shore

Trakai Island Castle (Lithuanian: Trakų salos pilis, Polish: Zamek w Trokach) is an island castle located in Trakai, Lithuania, on an island in Lake Galvė. The construction of the stone castle was begun in the 14th century by Kęstutis, and around 1409 major works were completed by his son Vytautas the Great, who died in this castle in 1430. Trakai was one of the main centers of the Grand Duchy of Lithuania and the castle held great strategic importance. The castle was rebuilt in the 1950s–1960s by Lithuanian initiative, although it had received resistance from Soviet authorities. The Trakai History Museum was established after the reconstruction.

== Construction ==
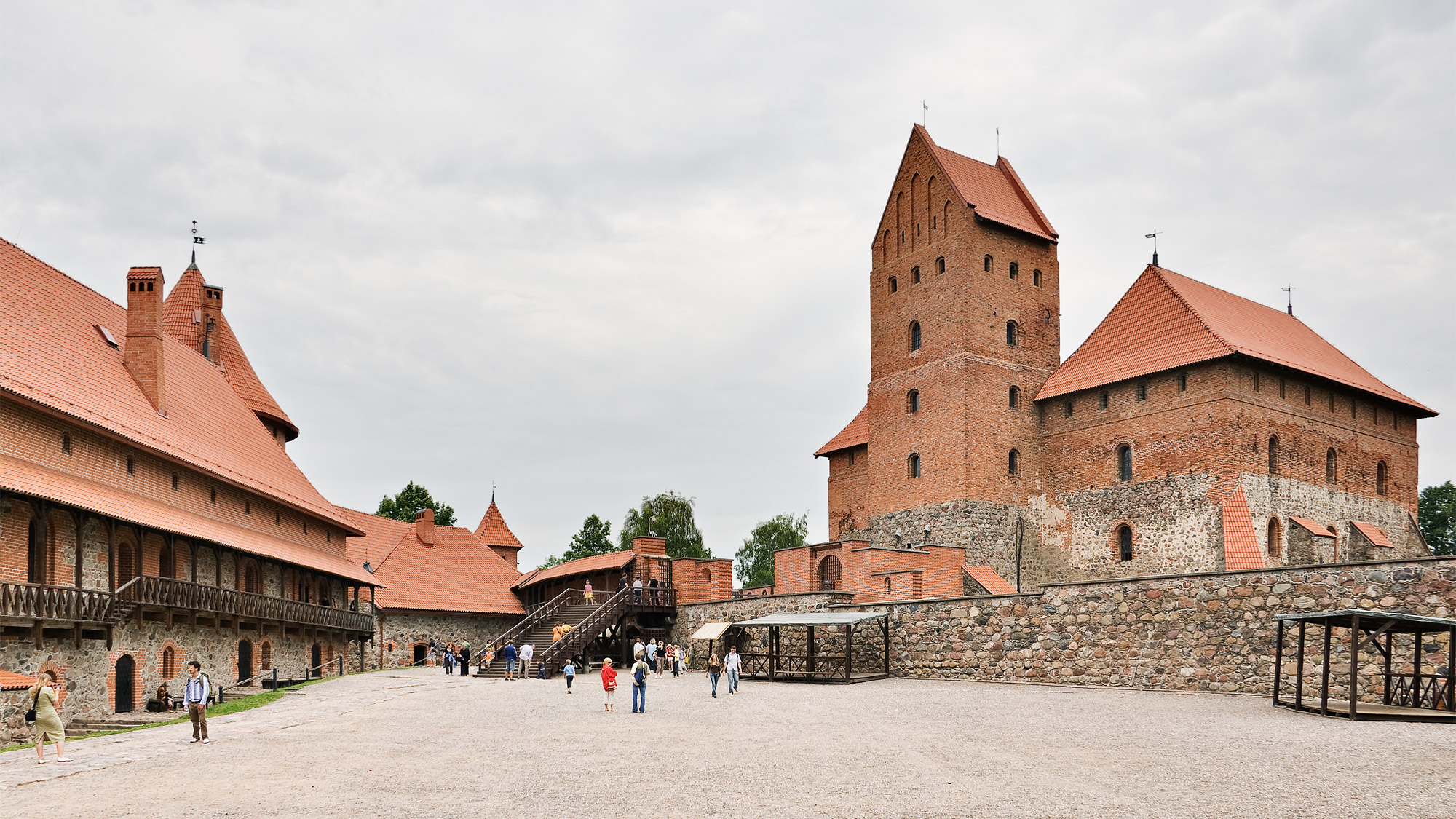
Inner yard of castle. On the right – the Ducal Palace and its keep

=== First phase ===
Trakai Island Castle was built in several phases. During the first phase, in the second half of the 14th century, the castle was constructed on the largest of three lake islands by the order of Grand Duke Kęstutis. The construction of Trakai Island Castle was related to the expansion and strengthening of the Trakai Peninsula Castle. Kęstutis moved his main residence and his treasury to the Island Castle.

The castle suffered major devastation during an attack by the Teutonic knights in 1377. After the assassination of Kęstutis, a power struggle between Jogaila and Vytautas the Great for the title of Grand Duke of Lithuania began. The castle was besieged by both sides. Soon after the reconciliation between Jogaila and Vytautas, the second phase of construction started and continued until 1409. This phase is regarded as the major development in the history of the castle. Apparently, during the truce with the Teutonic Order, the construction works were supervised by the Order's stonemason Radike, four years before the Battle of Grunwald.

=== Second phase ===
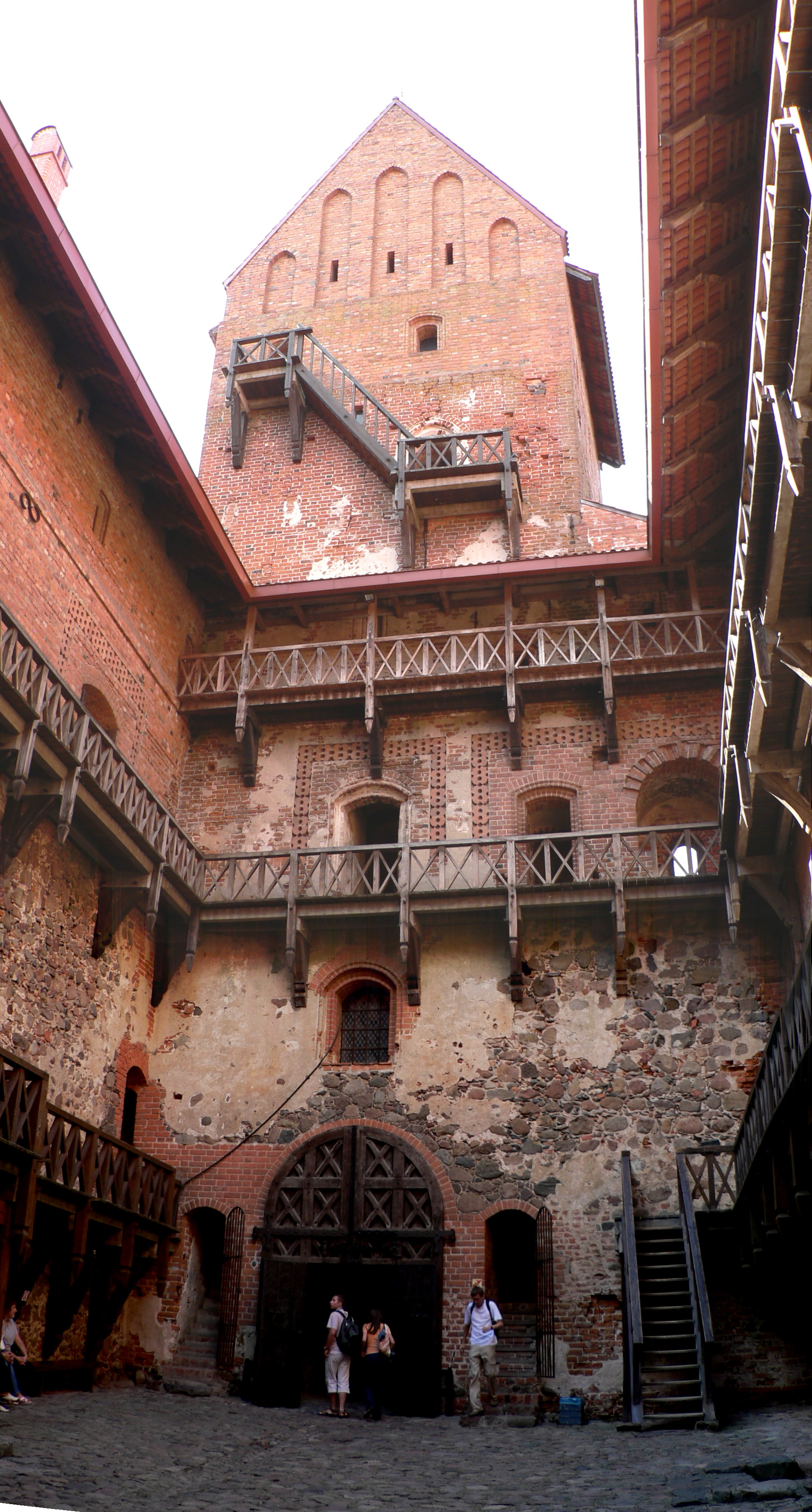
The inner yard of the palace and its wooden stair galleries

During the second phase, two wings were added, and on the southern side a six-storey (35 metres or 115 feet) keep was built. The keep had movable gates which separated the palace from the castle. The keep was used for several functions; besides serving as another defensive structure, it had a chapel and living quarters. It was linked to the multi-storey Ducal Palace, which had an inner yard. The inner yard had wooden galleries, which ran around the inner wall; these galleries were used to access various support facilities without going inside the palace itself.

The entire southern wing of the southern palace was used for the Ducal Hall. This hall was around 10 by 21 metres (33 ft × 69 ft) in size, and only the Upper Palace in the Vilnius Castle Complex could surpass its proportions.

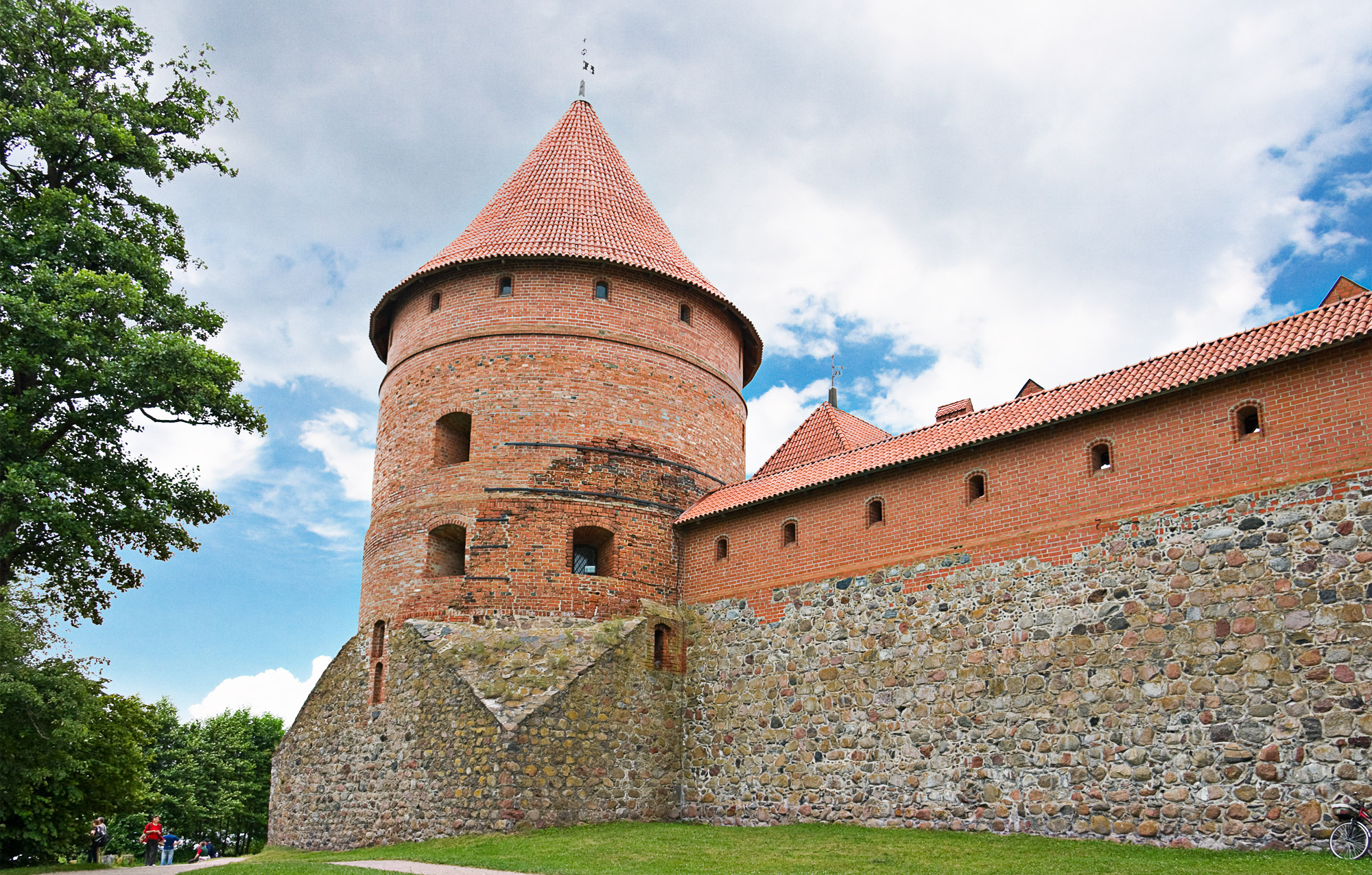
Castle walls and corner tower

The principal construction material was so-called red Gothic bricks. Stone blocks were used only in the foundations and the upper parts of buildings, towers and walls. The castle was decorated in a variety of ways, including glazed roof tiling, burned bricks, and stained glass windows. Its overall style after the second construction phase could be described as Gothic with some Romanesque features.

=== Third phase ===
The expansion of the castle in the early 15th century marked the third phase of Trakai's development. The walls of the castle were strengthened to a thickness of 2.5 metres (8.2 ft) and raised with additional firing galleries. Three major defensive towers were constructed on the corners. The south-western tower was also used as a prison. The top story of the towers was designed for soldiers and housed a large number of cannons. A main gatehouse was also constructed which, along with the Ducal Palace keep, had movable gates. The gatehouse was reinforced with additional sections for firing galleries. Near the inner walls several buildings were constructed, including stables, kitchens, and other support structures. When the castle was undergoing this expansion in the 15th century, the water level of Lake Galvė was several metres higher than it is today. The castle builders took advantage of this by separating the Ducal Palace and the castle with a moat, just wide enough for small boats to sail through. They were connected by gates that could be raised in case of an enemy attack.

== Ruin ==
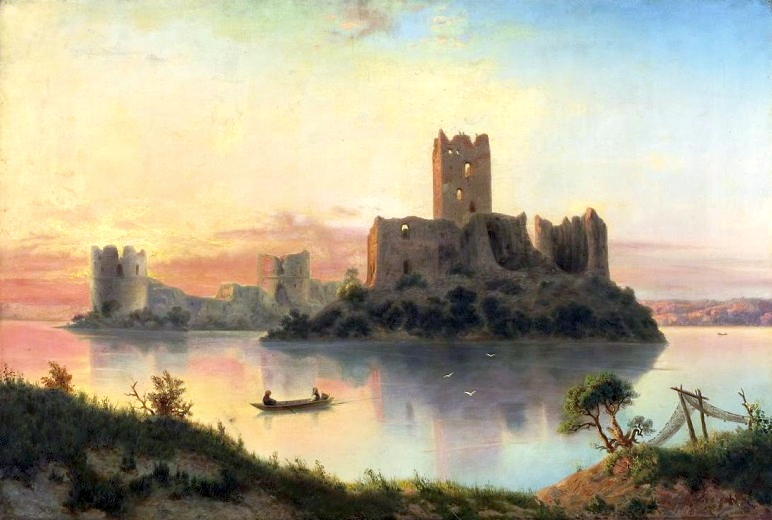
Trakai Island Castle in Ruins by Józef Marszewski (1866), National Museum in Warsaw

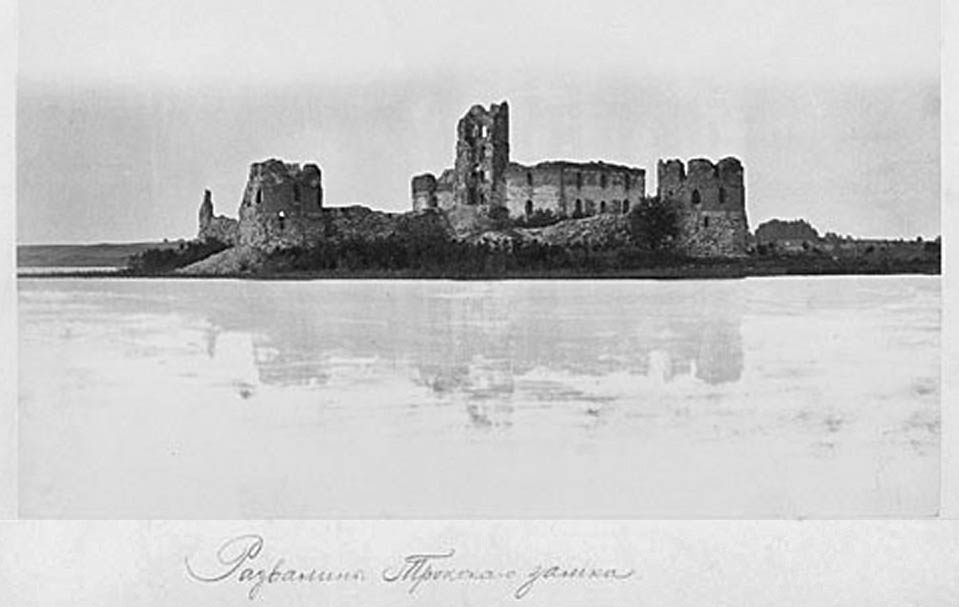
Photo from about 1870–1880

Trakai Island Castle lost its military importance soon after the Battle of Grunwald, when the chief enemy of the Grand Duchy of Lithuania was defeated by the Polish-Lithuanian army. The castle was transformed into a residence and newly decorated from the inside. New frescos were painted on its walls, which have been partially preserved. Foreign emissaries were welcomed in the Ducal Palace. It is known that Jogaila visited the castle thirteen times between 1413 and 1430. In 1414, the Flemish traveler Guillebert de Lannoy described the castle in these words:

The old castle stands on one side of the lake, in open ground, the other one stands in the middle of a second lake, and is within a cannon shot of the old one. It is completely new, built from bricks following French pattern.

Grand Duke Vytautas the Great died in the castle without being crowned as King of Lithuania in 1430. During the rule of Sigismund Augustus, the castle was redecorated in a Renaissance style, and it served as the royal summer residence for a short period of time. Lithuanian Metrica was kept in the castle until 1511. Later, the castle served as a prison. During the wars with Muscovy in the 17th century, the castle was damaged and was not reconstructed again. It gradually fell into disrepair.

== Reconstruction ==
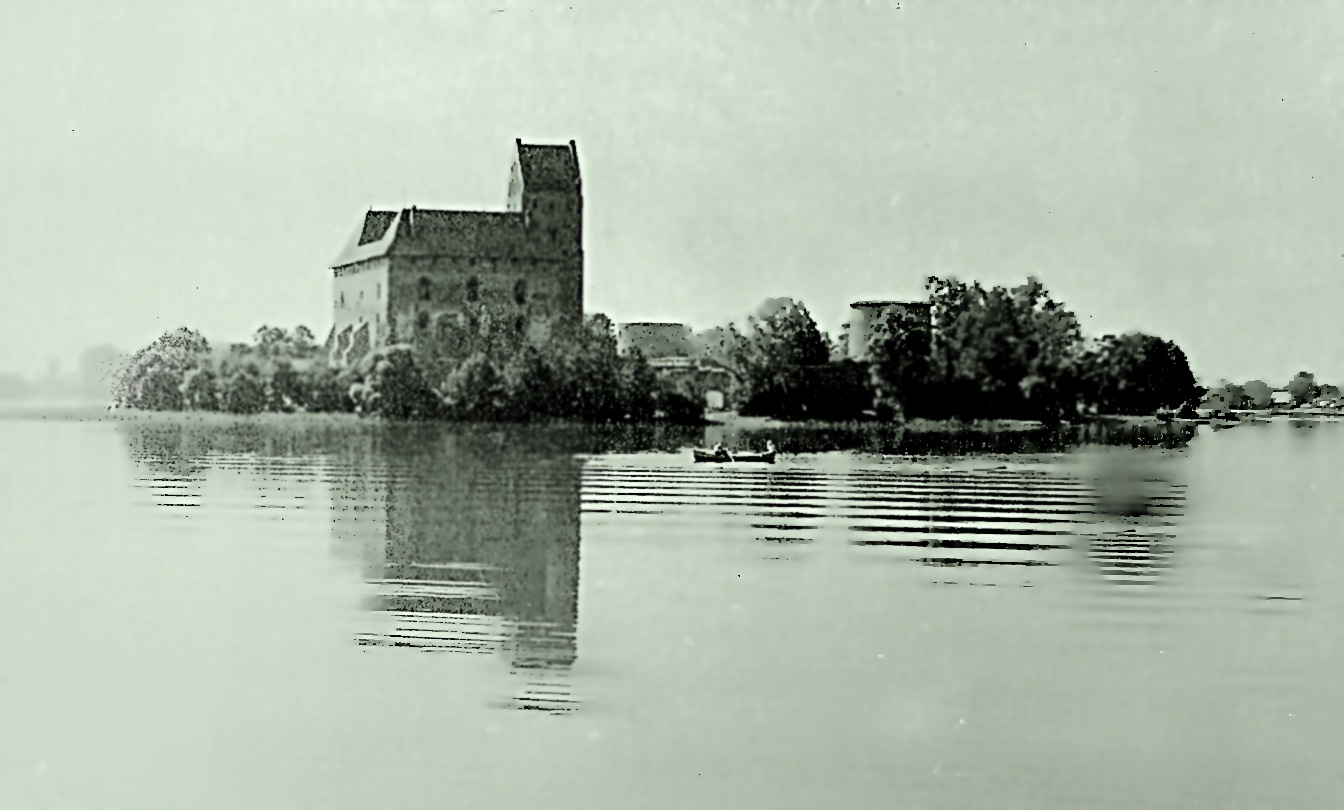
Photo from January 1971

During the 19th century, castle reconstruction plans were prepared. Its original frescos were preserved and copied by Wincenty Smokowski. The Imperial Archaeological Commission initiated the documentation of the remaining castle in 1888. In 1905, the Imperial Russian authorities decided to partially restore the castle ruins. During World War I, German specialists made several attempts to restore the castle. Between 1935 and 1941, parts of the Ducal Palace walls were strengthened, and the south-eastern castle tower was rebuilt, including sections of its walls. Lithuanian and Polish preservationists worked on the project, but the work stopped when the war gained in intensity. A major reconstruction project was begun in 1946; active work started in 1951–1952. The major portion of the reconstruction was finished in 1961. The castle was reconstructed in a 15th-century style.

Trakai Island Castle is now a major tourist attraction.

== Gallery ==
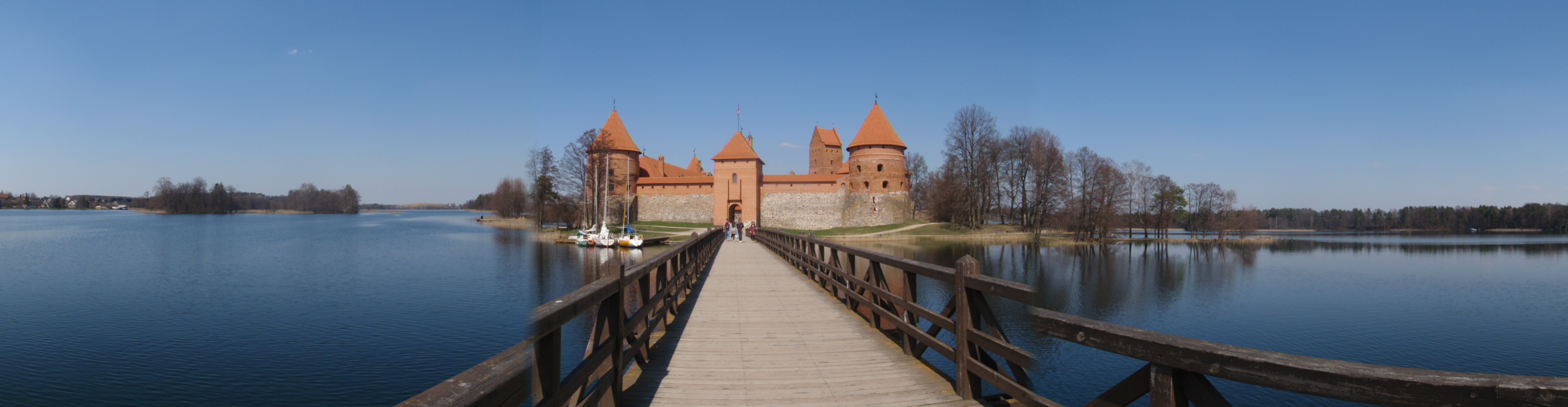
Panoramic view of Trakai
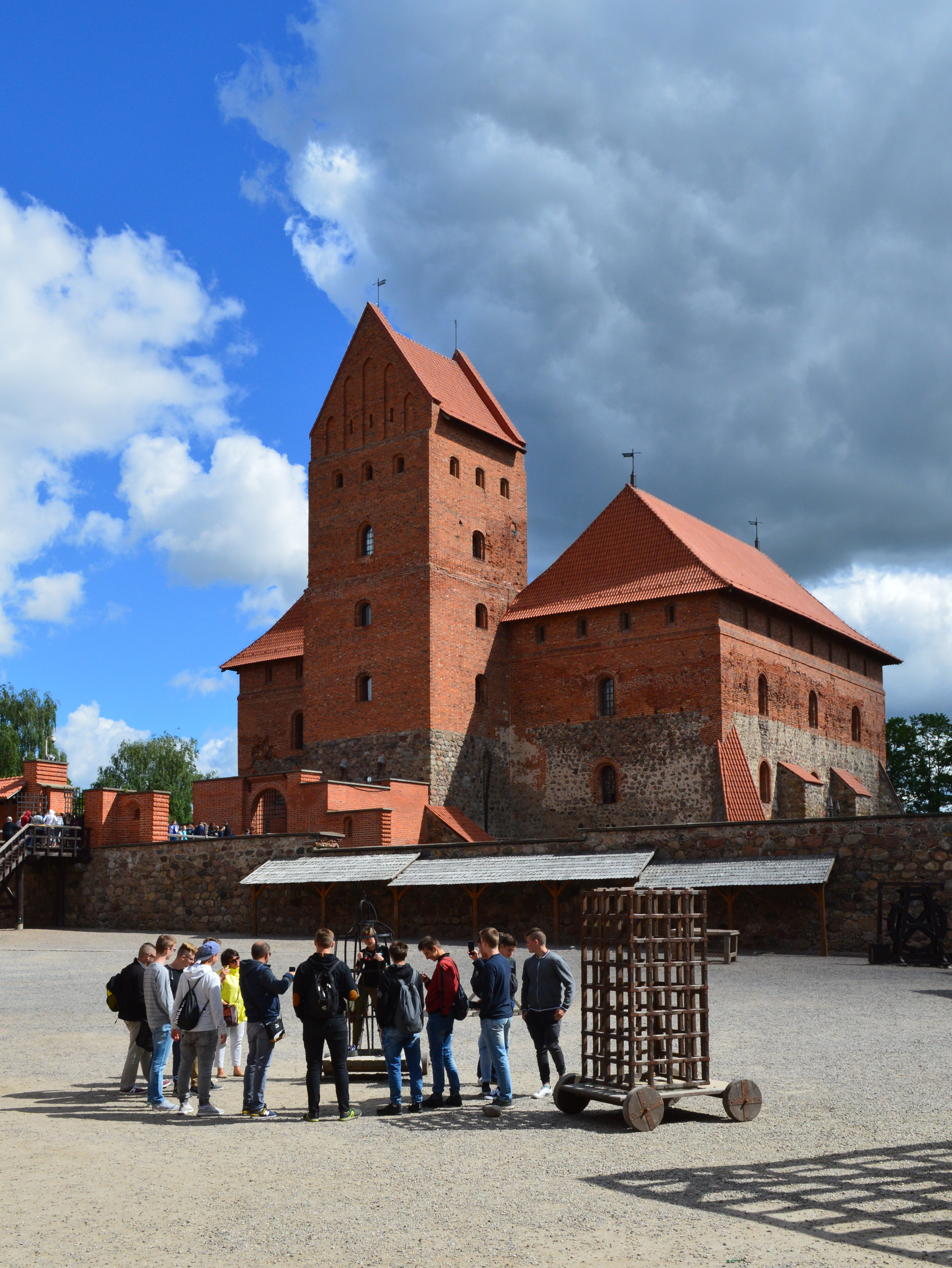
the Ducal Palace

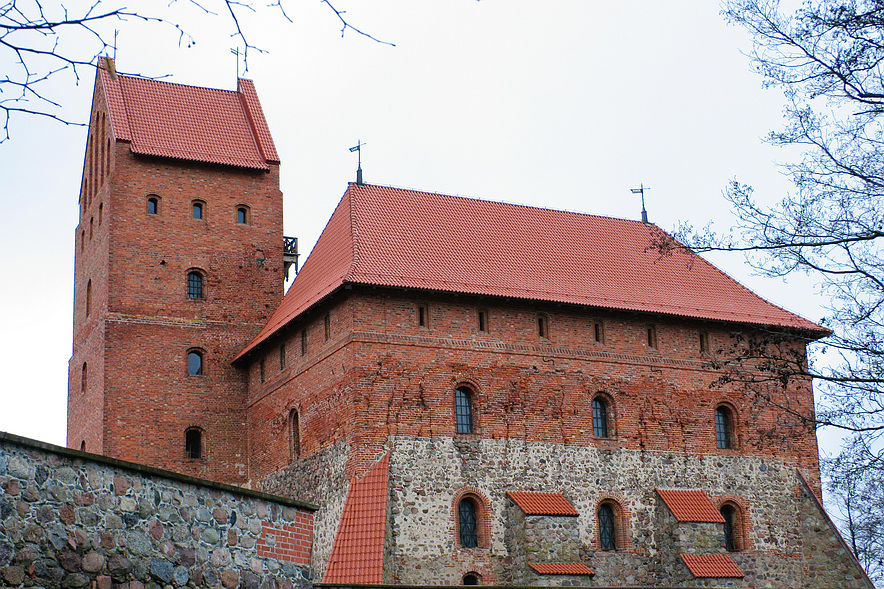
Side view of the Ducal Palace

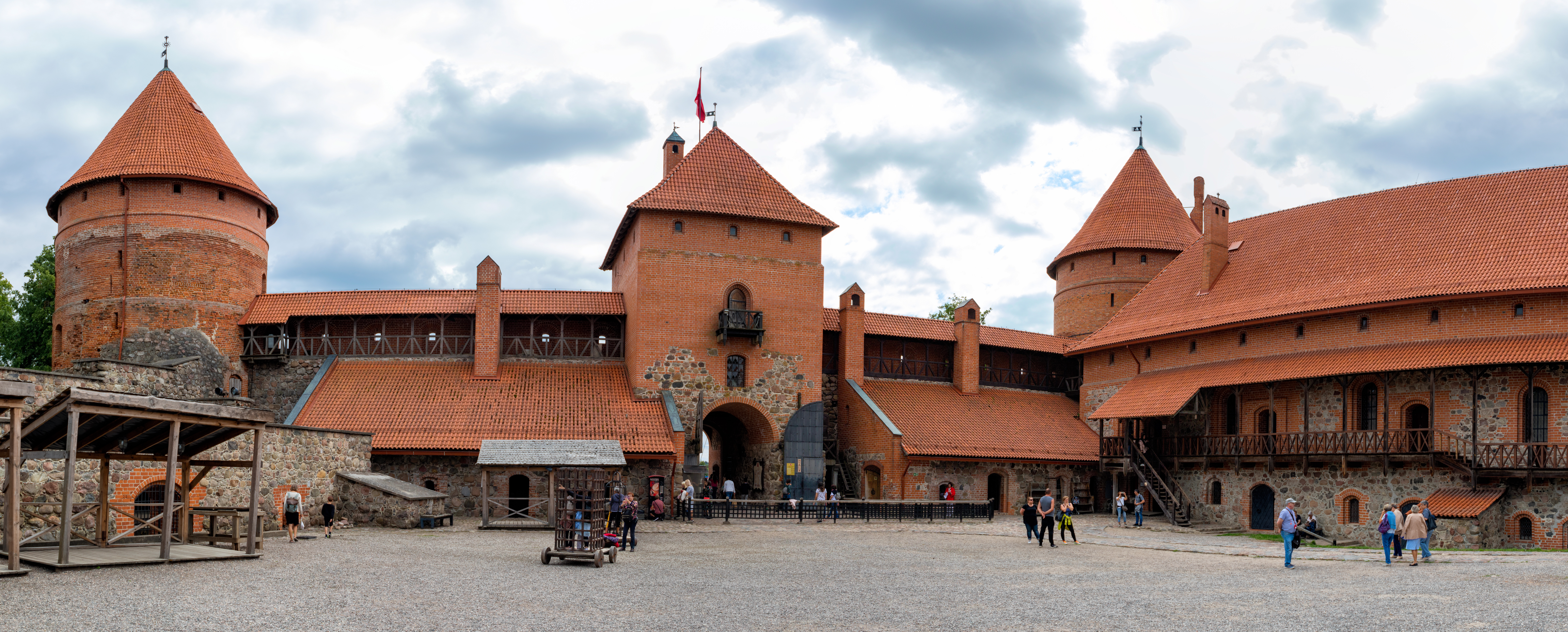
The entrance

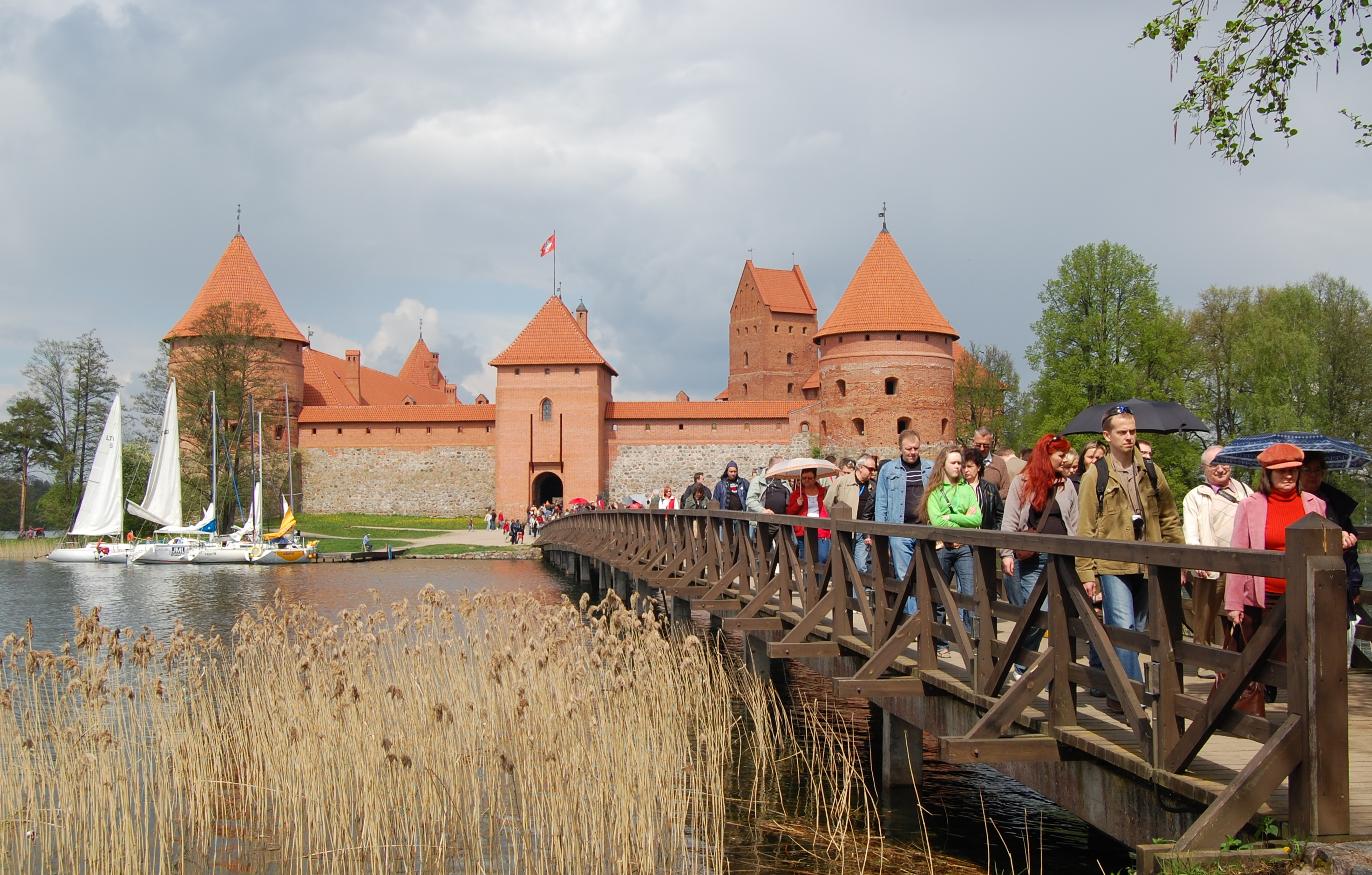
The bridge to the main castle gatehouse

Trakai Castle 2011

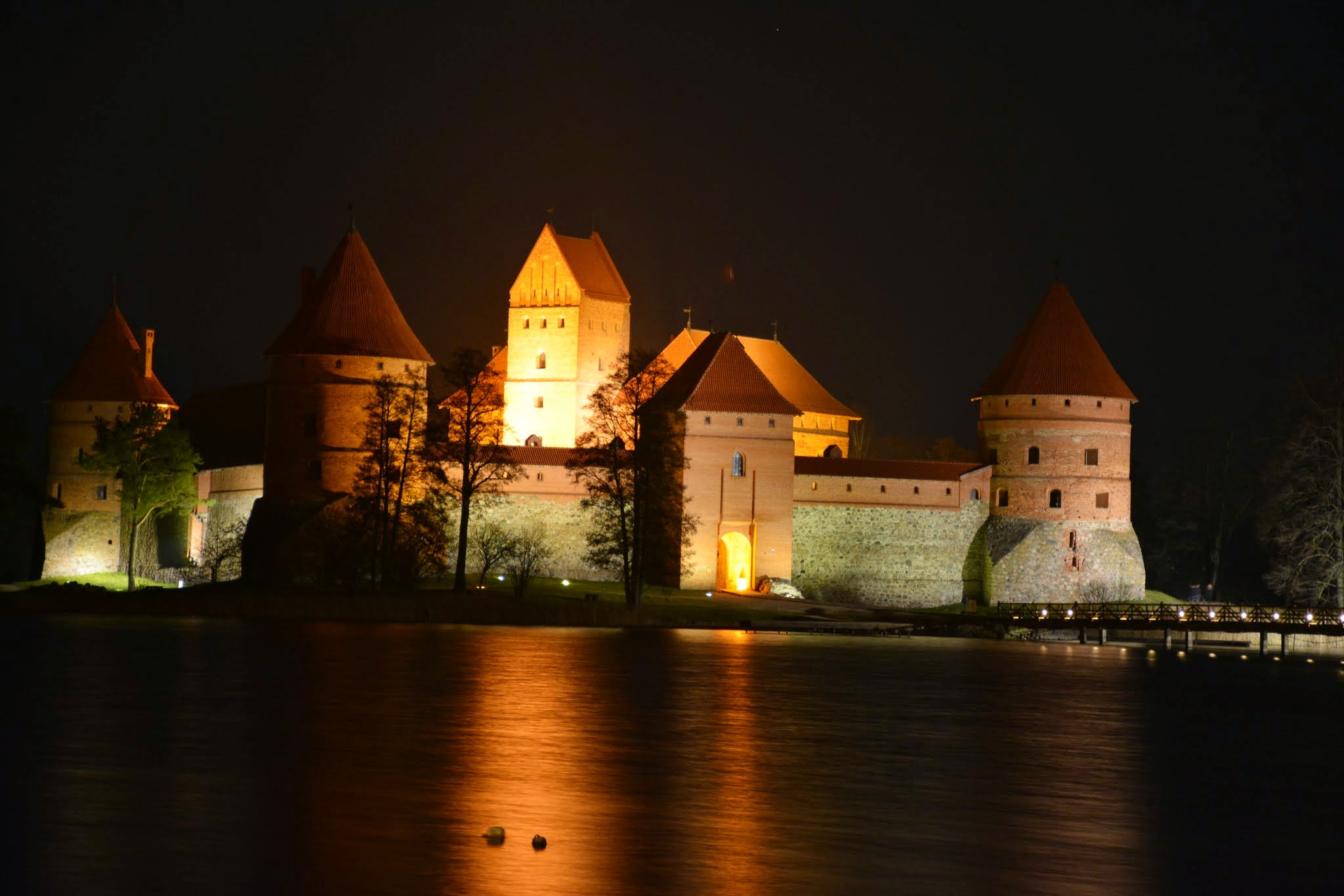
Castle at night

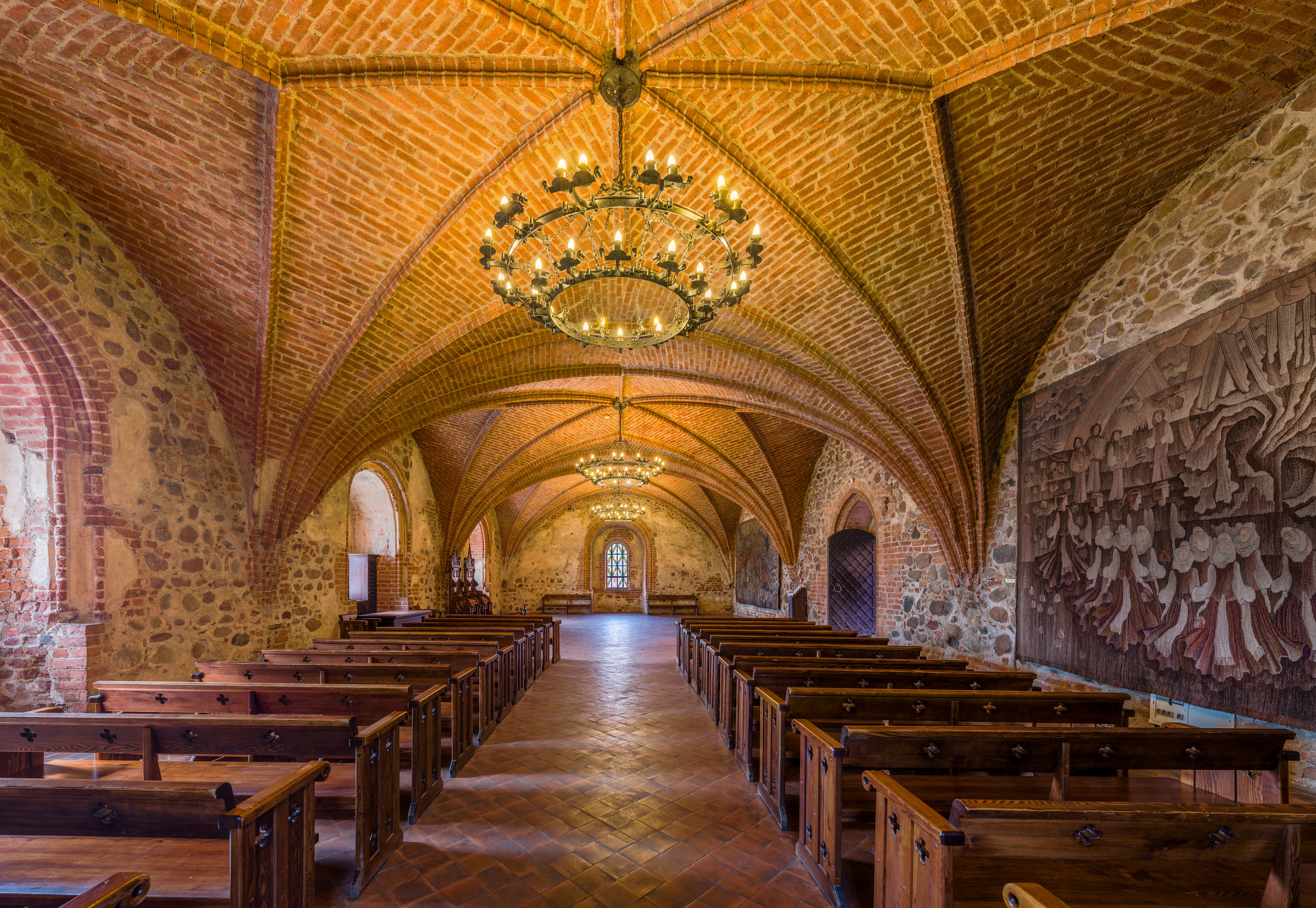
Chapel

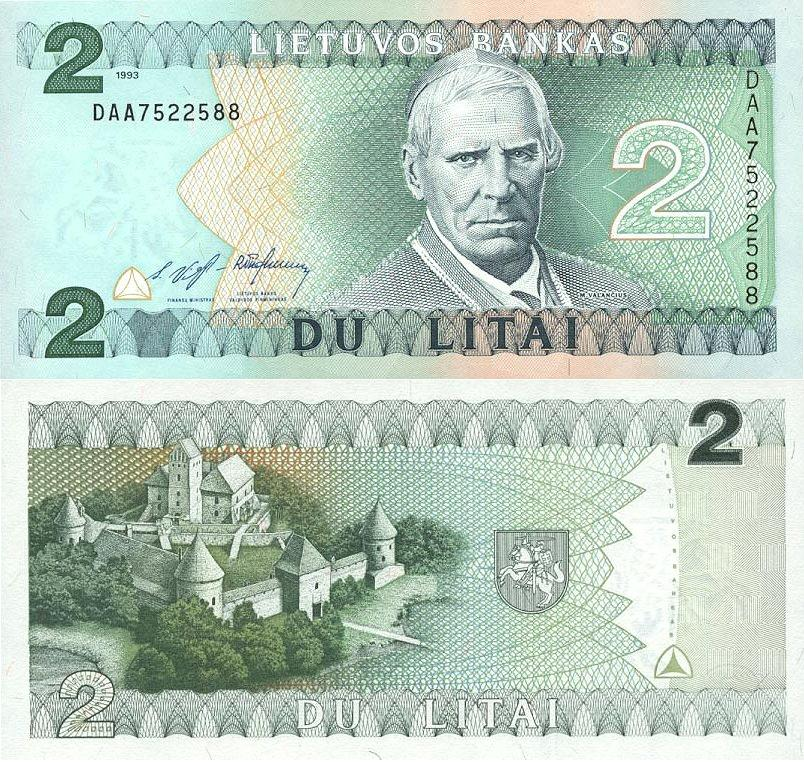
2 Lithuanian litas

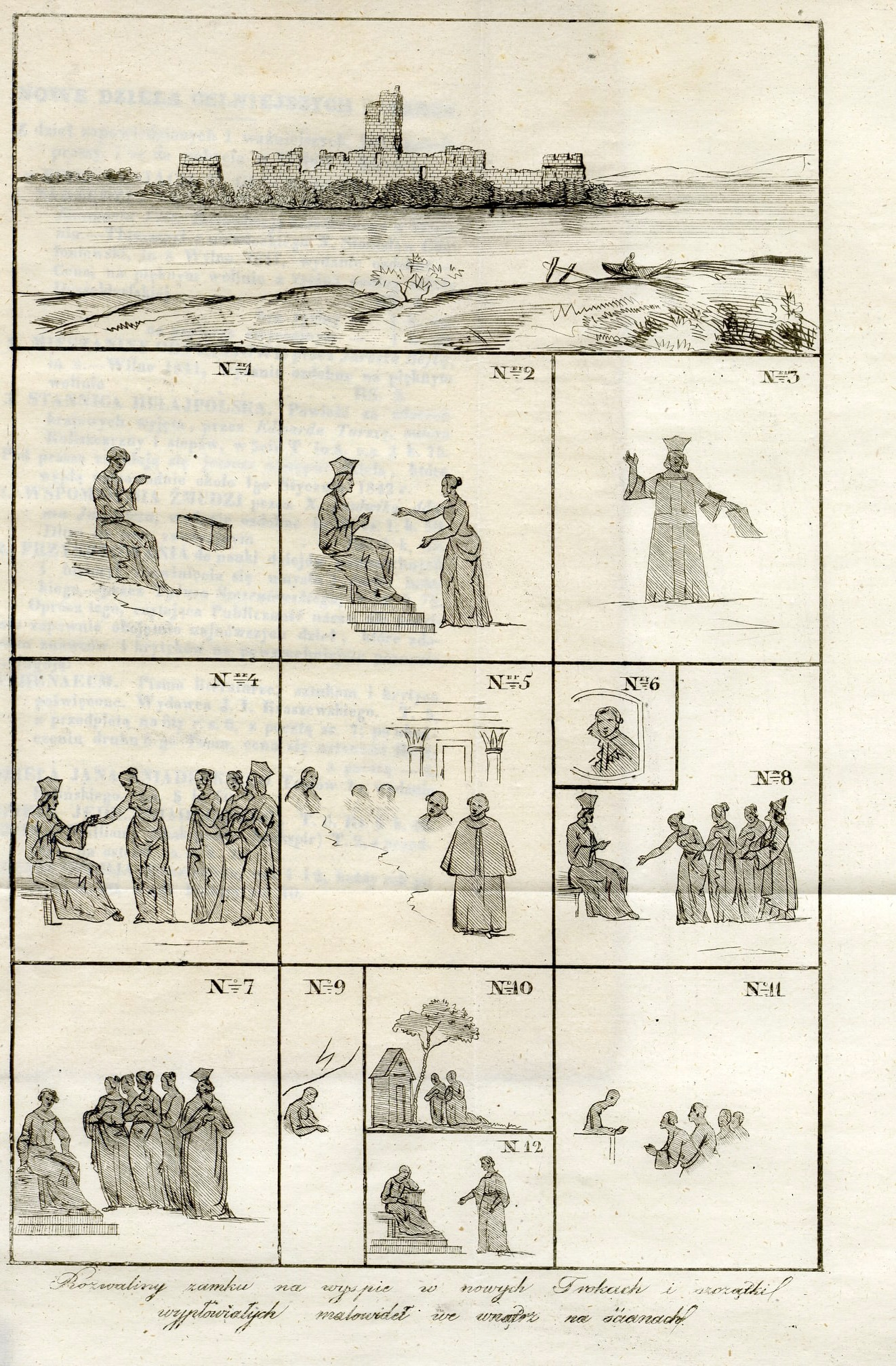
Gothic frescoes, depicting Grand Duke Vytautas the Great, which did not survive

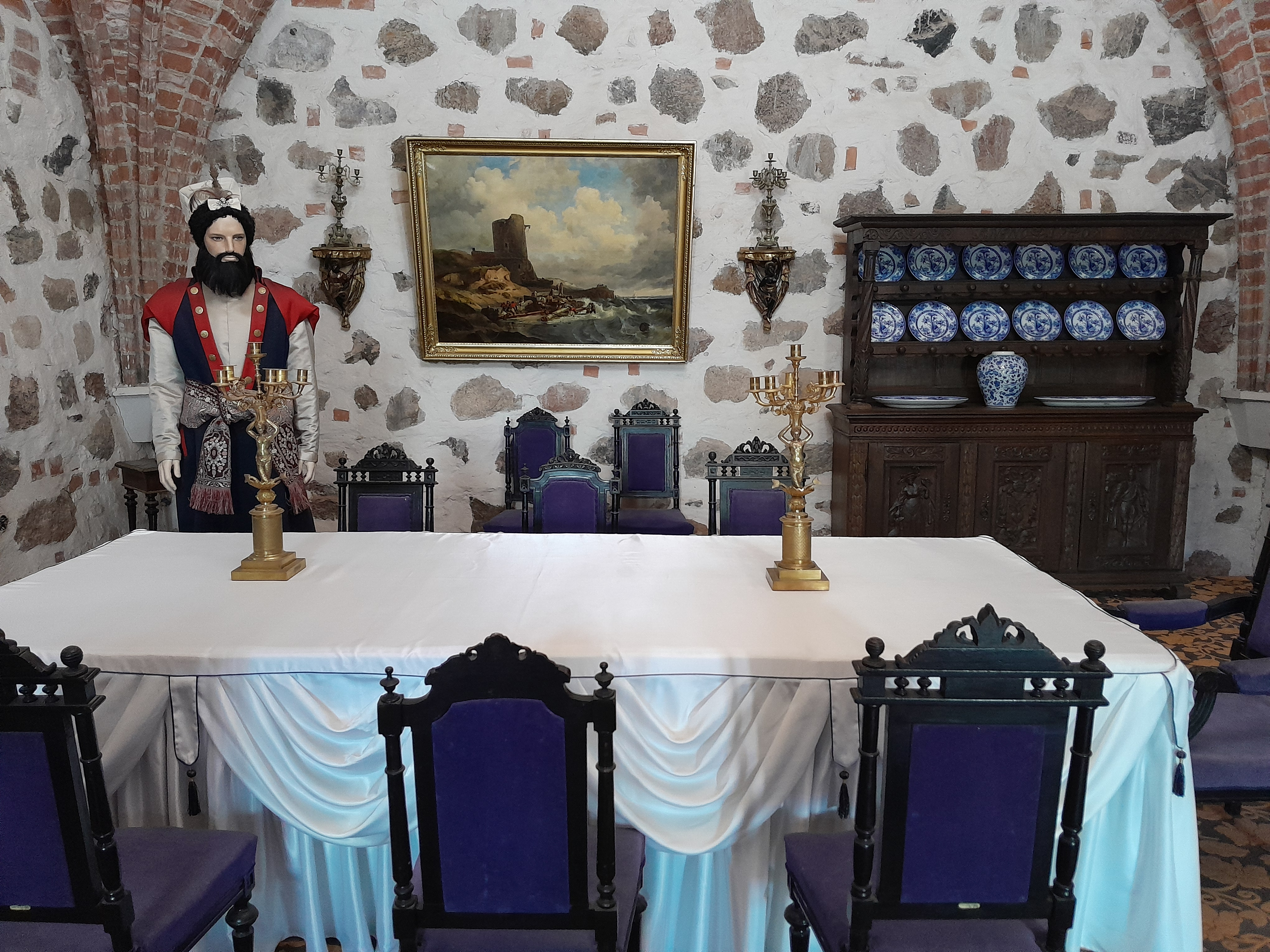
Exhibition inside castle

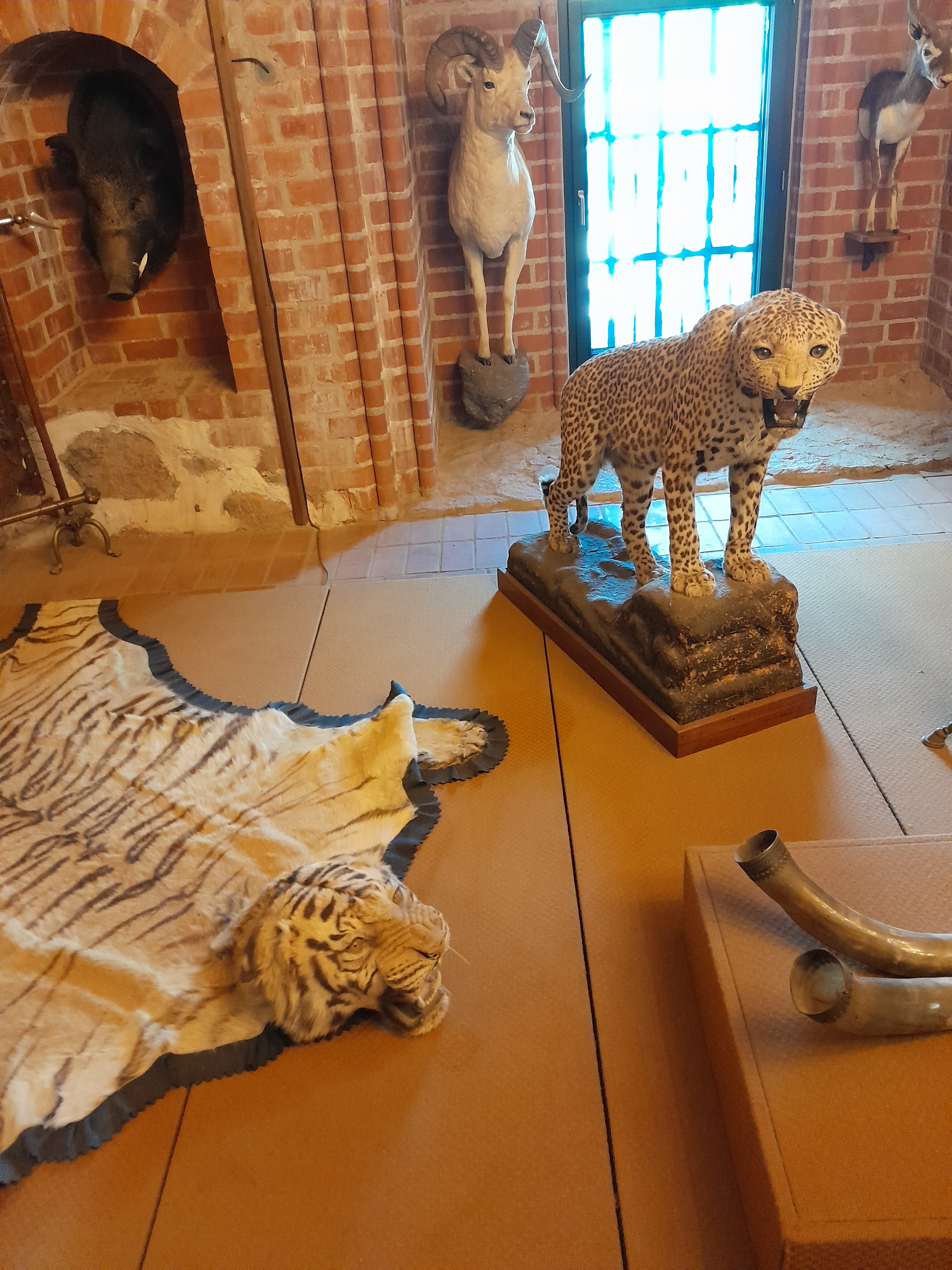
Hunted taxidermed animals, exhibited inside castle

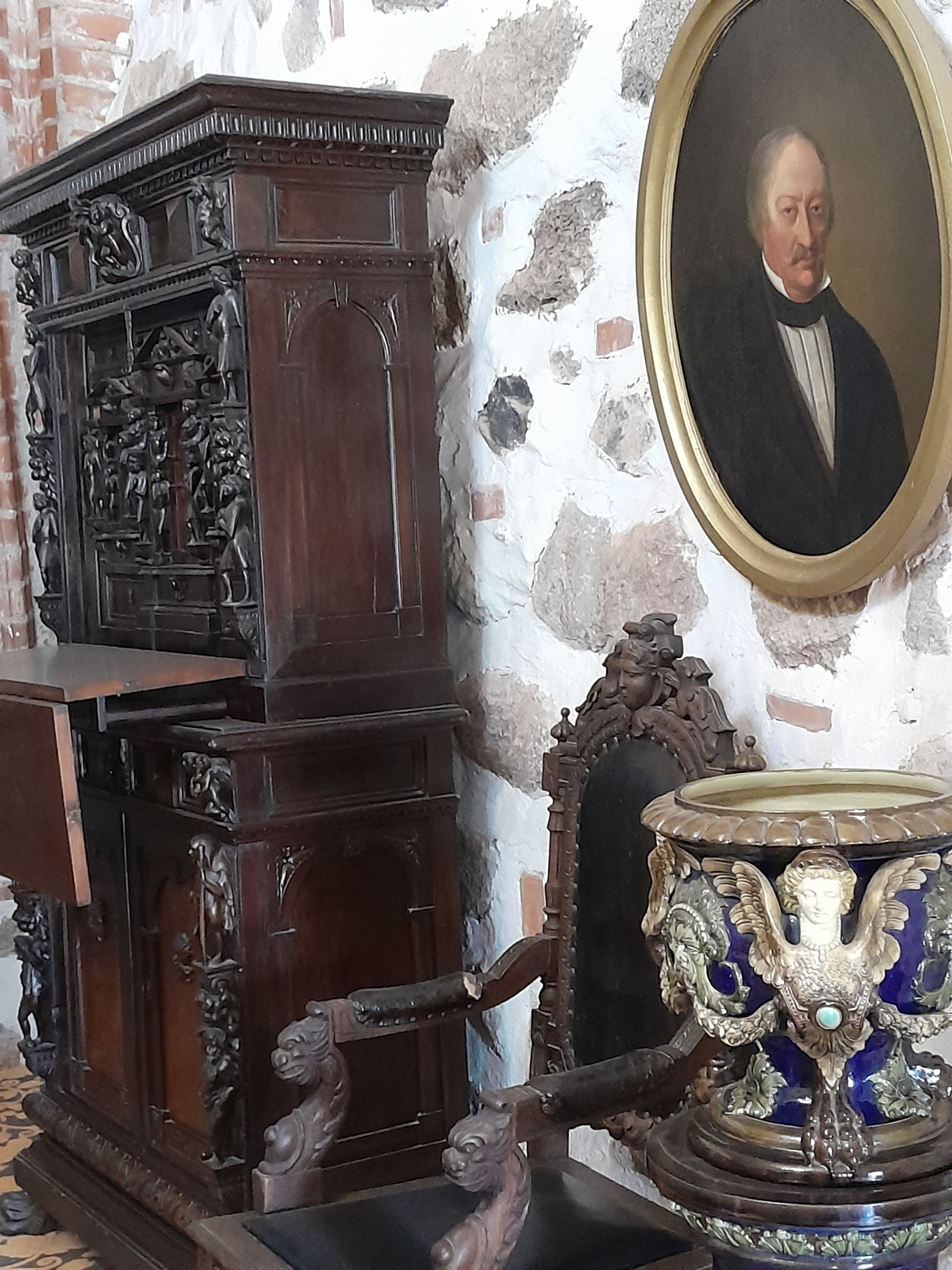
Interior of castle

== See also ==
- Trakai Historical National Park
- Gothic architecture in Lithuania
- List of castles in Lithuania
- Senieji Trakai Castle
- Trakai Peninsula Castle
