= Bronisław Zaleski =

Polish-Belarusian political activist, writer and publisher

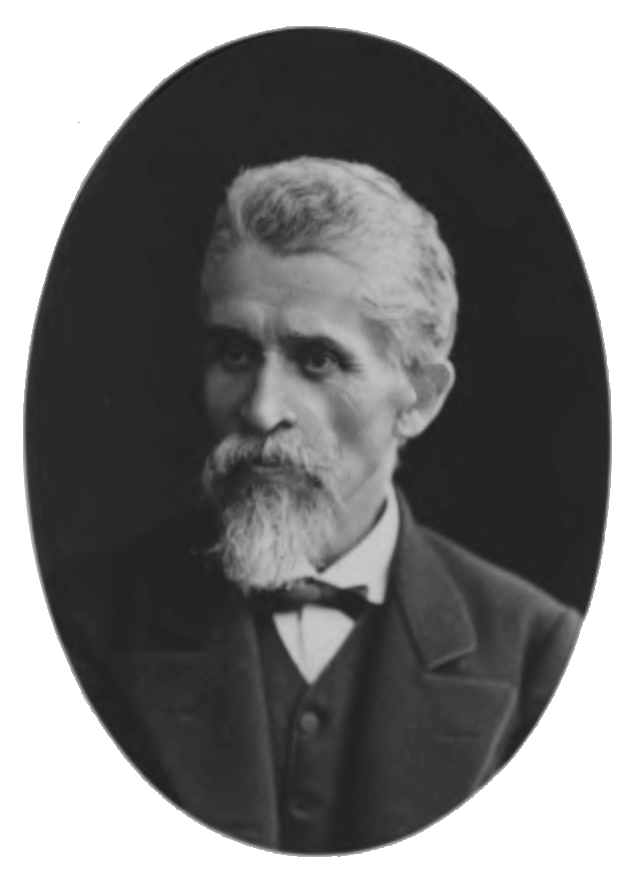
Bronisław Zaleski, c. 1875.

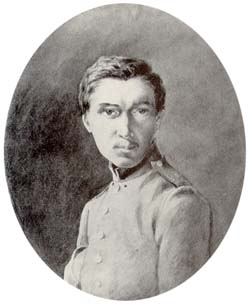
Bronisław Zaleski, self-portrait, 1850.

Bronisław Zaleski (born 1819 or 1820 in Raczkiewicze, Minsk Governorate, Russian Empire, now Belarus – died 2 January 1880 in Menton, France) was a Polish and Belarusian political activist, a writer and a publisher.

== Life and career ==
In 1838 Bronisław Zaleski, then a student at the Imperial University of Dorpat, was first arrested in connection with Polish pro-independence activities and then exiled to serve his first sentence in Chernihiv until 1848. In 1849 arrested again for renewed activities in Vilnius, and served as a soldier and then officer in Orenburg and Kazakhstan until 1856. During his second exile he established strong relations and gave his support to Taras Shevchenko.

In 1856 he returned to his family home in Raczkiewicze and lived in Belarus and Poland, for some time doing public service in connection with the land ownership reform.

After leaving the Russian Empire in the early 1860s on pretext of vacation, he lived in Dresden, Rome and Paris. There he initially administered trafficking of weapons for Polish independence cause from Europe into the Russian Empire's Poland and Belarus, later he was a secretary of the Towarzystwo Historyczno-Literackie (from 1866) and editor of Roczniki, director of the Polish Library in Paris (since 1868), member of the Academy of Learning. He was the author of Wygnańcy polscy w Orenburgu (Polish exiles in Orenburg) (1866); reminiscential and biographical works about Adam Jerzy Czartoryski, Józef Hieronim Kajsiewicz, Ludwik Orpiszewski. Zaleski was a follower of Hôtel Lambert and also a friend of Cyprian Kamil Norwid.

He died of tuberculosis in Menton.
