= Schönebeck (disambiguation) =

German pronunciation of "Schönebeck"

Schönebeck or Schoenebeck may refer to:

- Schönebeck, a town in Saxony-Anhalt, Germany
  - Schönebeck (district), a Landkreis in Saxony-Anhalt
  - Schönebeck (Elbe), a former Verwaltungsgemeinschaft (collective municipality) in Saxony-Anhalt
  - People from Schönebeck, Saxony-Anhalt
- Schönebeck, a small river in North Rhine-Westphalia, Germany, tributary of the Wupper
- Essen-Schönebeck, a suburb of Essen, North Rhine-Westfalia, Germany
  - SG Essen-Schönebeck, a soccer club in Essen
- Bremen-Schönebeck, a suburb of Bremen, Germany
  - Bremen-Schönebeck station, a railway station in Bremen
- Felix Schönebeck (born 1989), German politician
- Sarita Schoenebeck, American computer scientist
