= Schönebeck (Verwaltungsgemeinschaft) =

Municipality in Saxony-Anhalt, Germany

Coordinates: 52.017°N 11.750°E

Schönebeck (Elbe) is a former Verwaltungsgemeinschaft ("collective municipality") in the Salzlandkreis district, in Saxony-Anhalt, Germany. The seat of the Verwaltungsgemeinschaft was in Schönebeck. It was disbanded in January 2009.

== Municipalities ==
The Verwaltungsgemeinschaft Schönebeck (Elbe) consisted of the following municipalities:

1. Plötzky
2. Pretzien
3. Ranies
4. Schönebeck
