= Electoral Circle =

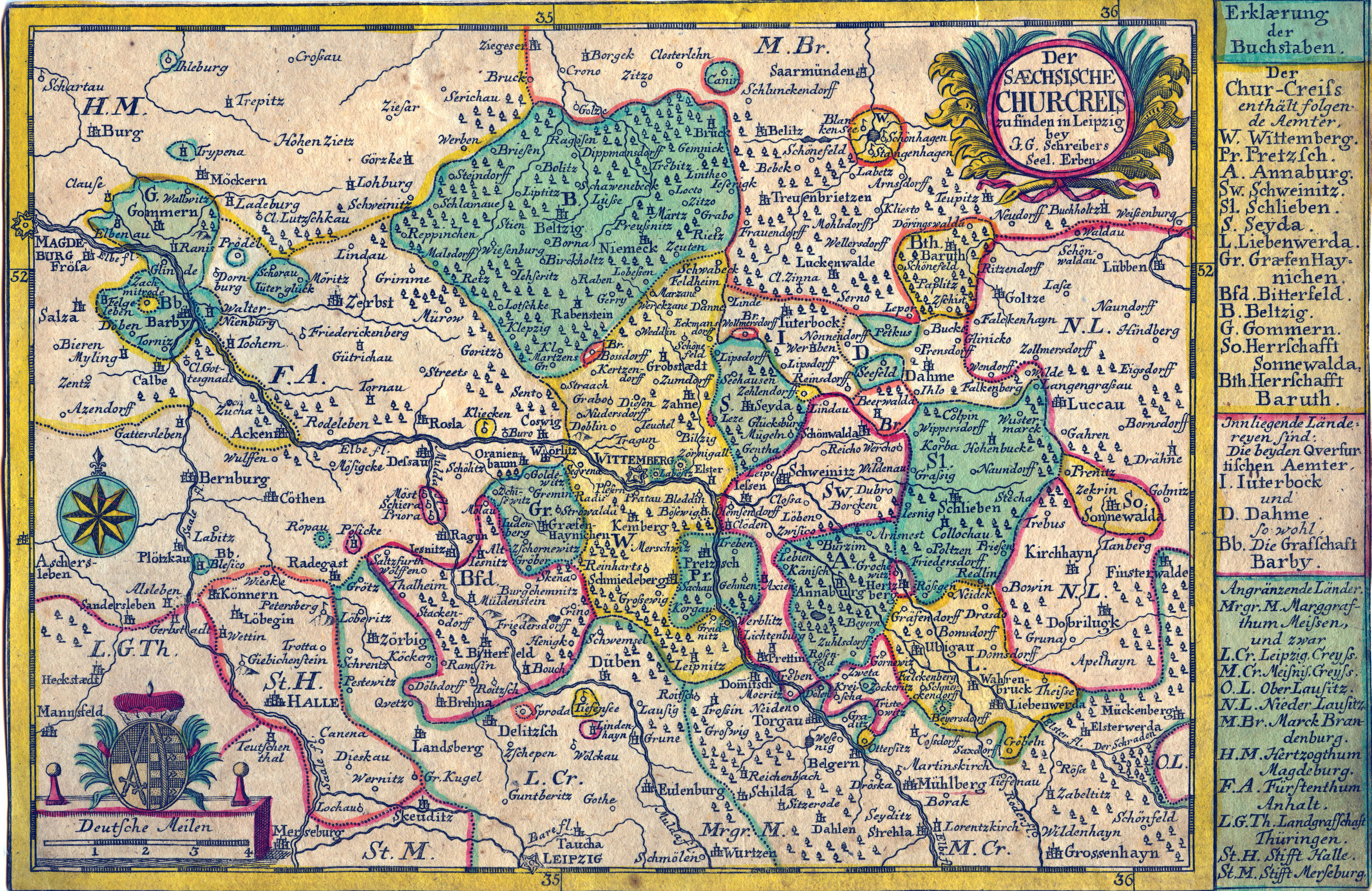
The Electoral Circle as recorded by Schreiber

The Electoral Circle as recorded in the Homaennischen Erben 1752

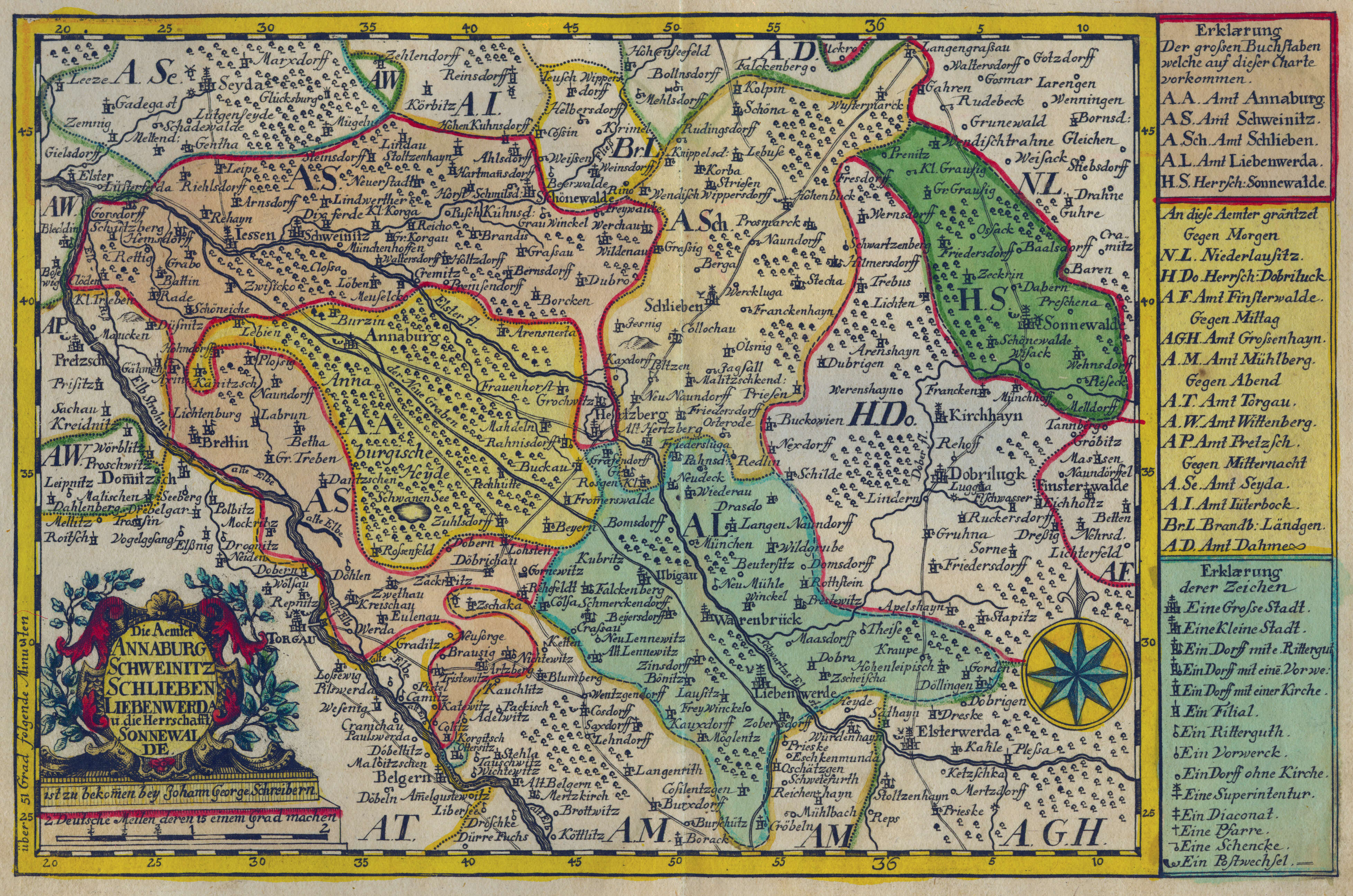
The southern Ämter as recorded by Schreiber

The Electoral Circle (German: Kurkreis), which was renamed in 1807 as the Wittenberg Circle (Wittenberger Kreis), was a historical territory that mostly emerged from the heartlands of the former Duchy of Saxe-Wittenberg. The circle (or district) was created in the reign of Frederick the Wise of Saxony in 1499 and was part of the Electorate of Saxony. The German name Kurkreis referred to the electoral dignity or status of the Saxon prince electors (Kurfürsten) to whom this territory was linked.

== Geographical extent ==
The region of the Electoral Circle today falls largely within the states of Brandenburg and Saxony-Anhalt. A smaller portion is located in North Saxony.

The rivers Elbe, Black Elster and, for a short section, Mulde flowed through the Circle. The most important settlement in the Circle was the town of Wittenberg, where the Reformation started.

== History ==
John Frederick the Magnanimous was defeated by Emperor Charles V in the Schmalkaldic War at the Battle of Mühlberg and was captured there on 24 April 1547. The emperor removed his electoral dignity and part of his electoral estates and enfeoffed them to his cousin Maurice of Saxony. As a result, Saxe-Wittenberg was transferred from the Ernestines to the Albertine line of the family.

Maurice of Saxony embarked on a reorganisation of his Electorate. Alongside six other circles, the Electoral Circle was formed, with its capital at Wittenberg. The Circle originated in the former Askanian estates, which comprised the Ämter (districts) of Annaburg, Belzig, Gräfenhainichen, Liebenwerda, Pretzsch / Elbe, Seyda and Wittenberg; the old County of Brehna with its districts of Bitterfeld (1738), Schlieben and Schweinitz; the Burgraviate of Magdeburg with the Gommern districts of Gommern, Elbenau, Ranies, Glinde, Plötzky; the County of Barby; and the Lordships of Sonnewalde and Baruth.

After Elector Frederick Augustus I of Saxony joined the Confederation of the Rhine and his realm became the Kingdom of Saxony in the Treaty of Posen, the Electoral Circle was renamed on 30 January 1807 to the Wittenberg Circle. That year the districts in the Burgraviate of Magdeburg and County of Barby were reassigned to the King of Westphalia, who annexed them to the Department of the Elbe.

In order to contribute to the "restoration of order and peace in Europe", on 18 May 1815 Prussia and Saxony entered a peace and friendship treaty in which Saxony ceded three-fifths of its territory to Prussia including the Wittenberg Circle. On 22 May 1815 the majority of the Wittenberg Circle became part of the Regierungsbezirk Merseburg of the new Province of Saxony, constituted from most of the Saxon territories it had acquired, along with territory returned to Prussia from Westphalia – the Altmark, Magdeburg, Halberstadt, Eichsfeld, etc. – and various other territories acquired as a result of the Napoleonic wars; the remainder, including Belzig, Sonnewalde and Baruth (as well as the Weissenfels/Querfurt Ämter of Jüterbog and Dahme which were attached to the Electoral Circle), became part of the Province of Brandenburg. The Circle then comprised an area of 66 square German miles with 140,000 inhabitants.
