= Edita Rudelienė =

Lithuanian politician (born 1978)

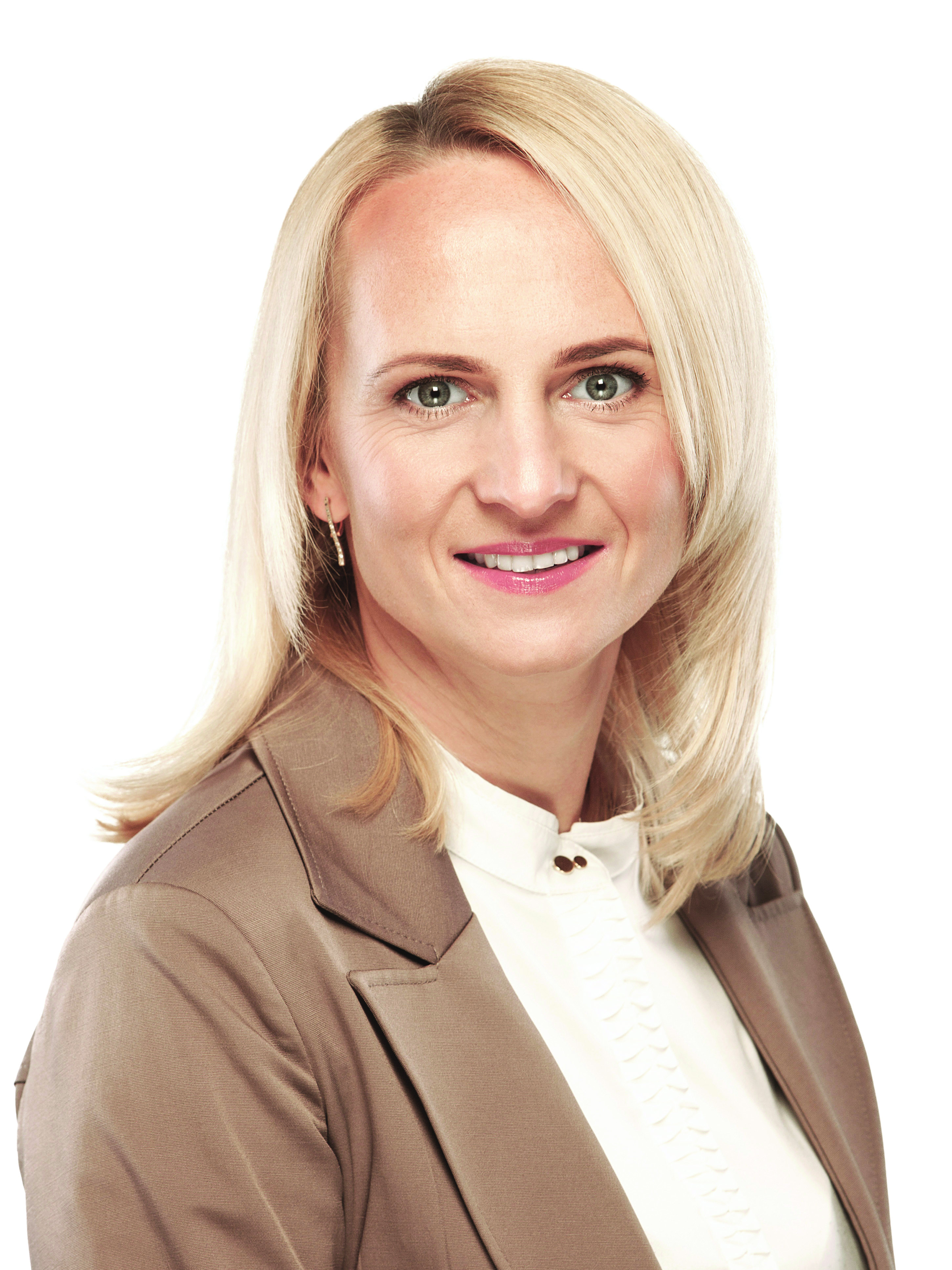
- Rudelienė in 2015

Member of the Seimas
- Incumbent
- Assumed office 10 May 2021
- Preceded by: Kęstutis Glaveckas

Mayor of the Trakai District Municipal Council
- In office 2011–2021
- Preceded by: Vincas Kapočius
- Succeeded by: Andrius Šatevičius

Personal details
- Born: 19 October 1978 (age 47) Trakai
- Party: Liberals' Movement

Edita Rudelienė (born October 19, 1978) is a Lithuanian politician, who is currently a member of the Seimas, and a former mayor of the Trakai District Municipality.

== Early life and education ==
Rudelienė graduated from Vilnius University in 2003 with a degree in social work.

== Career ==
She was part of the Trakai District Municipality Administration from 2003 to 2014. She was elected to the Trakai District Municipal Council in 2011, and in 2014 was elected mayor of the district. After the death of Kęstutis Glaveckas, she was appointed member of the Seimas, and won reelection to the seat in 2024. She was also Deputy chairwoman of Liberals' Movement from 2021 to 2023.
