= Bad Salzelmen =

Spa resort, a quarter of Schönebeck (Elbe) in Saxony-Anhalt, Germany

Coordinates: 52°00′N 11°43′E

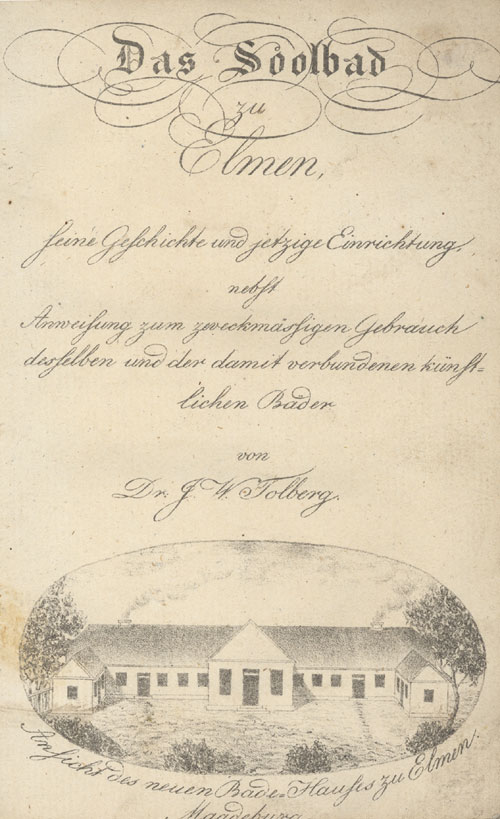
J. W. Tolberg: The Soolbad in Elmen. Its history and current furnishings, together with instructions for its proper use and the associated artificial baths, 1822. Title page with an illustration of the bathhouse.

Bad Salzelmen has been a district of Schönebeck (Elbe) since 1932 and is a state-approved spa in the Salzlandkreis in Saxony-Anhalt, Germany. It was founded in 1894 when the town of Groß Salze absorbed the neighbouring town of Elmen. The town was renamed to Bad Salzelmen in 1926.

== History ==
Bad Salzelmen can look back on more than 800 years of salt production history. In Elmen brine was already mined in the 12th century. With the "white gold" the Pfänner, or later also called Salzgrafen, gained great influence on the town. As a Pfännerschaft, they were not only a commercial association, but also spoke the law as authorities. Parts of the town wall from the 14th century, the former town hall from the 15th century and the Johanniskirche from the middle of the 15th century still bear witness to the wealth and power of the Pfänners. Today the Salzlandmuseum is located in the town hall. In 1680 the town of Groß Salze went to the Brandenburg-Prussian Duchy of Magdeburg. Groß Salze as a so-called Immediatstadt was directly subordinated to the government of the duchy and lay in the wood circle. Between 1756 and 1765, the graduation house was built with a total length of 1837 metres, making it the largest ever built. The "Königlich Preußische Saline" (Royal Prussian Salt Works) was the largest state enterprise in Prussia at that time. In 1776 the 32 meter high brine tower was built near the graduation house. It served the brine production by means of a Dutch "wind art". The saltworks were connected to the port of Schönebeck by a company railway.

The discovery of the healing effect of brine by Johann Wilhelm Tolberg marked the beginning of the history of the spa town of Bad Salzelmen. Germany's first brine spa was opened here in 1802. In 1815 Ernst Leopold Fabian was appointed salt inspector.

The brine was extracted by underground flushing. The caverns thus created ("Graf-Moltke-Schacht") were later used as underground inhalation rooms and during the last years of the Second World War to store, among other things, museum collections of the Berlin State Museums and archives of the Deutsche Akademie and the Prussian Privy State Archives.

The extraction of brine for the purpose of salt production was stopped in 1967, but the brine is still the basis for the spa operation. 300.4 metres of the original graduation house are still preserved today, which serve as an open-air inhalatorium. An inhalatorium is attached to the graduation house in a south-westerly direction. The "brine park" with the recreational pool "Solequell", the spa centre "Lindenbad" and the "Kunsthof" (partly in the brine tower) are today attractions for those seeking relaxation and spa guests. The rehabilitation clinic Bad Salzelmen, built in 1995, is the centre of modern rehabilitation medicine in the area of brine treatment.

== Notable people from Bad Salzelmen ==
- Katharina Heise (1891-1964), sculptor and illustrator

== Gallery ==
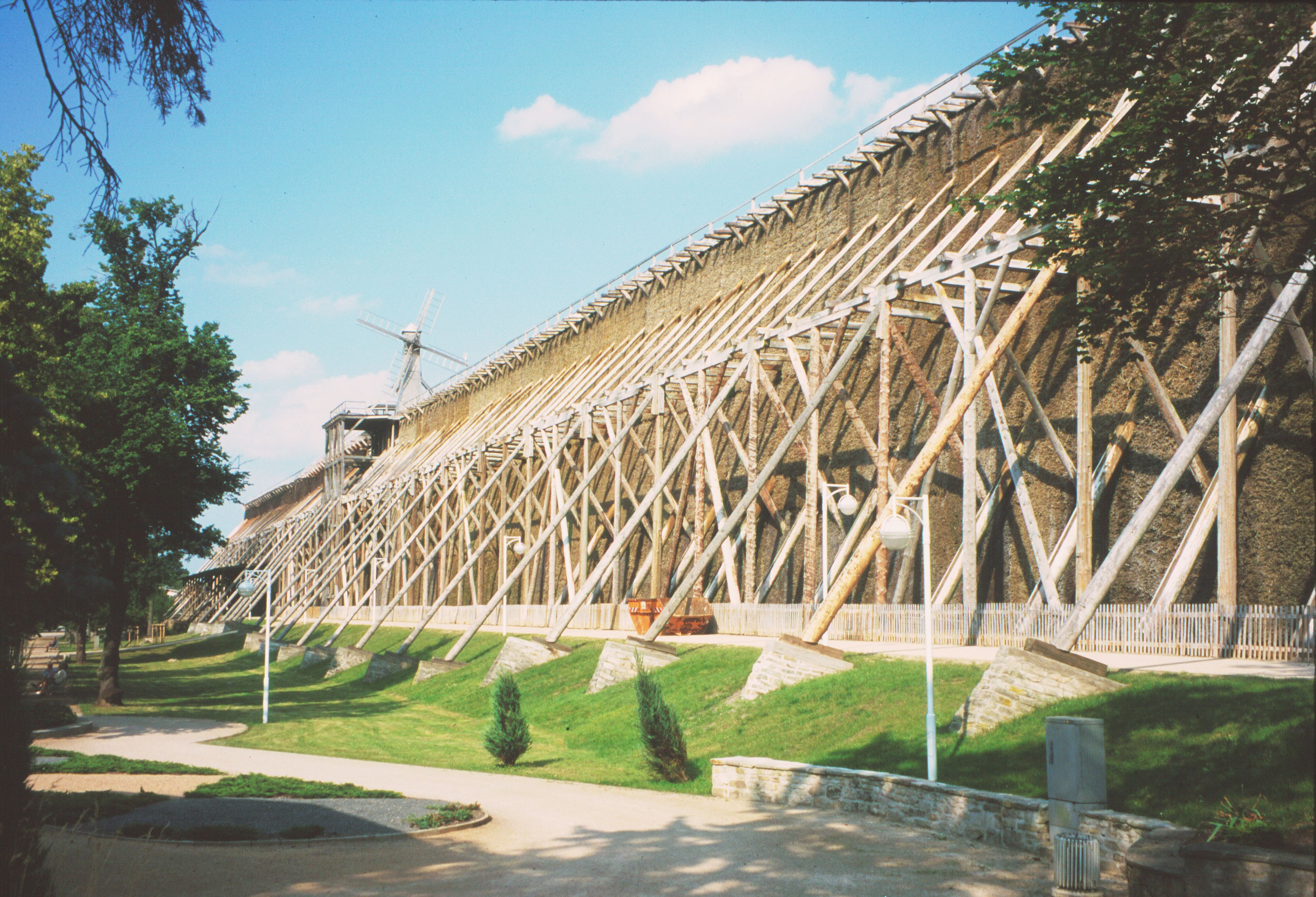
Graduation house with „Windkunst“ (brine pumping station).

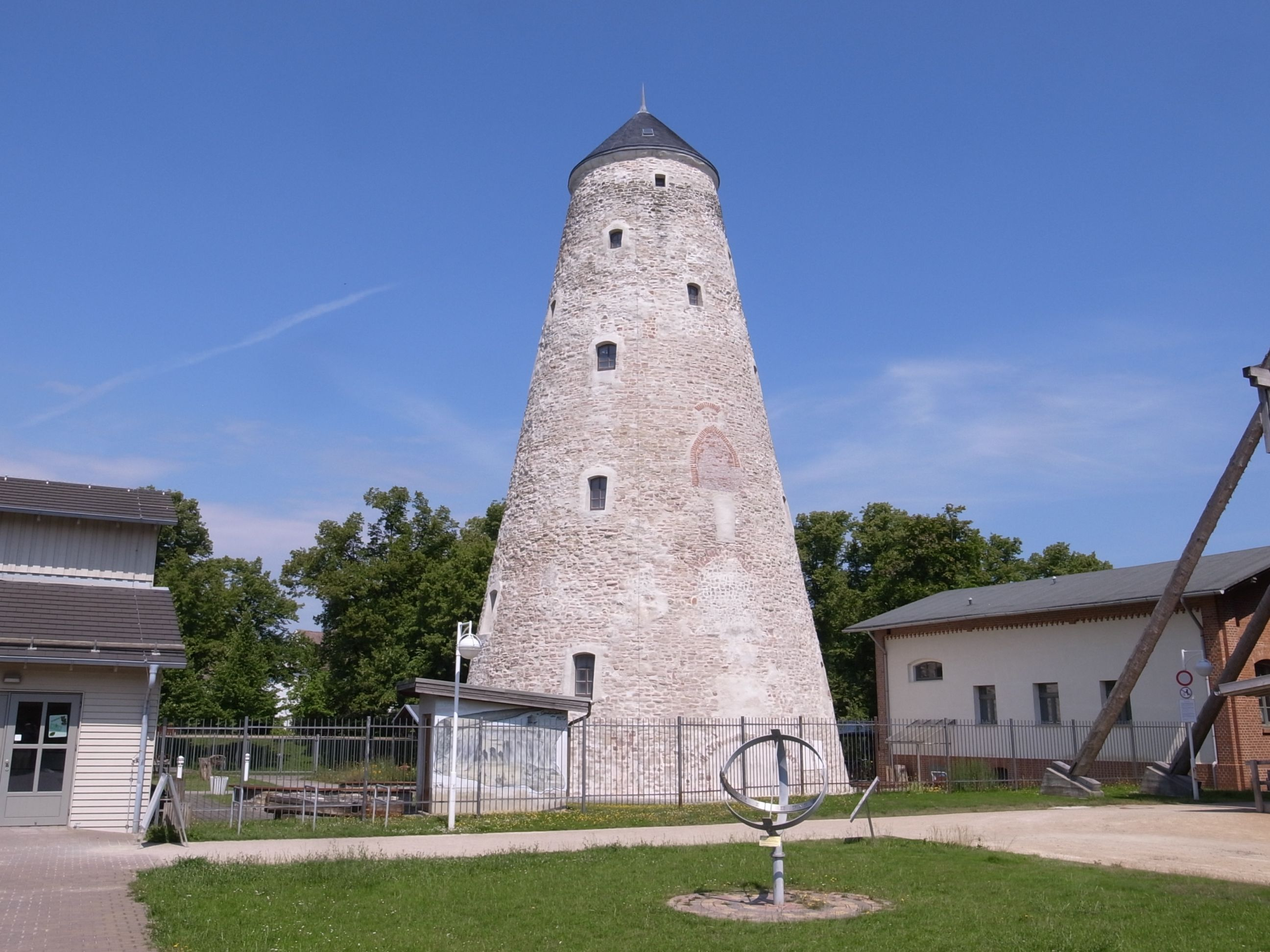
Brine tower.

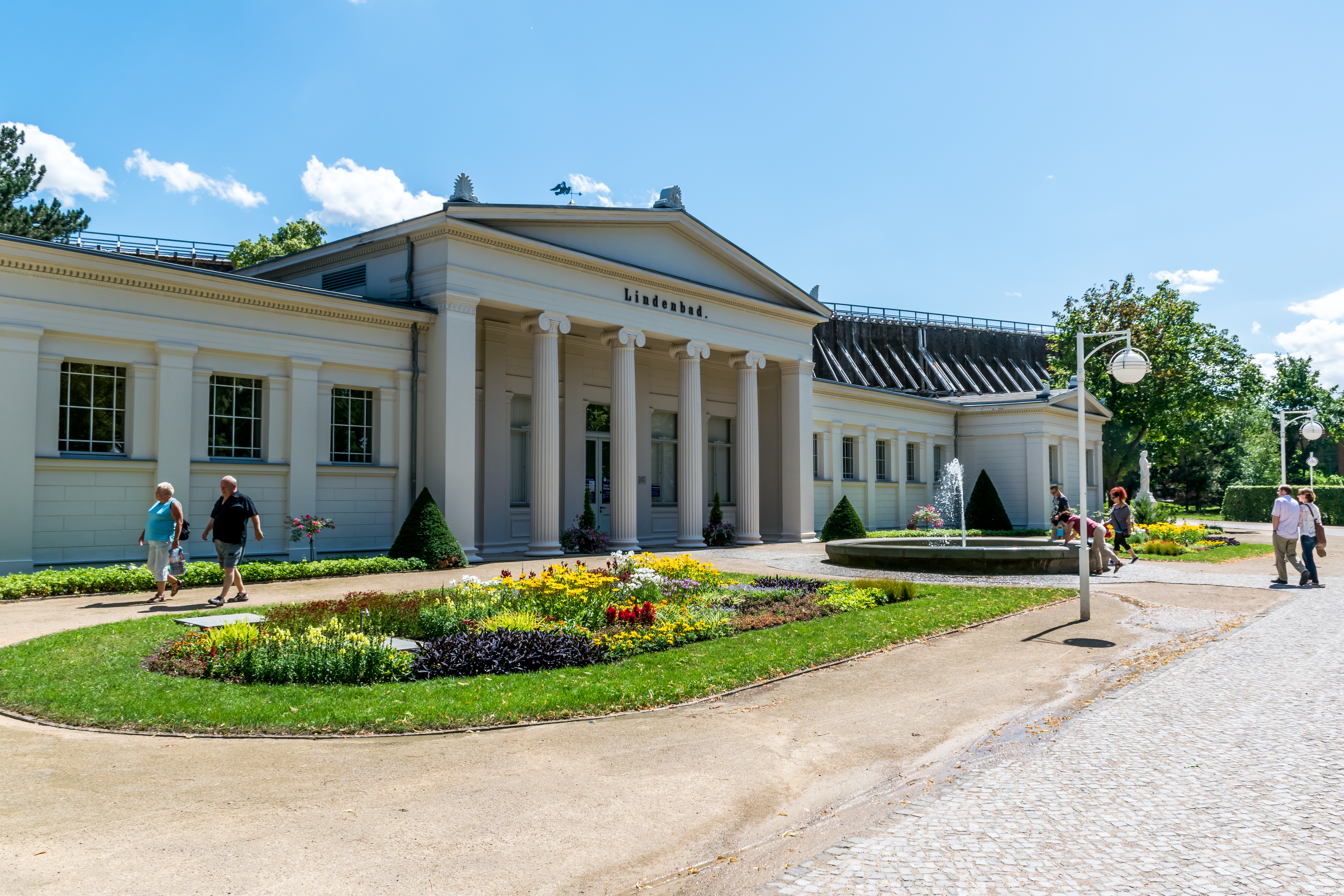
Spa resource centre „Lindenbad“.
