= Schönebeck =

Town in Saxony-Anhalt, Germany

- Town
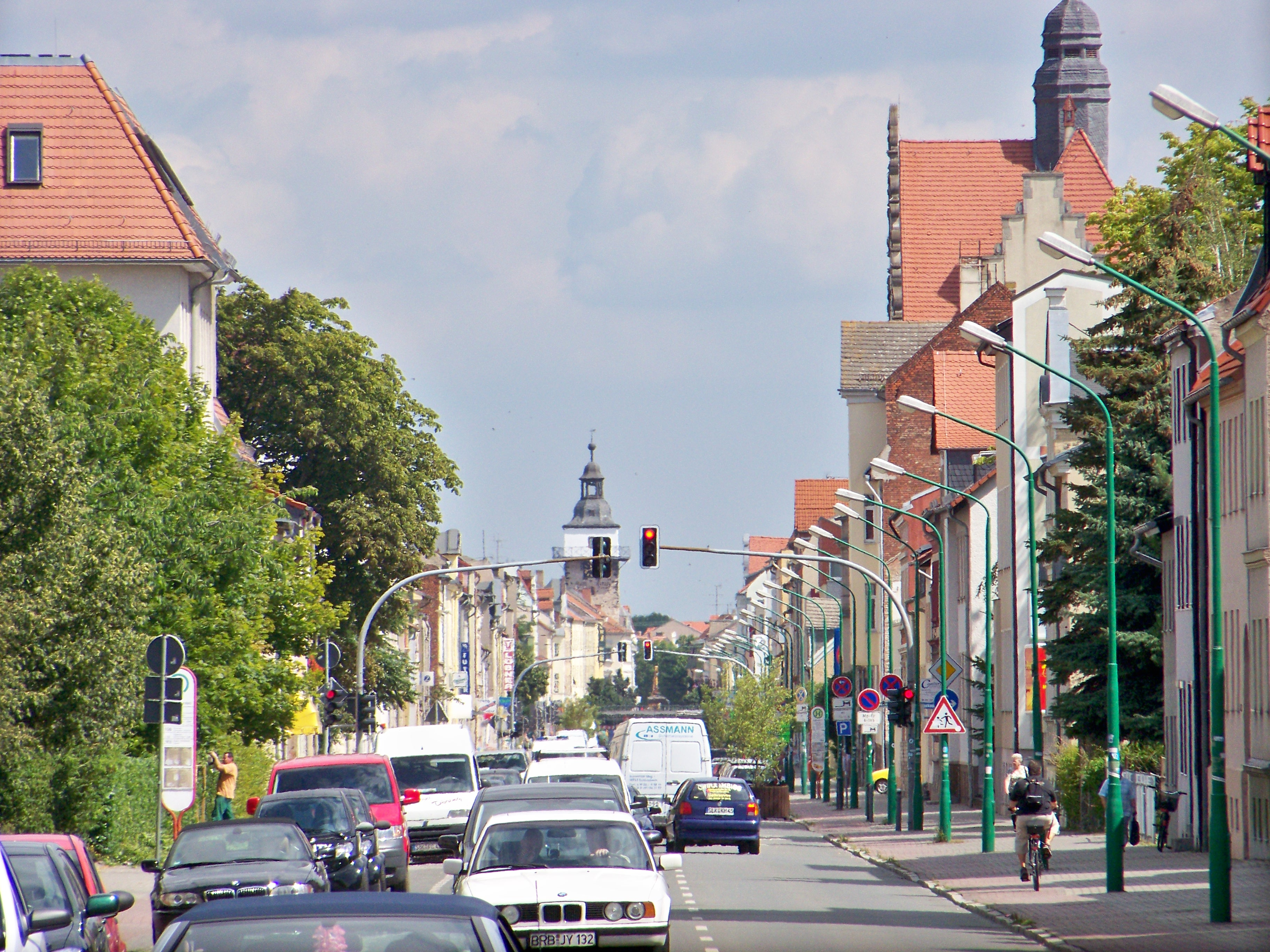
- Schönebeck centre

- Coat of arms

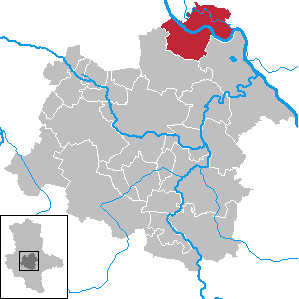
- Location of Schönebeck within Salzlandkreis district
- Interactive map of Schönebeck
- Location within Germany Location within Saxony-Anhalt
- Coordinates: 52°1′N 11°45′E
- Country: Germany
- State: Saxony-Anhalt
- District: Salzlandkreis

Government
  - Mayor (2020–27): Bert Knoblauch (CDU)

Area
  - Total: 86.05 km^{2} (33.22 sq mi)
- Elevation: 51 m (167 ft)

Population (2025-12-31)
  - Total: 30,250
  - Density: 351.5/km^{2} (910.5/sq mi)
- Time zone: UTC+01:00 (CET)
  - Summer (DST): UTC+02:00 (CEST)
- Postal codes: 39218
- Dialling codes: 03928
- Vehicle registration: SLK, ASL, BBG, SBK, SFT
- Website: www.schoenebeck.de

Schönebeck (German: [ˈʃøːnəbɛk]), officially Schönebeck (Elbe), is a town in the district of Salzlandkreis, in Saxony-Anhalt, Germany. It is situated on the left bank of the Elbe, approximately 14 kilometres (9 miles) southeast of Magdeburg.

For much of the twentieth century it was noted for its large salt mine.

The manor house of Schönebeck was owned by Count Heinrich von Blumenthal, Mayor of Magdeburg, until 1810.

The firm of Sellier & Bellot opened a munitions factory there in the 1829.

== Geography ==
The town Schönebeck consists of Schönebeck proper and three Ortschaften or municipal divisions that were independent municipalities until January 2009, when they were absorbed into Schönebeck:

- Plötzky
- Pretzien
- Ranies

== Twin towns – sister cities ==
Schönebeck is twinned with:

- Garbsen, Germany
- Söke, Turkey
- Trakai, Lithuania

Schönebeck also has friendly relations with Farmers Branch, Texas, United States.

== Notable people ==
- Christoph Grabinski (born 1990), footballer
- Felix Schönebeck (born 1989), German politician
- Katharina Heise (1891–1964), sculptor, painter and printmaker
- Willi Krakau (1911–1995), racing driver
- Erik Neutsch (1931–2013), writer

== See also ==
- Schönebeck (Verwaltungsgemeinschaft)
