= Trocka =

Trocka may refer to:

- Trocki (feminine: Trocka), a Polish-language toponymic surname
- Trocka metro station, a Warsaw Metro station
