= Trakai =

- City
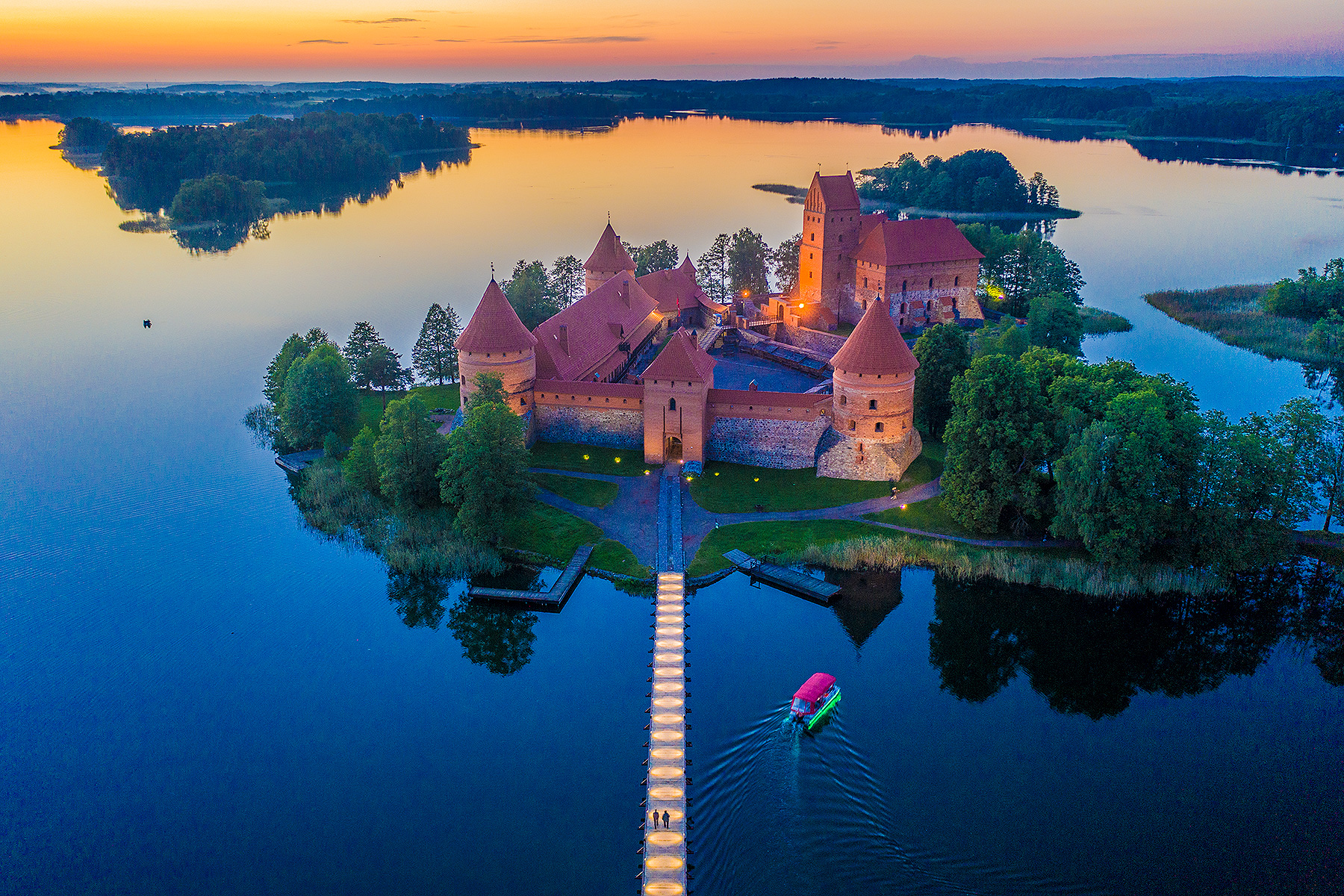
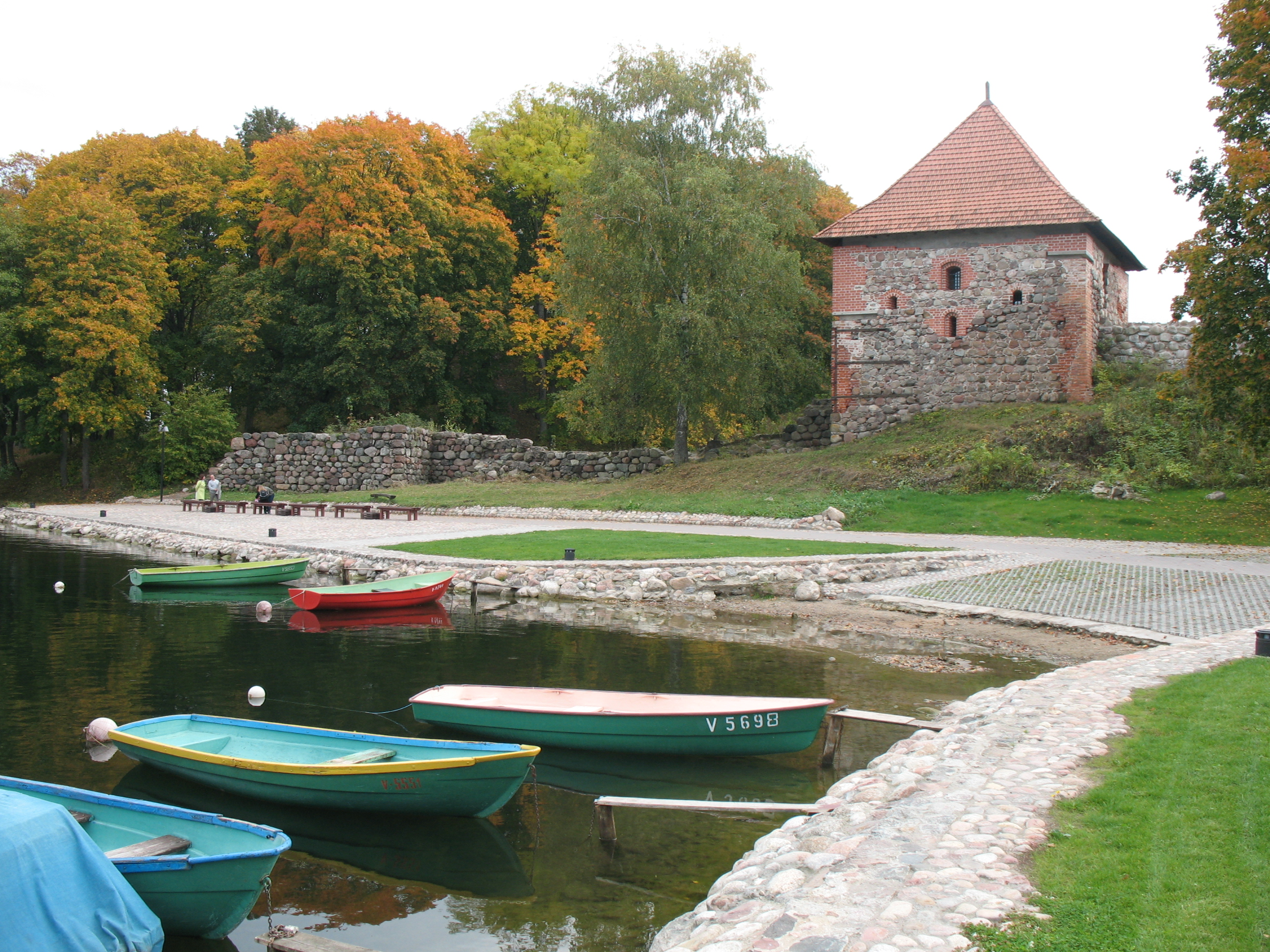
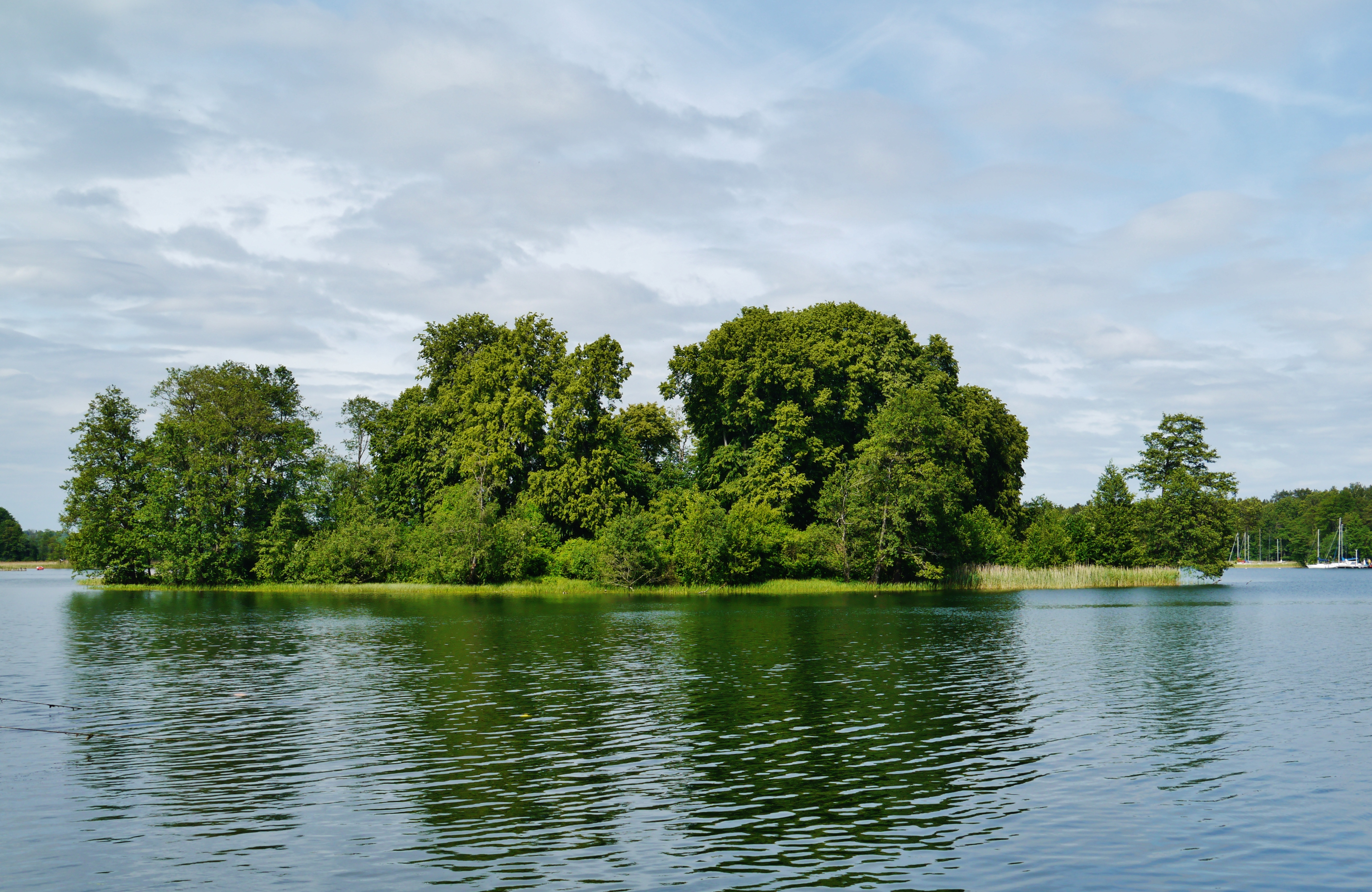
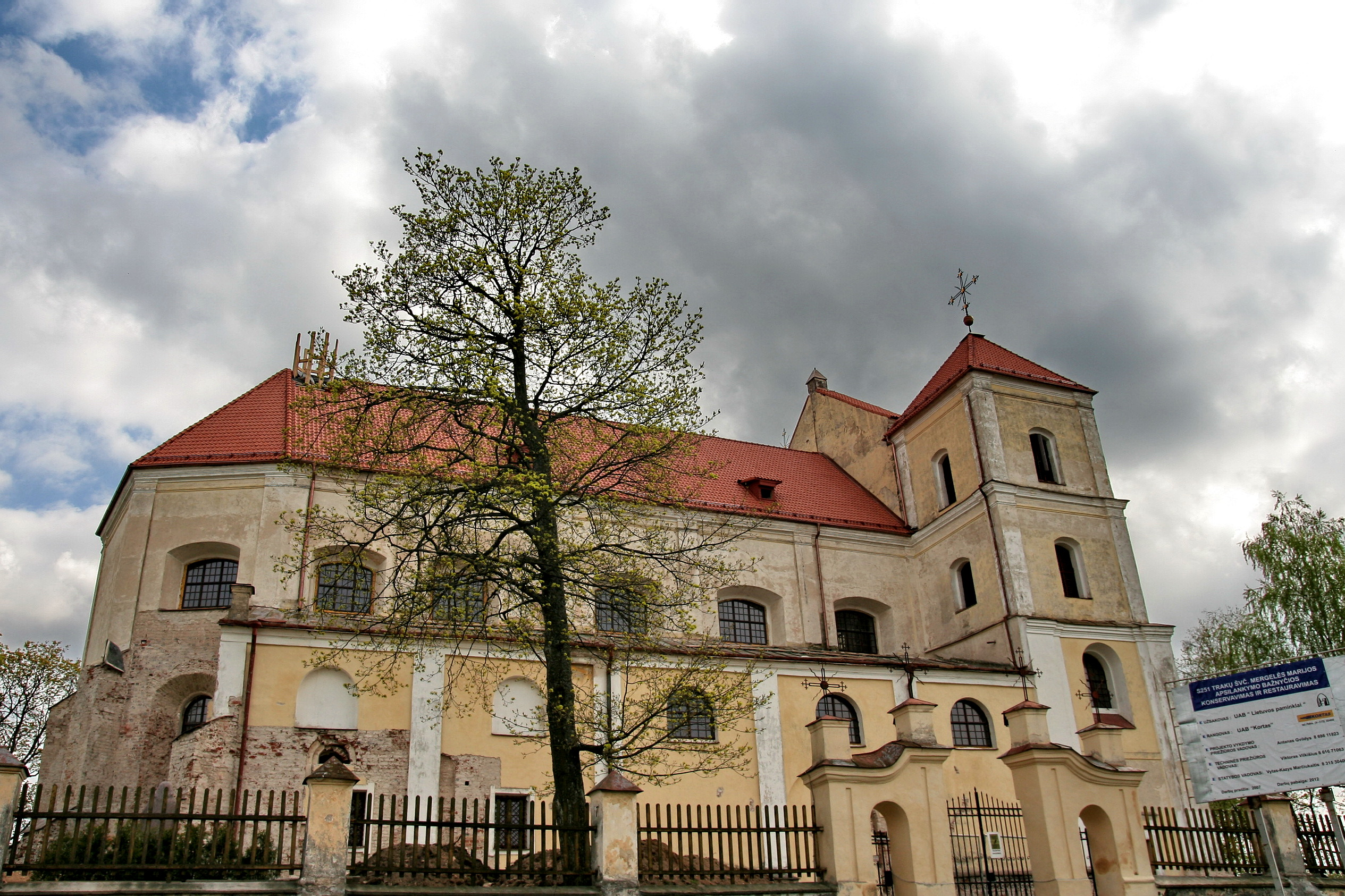
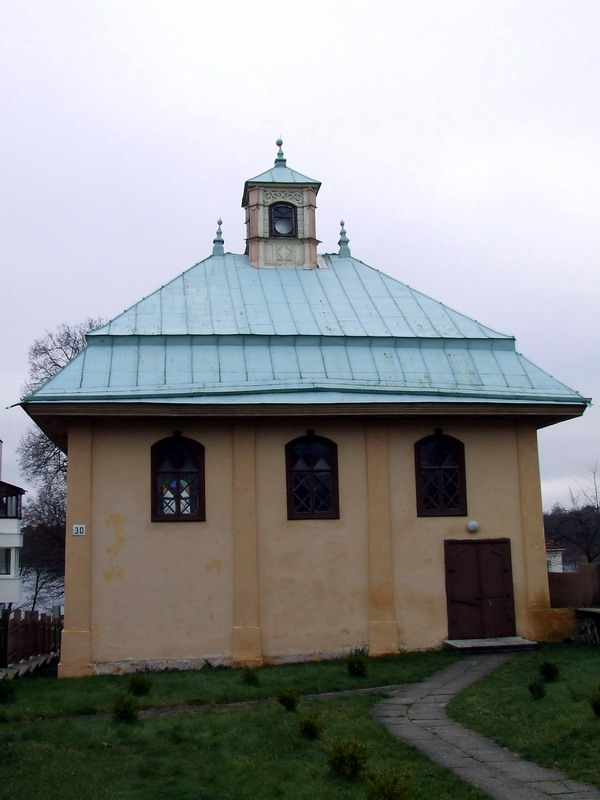
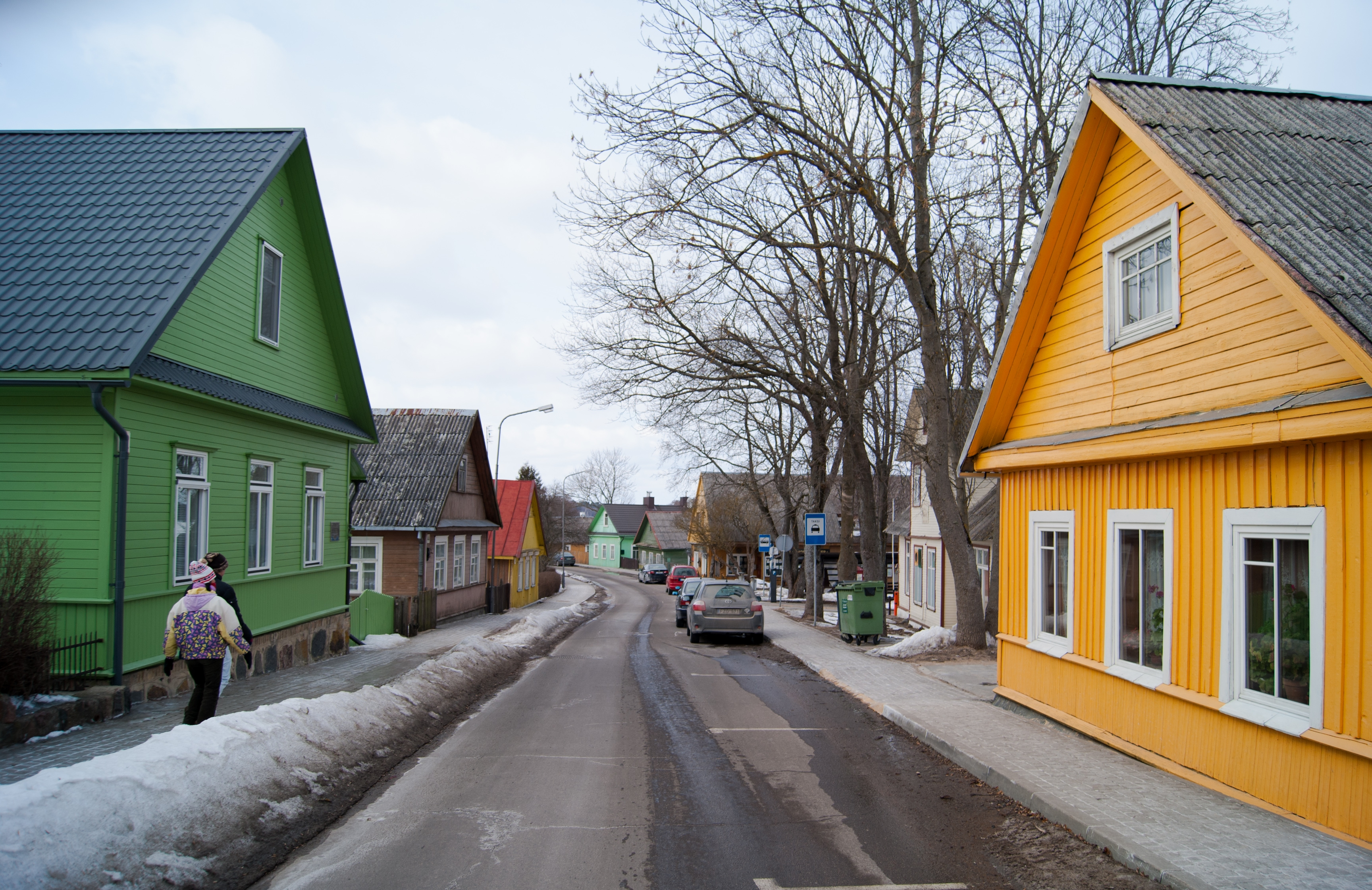
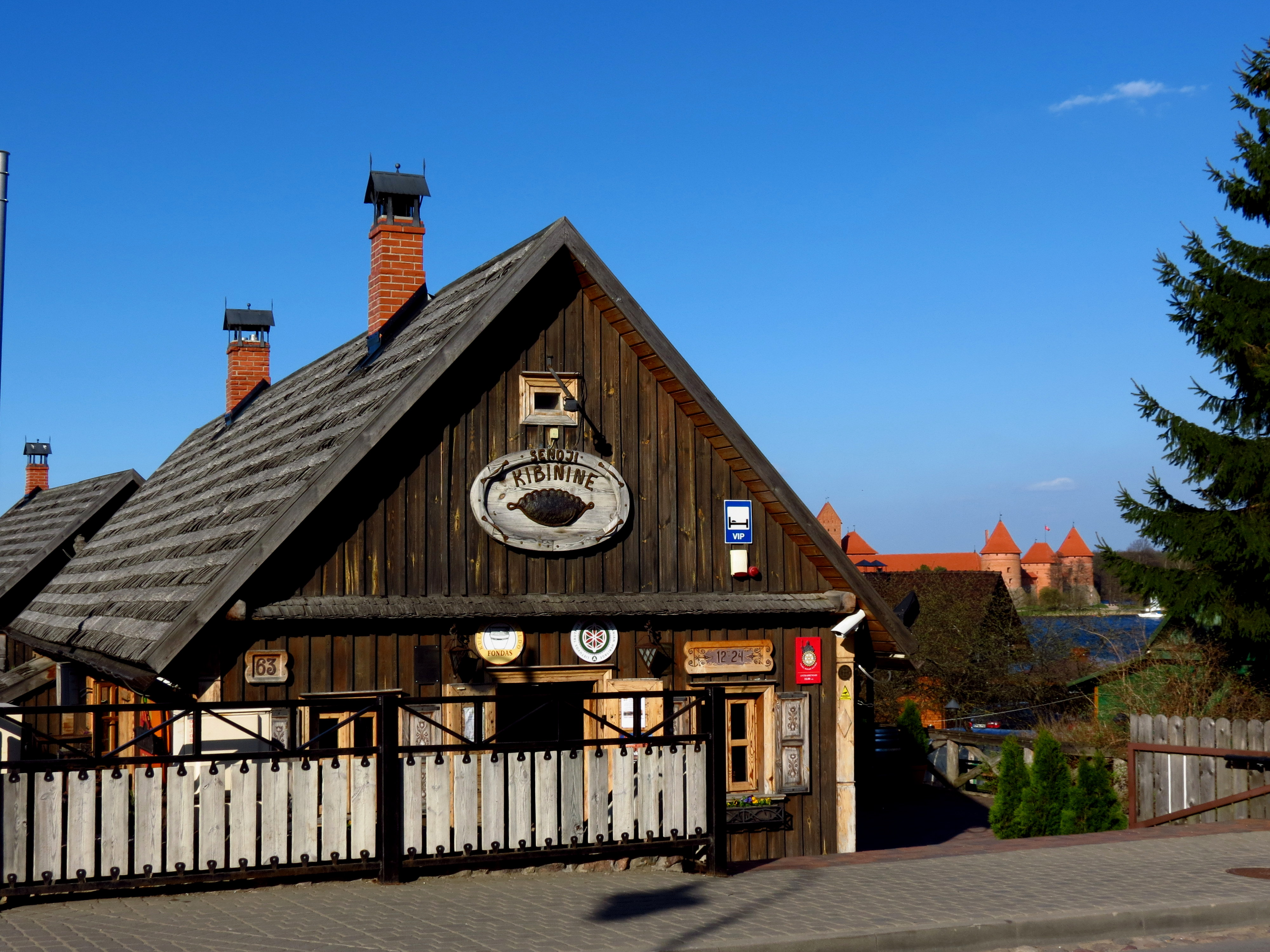
- Trakai Island Castle Trakai Peninsula Castle Lake Galvė Church of the Visitation of the Blessed Virgin Mary Trakai Kenesa Traditional wooden Tatar houses with three first-floor windows Traditional restaurant of Kibinai

- Flag Coat of arms

- Location of Trakai
- Coordinates: 54°38′0″N 24°56′0″E
- Country: Lithuania
- Ethnographic region: Dzūkija
- County: Vilnius County
- Municipality: Trakai district municipality
- Eldership: Trakai eldership
- Capital of: Trakai district municipality Trakai eldership
- First mentioned: 1337
- Granted town rights: 1409

Area
  - Total: 11.5 km^{2} (4.4 sq mi)

Population (2021)
  - Total: 5,426
- Time zone: UTC+2 (EET)
  - Summer (DST): UTC+3 (EEST)

Trakai (Trakai; Polish: Troki Polish: [ˈtrɔki]; see names section for alternative and historic names) is a city and lake resort in Lithuania. It lies 28 kilometres (17 miles) west of Vilnius, the capital of Lithuania or just 7 kilometres (4 miles) from the administrative limits of the Lithuanian capital city. Because of its proximity to Vilnius, Trakai is a popular tourist destination. Trakai is the administrative centre of Trakai district municipality. The city is inhabited by 5,357 people, according to 2007 estimates. A notable feature of Trakai is that the city was built and preserved by people of different nationalities. Historically, communities of Karaims, Tatars, Lithuanians, Russians, Jews and Poles lived here. Trakai was the medieval capital city of Lithuania.

Historically, the Trakai Island Castle, whose construction was finished by Grand Duke Vytautas, served as a residence of the Grand Dukes of Lithuania.

== Names and etymology ==
The name of the city was first recorded in chronicles from 1337 in German as Tracken (later also spelt Traken) and is derived from the Lithuanian word trakai (singular: trakas meaning "glade"). Since the time of the Polish–Lithuanian Commonwealth, the city has been known as Troki in Polish. Its other alternate names include Тро́кі (Tróki, historic)/Трака́й (Trakáj, modern Belarusian), Trok (Yiddish), Troky, and Traki. The name is the origin of the surname Trotsky (lit: of Traki), which Leon Trotsky would later adopt as a pseudonym to avoid profiling by the Russian Imperial Police, the Polish variant of the surname is Trocki.

== Demographics ==
The majority of Trakai's inhabitants (66.5%) in 2011 were Lithuanian, although the city also has a substantial Polish minority (19%), as well as Russians (8.87%).

According to the census of 2021, there were 5426 inhabitants in Trakai city: 3694 Lithuanians (68.1%), 1020 Poles (18.8%), 395 Russians (7.3%), 62 Belarusians (1.1%). There are other traditional minorities among Trakai inhabitants – Karaites, Tatars (also known as Lipka Tatars), Jews (also known as Litvaks), Russians Old Believers and others.

== Geography ==
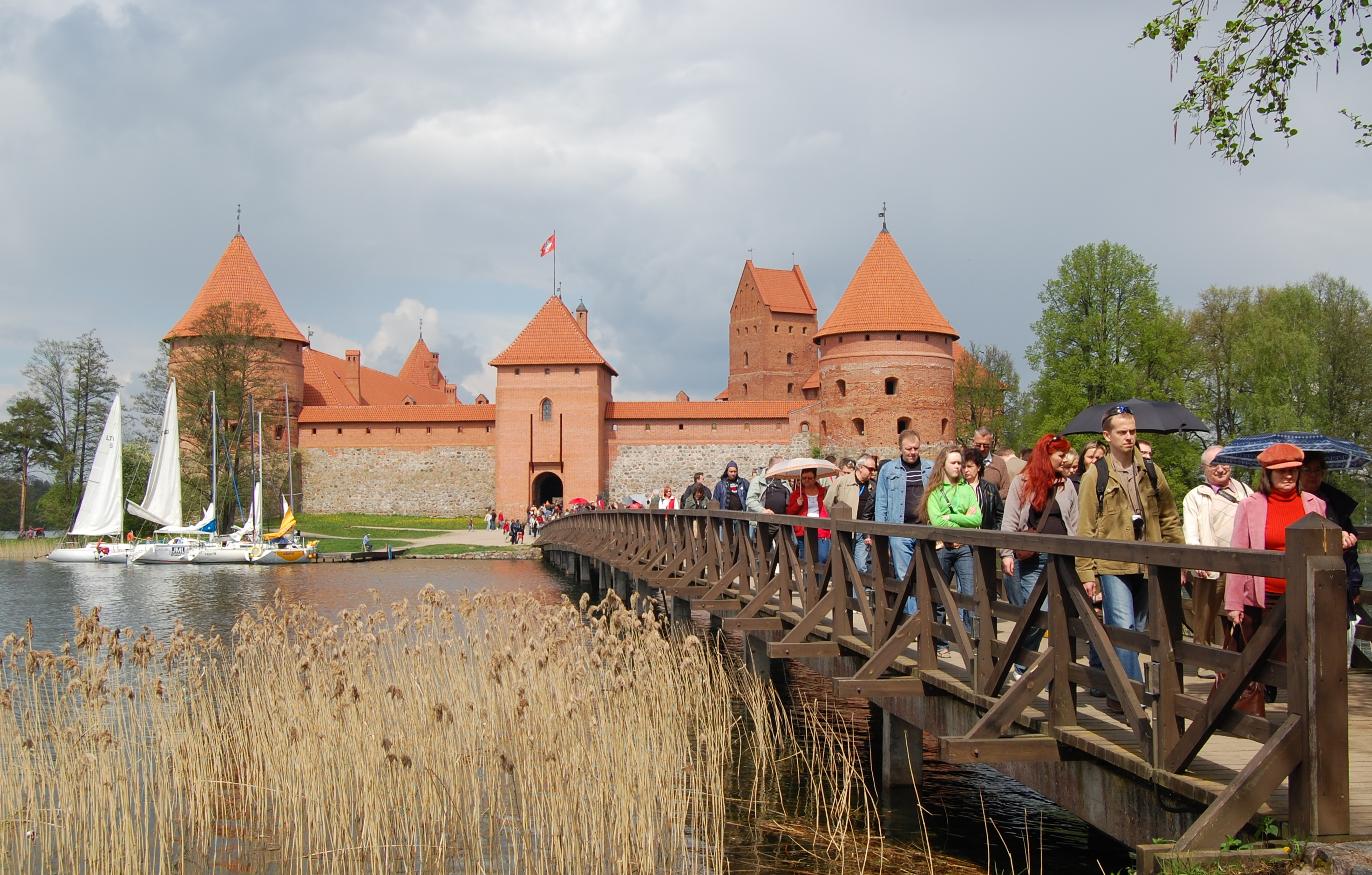
Trakai Island Castle

There are 200 lakes in the region, the deepest being Galvė with its 21 islands. Galvė covers an area of 3.88 km^{2}, Vilkokšnis lake – 3.37 km^{2}, the lake of Skaistis – 2.96 km^{2}. There are Trakai Historical National Park and Aukštadvaris Regional Park founded in the territory of the region.

Trakai Historical National Park was founded on 23 April 1991 to preserve Trakai as a centre of Lithuanian statehood as well as the park's authentic nature. The park covers 82 km^{2}, 34 km^{2} of which are covered by forests, and 130 km^{2} of which are covered by lakes.

Aukštadvaris Regional Park was founded in 1992 to preserve the valuable landscapes in the upper reaches of Verknė and Strėva. The area of the park is 153.5 km^{2}, most of which is covered by forests. There are 72 lakes here, the biggest of which is Vilkokšnis.

Trakai is a city built on water. The city is surrounded by the lakes of Luka (Bernardinai), Totoriškės, Galvė, Akmena, Gilušis. There are a number of architectural, cultural and historical monuments in Trakai. The history museum in the castle was established in 1962. Festivals and concerts take place in the island castle in summer.

== History ==
=== Beginnings ===
The first settlements in this area appeared as early as the first millennium A.D. The city, as well as its surroundings, started developing in the 13th century in the place of Senieji Trakai (Old Trakai). According to a legend after a successful hunting party, Grand Duke Gediminas discovered a beautiful lake-surrounded place not far from Kernavė, then capital of the Grand Duchy of Lithuania, and decided to build a castle in the location. This was how the Old Trakai Castle was built in Senieji Trakai. The name of Trakai was first mentioned in Teutonic Knights' chronicles in 1337. This year is considered to be the official date of city's foundation. When Grand Duke Gediminas finally settled in Vilnius, Senieji Trakai was inherited by his son Kęstutis. The Duchy of Trakai developed and the city entered its best decades.

=== Golden age ===
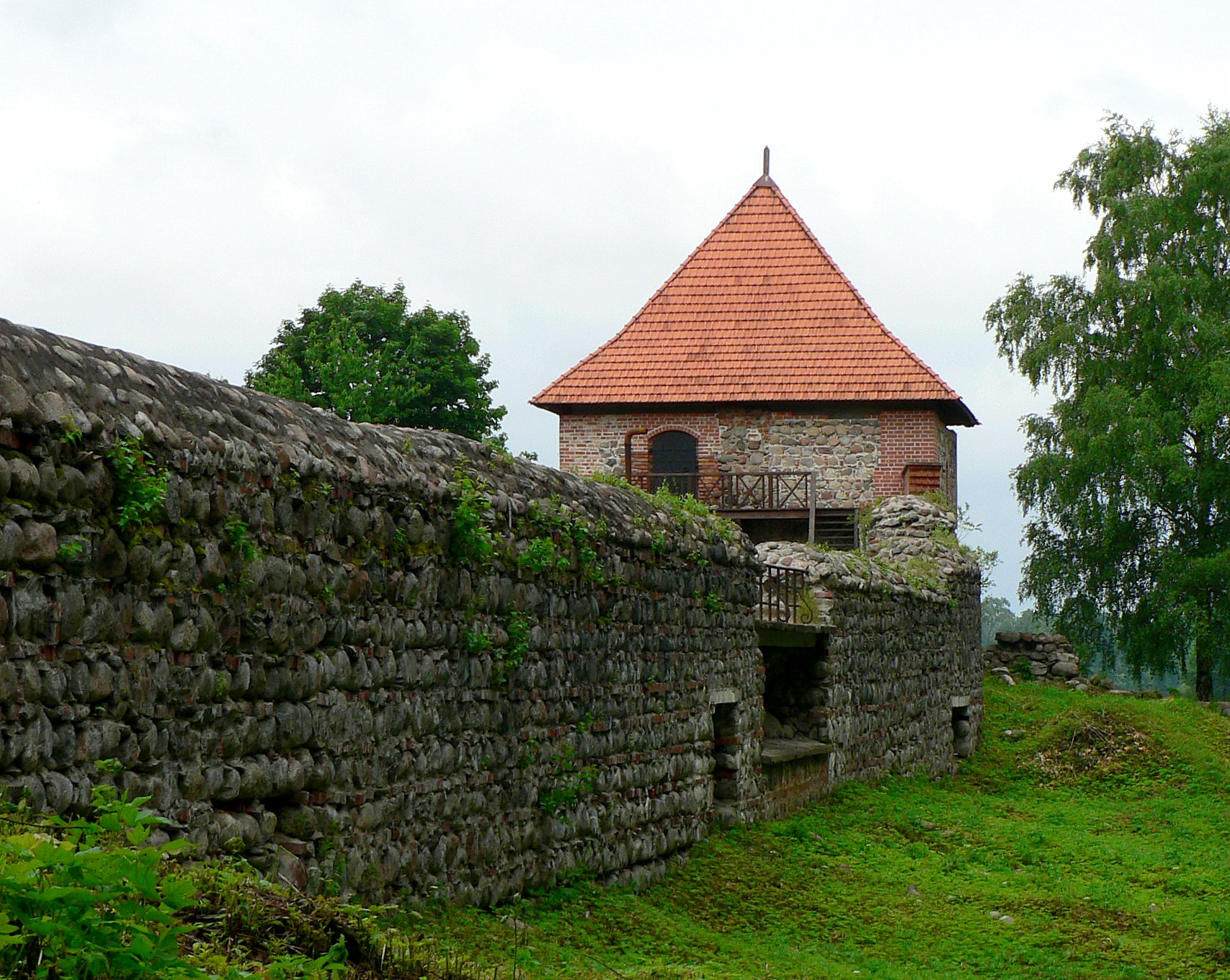
The old Trakai Peninsula Castle

Kęstutis moved the town from Senieji Trakai to its current location, which is sometimes known as Naujieji Trakai. The new location was a place of intensive construction: a new castle was built on the strait between lakes Galvė and Luka and known as the Peninsula Castle, and another one, known as the Island Castle, on an island in Lake Galvė. A village grew around the castles. The vicinity of Trakai was protected by Senieji Trakai, Strėva, Bražuolė, Daniliškės and other hillforts from attacks by the Teutonic Knights. Despite the protection, both wooden castles were successfully raided by the Teutonic Knights several times in a row.

The town was in the center of a conflict between Grand Duke Jogaila (later to become King of Poland) with his uncle Kęstutis. In 1382 Jogaila's and Kęstutis's armies met near Trakai, but Jogaila tricked Kęstutis and imprisoned him in Kreva. A few weeks later Kęstutis died in captivity and Jogaila transferred the castles to his brother Skirgaila, who became the governor of Lithuania Proper. However, his rule was briefly interrupted when in 1383 joint forces of Kęstutis's son Vytautas and the Teutonic Knights captured the town. In 1392, Vytautas and Jogaila signed the Astrava Agreement ending their quarrel. Vytautas became the Grand Duke of Lithuania while Jogaila technically remained his superior. Vytautas also regained his father's lands, including Trakai. Despite his official capital being in Vilnius, Vytautas spent more time in Trakai. In the early 15th century he replaced the older, wooden fortress with a stone castle. Some design elements were borrowed from the castles of the Teutonic Knights as Vytautas spent some time with the Teutons forming an alliance against Jogaila in earlier years.

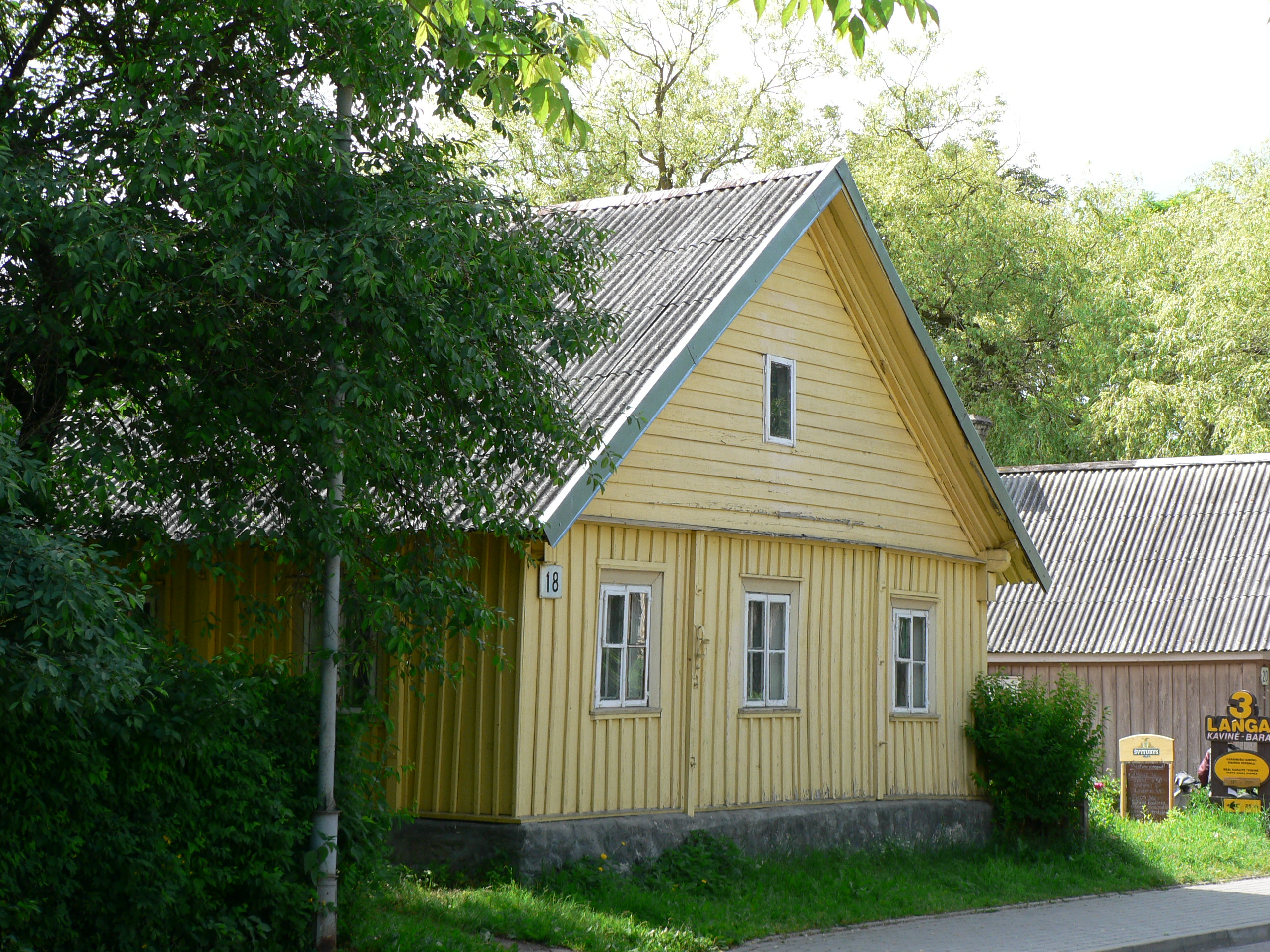
A typical triple-windowed wooden Karaim house in Trakai

Trakai became a political and an administrative centre of the Duchy, sometimes named the de facto capital of Lithuania. The construction of the brick castles was finished and a Catholic church was built. In 1409, the town was granted Magdeburg Rights; it is one of the first towns in Lithuania to get city rights. The village started rapidly developing into a town. Also in 1409 Grand Duke Vytautas the Great made Trakai the capital city of Lithuania and relocated the State Treasury of Lithuania and Lithuanian Metrica to Trakai. In 1413, it became a seat of the Trakai Voivodeship and a notable center of administration and commerce.

=== Decline and reconstruction ===
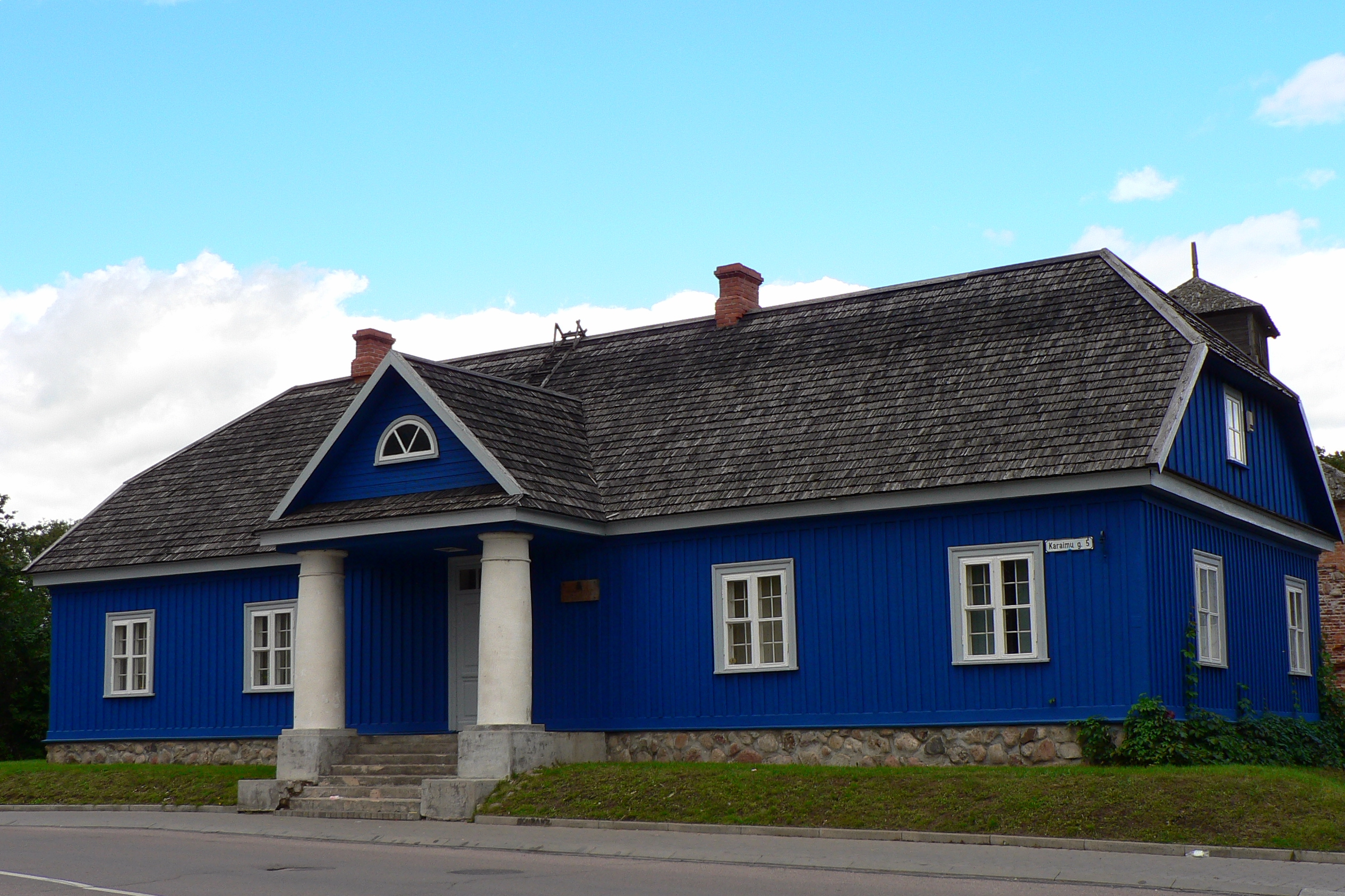
The old post office building

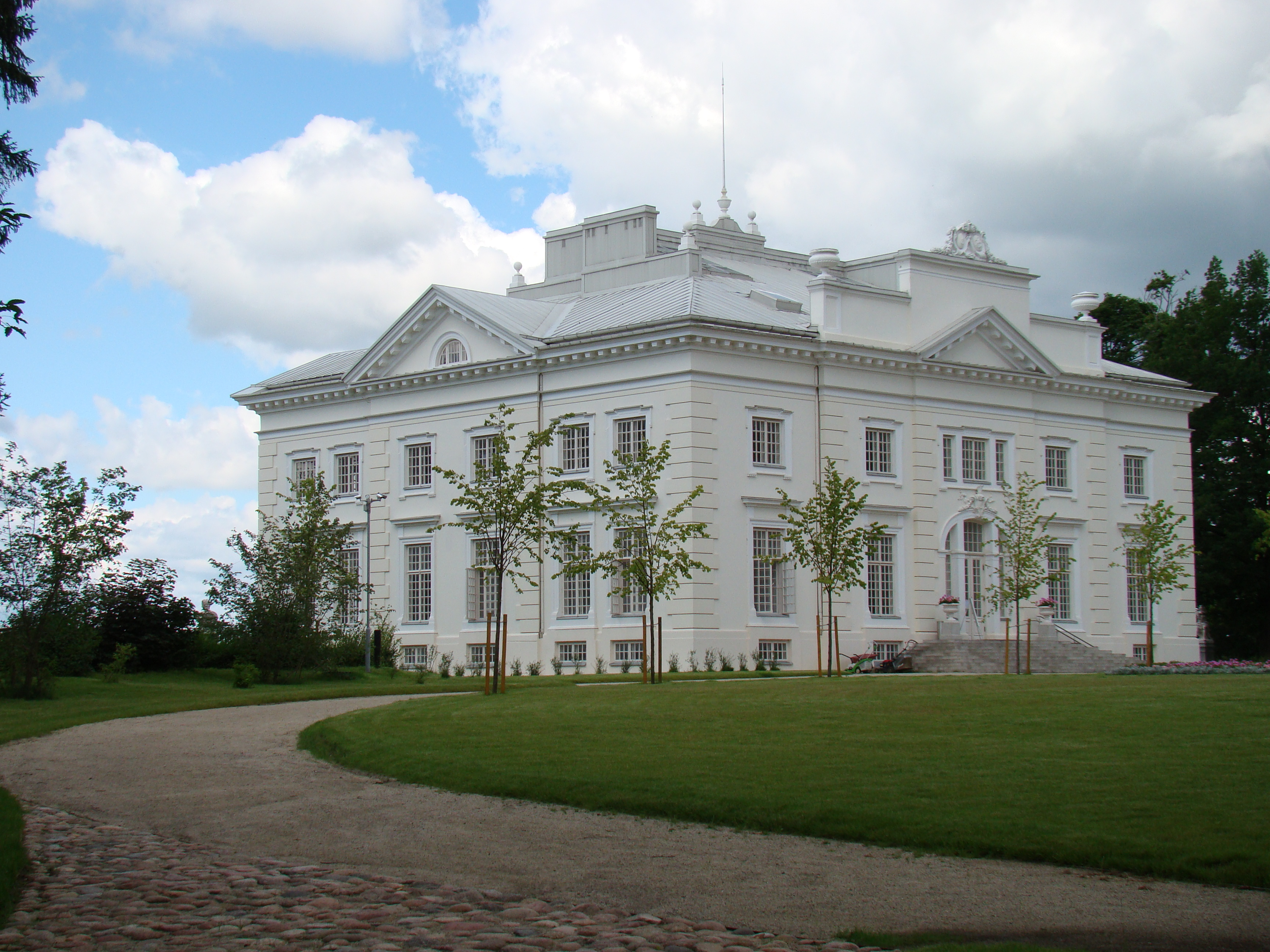
Užutrakis Manor, which previously belonged to the Tyszkiewicz family

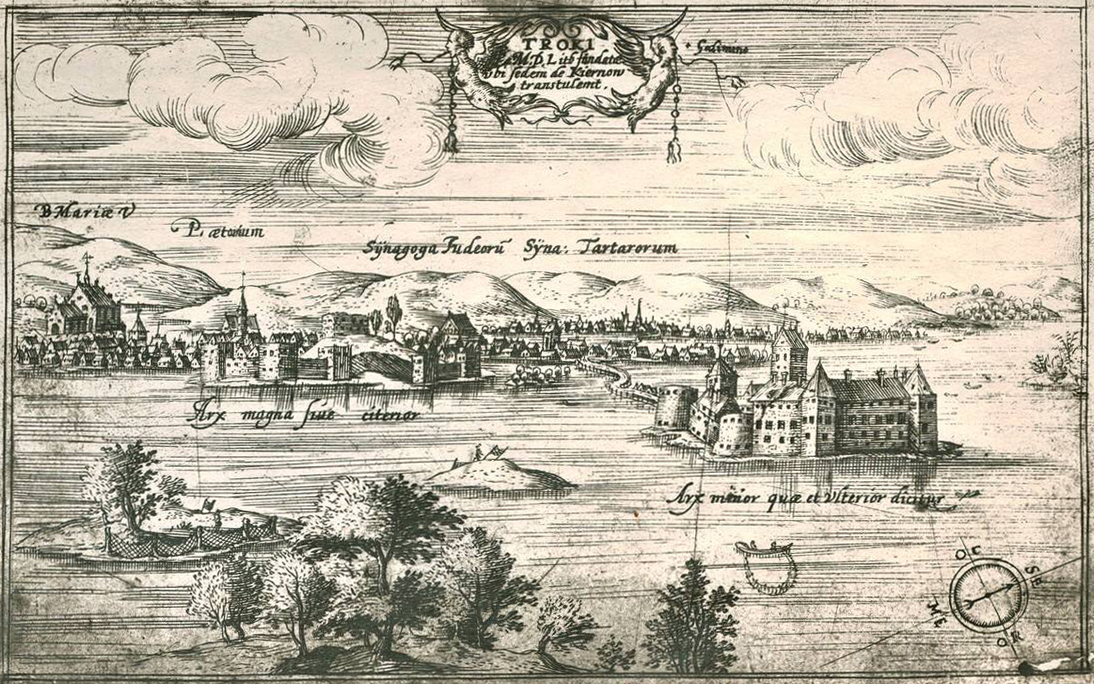
Panorama of Trakai, engraving by Tomasz Makowski (1600). The panorama shows the city's most important buildings, including the Tatar mosque.

After the Grand Duchy of Lithuania joined the Kingdom of Poland to form the Polish–Lithuanian Commonwealth in 1569, the castles remained a royal property, but the town's importance gradually declined, with the nearby Vilnius and the political center of the Commonwealth in Kraków becoming far more important. Nevertheless, it continued to be the seat of the local Sejmik. In Polish sources, the town name was started to be referred to as Troki. In 1477, the castle on the lake was a meeting place of King Casimir IV with Venetian envoys. After that, the castle became a luxurious prison for political prisoners. Sigismund I the Old imprisoned the members of Goštautai family, believed to be conspiring with Michael Glinski. Also Helena, widow of King Alexander was kept there in order to prevent her escape to the Grand Duchy of Moscow. The castle was refurbished by King Sigismund I the Old, who set up his summer residence there; however, after his death in 1548, the castle gradually fell into disrepair.

During the wars between Russia and Poland between 1654 and 1667, the town was plundered and burnt. In the aftermath of the war with the Tsardom of Russia in 1655, both castles were demolished and the town's prosperity ended. The castle ruins remained a historical landmark. During the Great Northern War (1700–1721) Trakai was plundered again, as famine and plague swept the country.

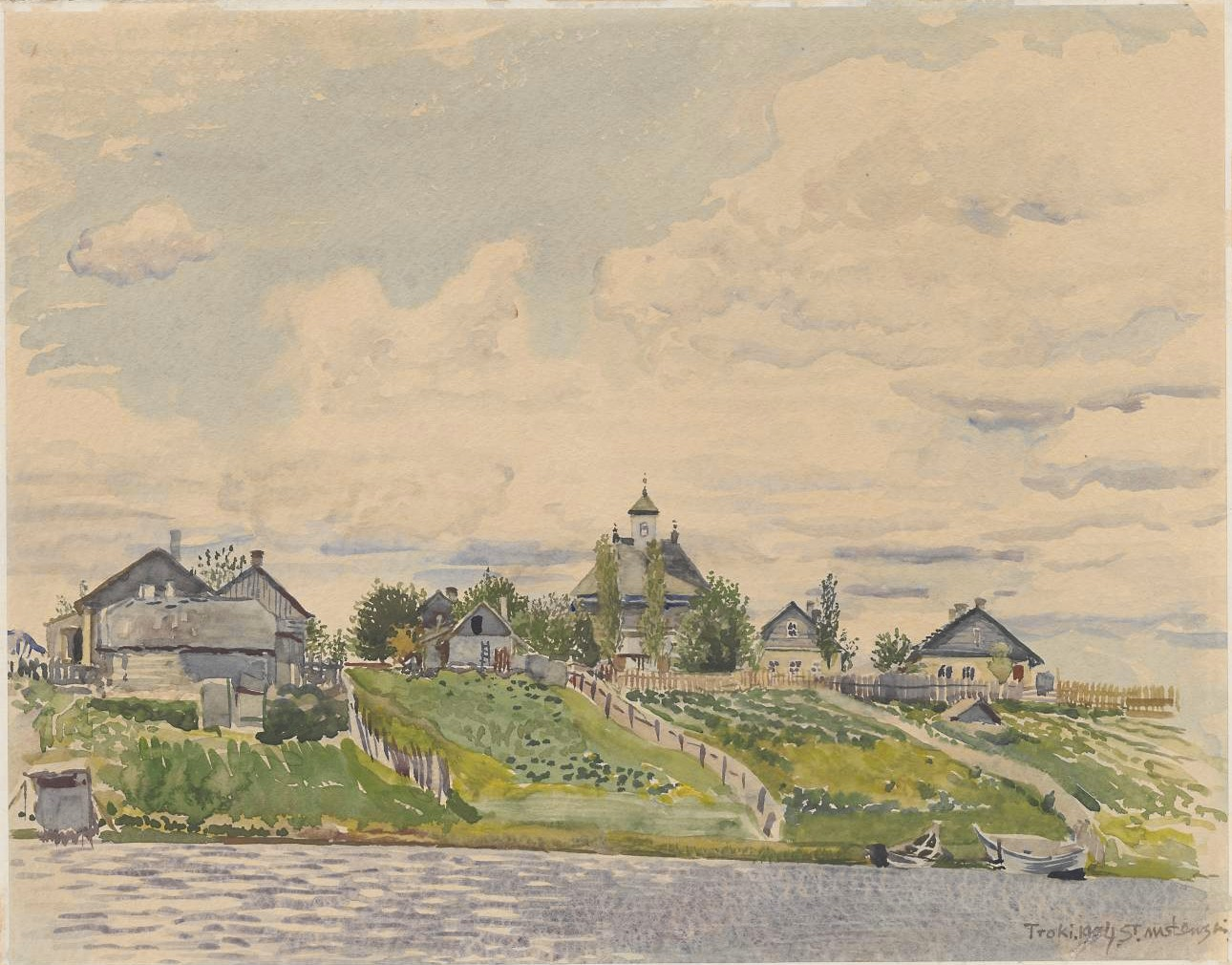
Troki - pejzaż - Landscape of Trakai (view of the Karaim bank), 1904, watercolor on paper by Stanisław Masłowski

After the Partitions of Poland in 1795, the area was annexed by the Russian Empire. After World War I, the area became part of the restored Republic of Poland. In 1929, the Polish authorities ordered reconstruction and restoration of the Trakai Island Castle. The works in the Upper castle were almost complete in 1939, when the Invasion of Poland started and the area was soon annexed by the Soviet Union, then by Nazi Germany during Operation Barbarossa. During the war, more than 5,000 Jews from the Trakai region were murdered by the Nazis. In 1944, during Operation Tempest, the town was liberated by joint forces of the underground Polish Home Army and Soviet partisans. After World War II it was again annexed by the Soviet Union and made part of the Lithuanian SSR in the Soviet Union; subsequently many of the city's and area's ethnic Polish inhabitants left for the recovered Territories of the Polish People's Republic.

In 1961, the reconstruction of the upper castle and a high tower construction were completed; however, the works came to a halt as a result of Nikita Khrushchev's speech of 21 December 1960, where the First Secretary declared that reconstruction of the castle would be a sign of glorification of Lithuania's feudal past. Restoration work in the lower castle were not resumed until the 1980s and were completed by Lithuanian authorities in the early 1990s. Today the Island Castle serves as the main tourist attraction, hosting various cultural events such as operas and concerts.

== Karaim community ==
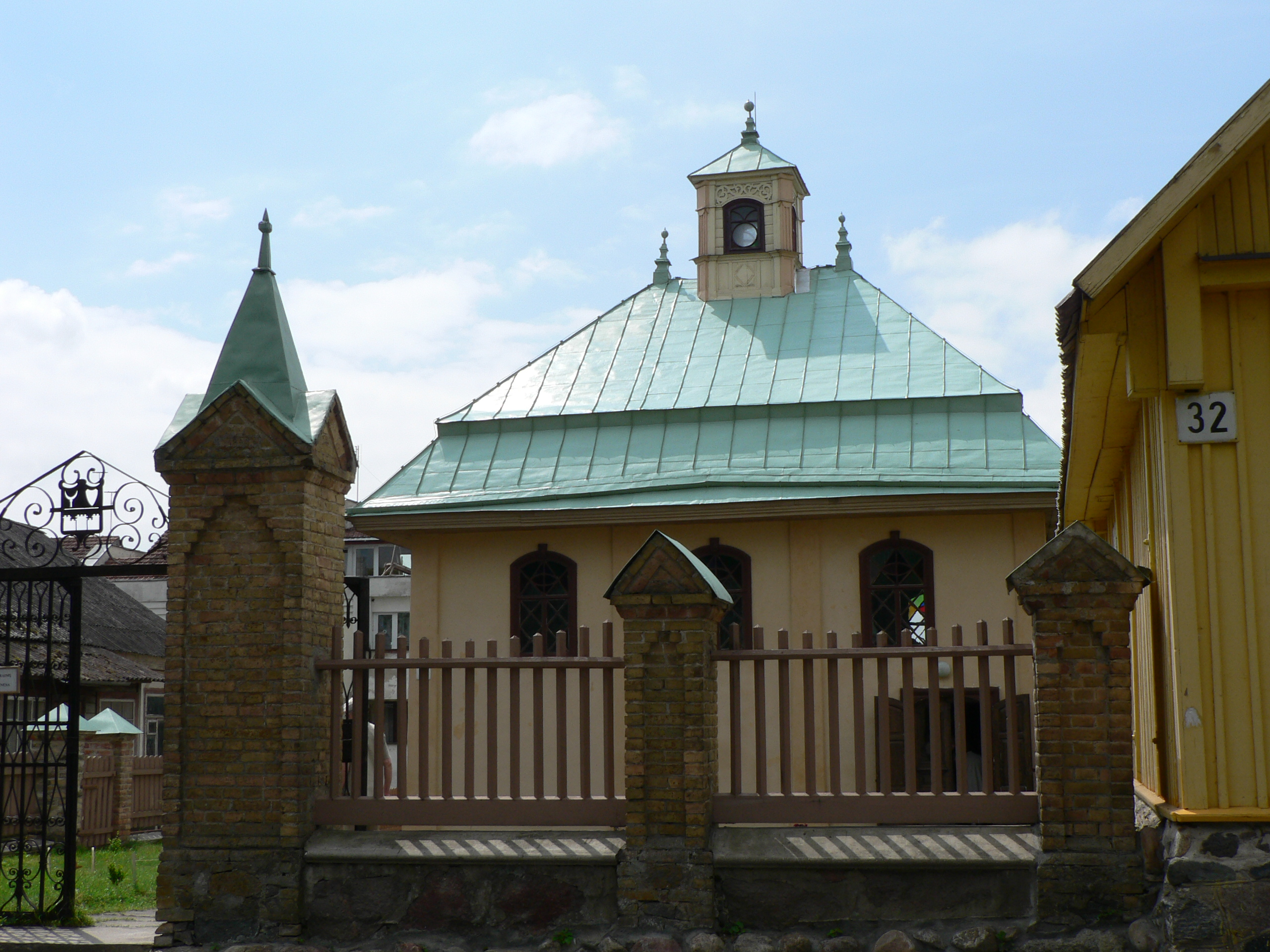
The Karaim kenesa

Karaim (or Karaites) are a small Turkic-speaking ethnic group resettled to Trakai by Grand Duke Vytautas in 1397 and 1398 from Crimea, after one of his successful military campaigns against the Golden Horde. Both Christian and Karaim communities were granted separate self-government in accordance with the Magdeburg rights. Despite ever-increasing Polonisation, Trakai remained a notable center of Karaim cultural and religious life. Scholars who were active in Trakai in the 16th and 17th centuries include Isaac of Troki (c. 1533 – c. 1594), Joseph ben Mordechai Malinowski, Zera ben Nathan of Trakai, Salomon ben Aharon of Trakai, Ezra ben Nissan (died in 1666) and Josiah ben Judah (died after 1658). Some of the Karaims became wealthy and noble.

The local Karaim community, which was the backbone of the town's economy, suffered severely during the Khmelnytsky Uprising and the massacres of 1648. By 1680, only 30 Karaim families were left in the town. Their traditions, including not accepting neophytes, prevented the community from regaining its strength. Early in the 18th century war, famine, and plague reduced the Karaims to three families. By 1765 the Karaim community had increased to 300. Trakai's Karaim kenesa is a rare example of a surviving wooden synagogue with an interior dome. Kibinai, which is the traditional Karaim pastry, became a local speciality and is mentioned in tourist guides.

== Twin towns – sister cities ==
Trakai is twinned with:

- Acre, Israel
- Alanya, Turkey
- Avola, Italy
- Giżycko, Poland
- Giżycko (rural gmina), Poland
- Ivano-Frankivsk, Ukraine
- Koszalin, Poland
- Lutsk, Ukraine
- Malbork, Poland
- (Georgia (country)) Mtskheta, Georgia
- Nowy Sącz, Poland
- Qazax, Azerbaijan
- Rheine, Germany
- Schönebeck, Germany
- Västra Götaland County, Sweden

== Notable people ==
- Isaac of Troki
- Vladimir Belsky (1866-1946), poet and librettist
- Edita Rudelienė (born 1978), Lithuanian politician
- Viktorija Senkutė (1996), Lithuanian rower, Olympic medallist.
