= Rūdiškės Eldership =

Eldership of Lithuania

The Rūdiškės Eldership (Lithuanian: Rūdiškių seniūnija) is an eldership of Lithuania, located in the Trakai District Municipality. In 2021 its population was 3308.
