= Kibinai =

Lithuanian pastries

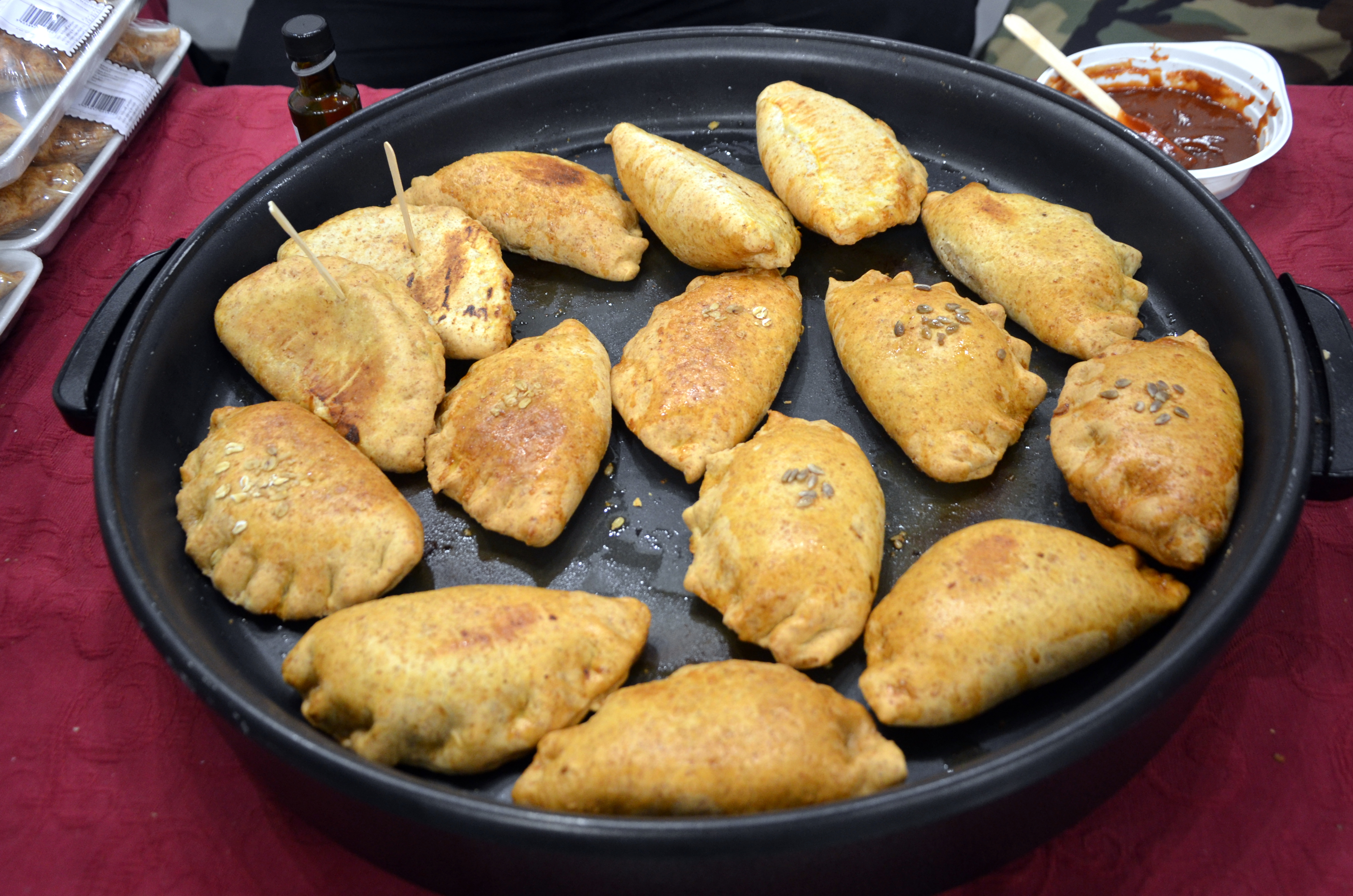
Kibinai

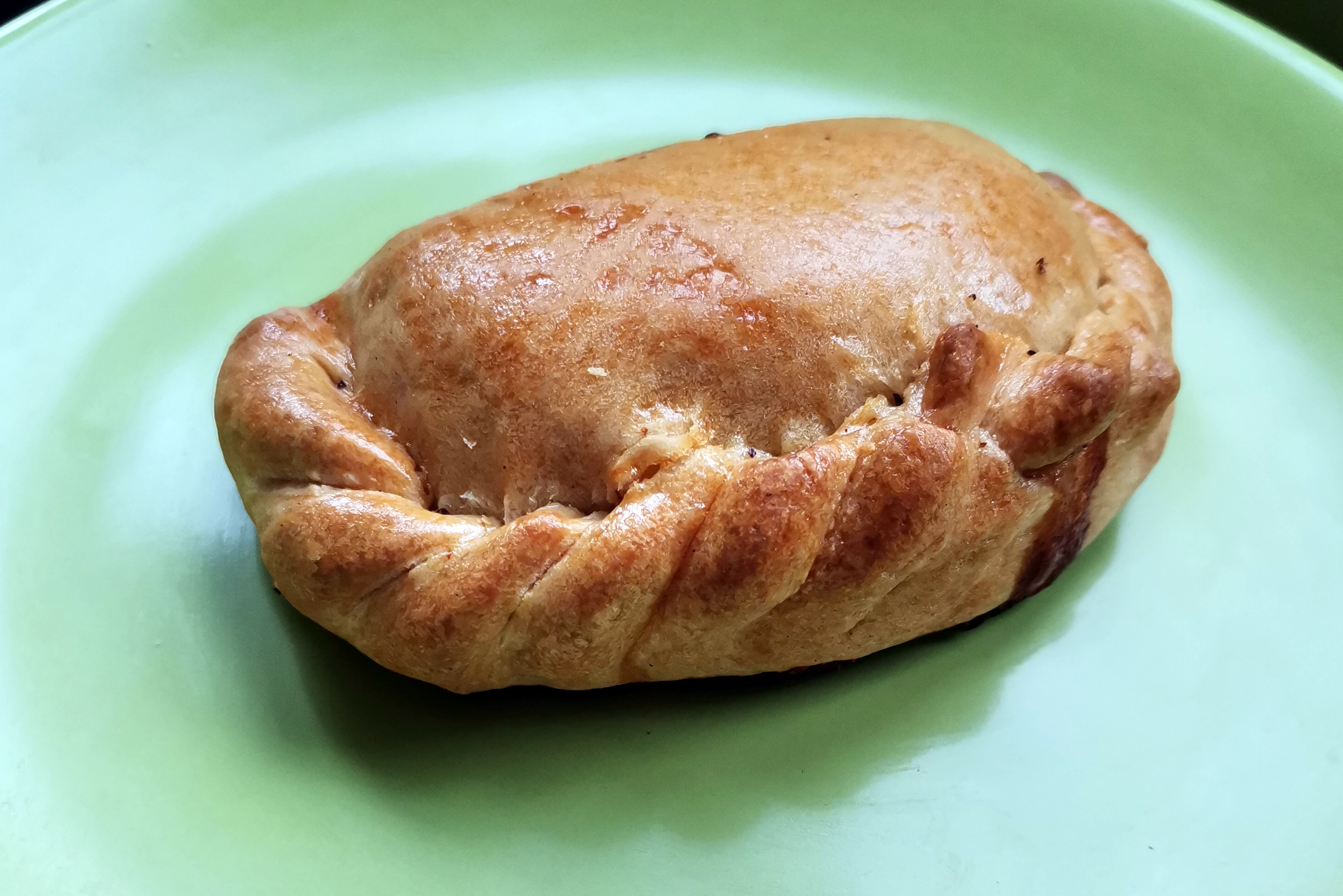
Et ayaklak from a bakery in Kyiv

Kibinai, kybyn, or kibin (plural in Karaim: kybynlar / qıbınlar (Common Turkic Latin); singular in Lithuanian: kibinas) are traditional pastries filled with mutton and onion, popular with the Karaite ethnic minority in Lithuania. As everything Karaite in Lithuania, they are mostly associated with the city of Trakai. English-language travel guides compare them to Cornish pasties.

Initially, they come from Crimea from where the Grand Duke of Lithuania Vytautas the Great took Tatar and Karaite families to become their guards in order to thank them for their help during his fight against the Golden Horde.

These meat pies are also made by the Karaite minority of Melitopol in Ukraine, where they are known as et ayaklak (Ukrainian: ет аяклак). The tradition of cooking them was inscribed on the National Register of Elements of the Intangible Cultural Heritage of Ukraine in 2018.

== See also ==
- List of stuffed dishes
- Empanada
- Chebureki
- Meat pie
- Turnover (food)
- Sambusak
- Samsa (food)
