= Paluknys Eldership =

Eldership of Lithuania

The Paluknys Eldership (Lithuanian: Paluknio seniūnija) is an eldership of Lithuania, located in the Trakai District Municipality. In 2021 its population was 1184.
