= Onuškis Eldership =

Eldership of Lithuania

The Onuškis Eldership (Lithuanian: Onuškio seniūnija) is an eldership of Lithuania, located in the Trakai District Municipality. In 2021 its population was 1438.
