= Senieji Trakai Eldership =

Eldership of Lithuania

The Senieji Trakai Eldership (Lithuanian: Senųjų Trakų seniūnija) is an eldership of Lithuania, located in the Trakai District Municipality. In 2021 its population was 2633.
