= Isaac of Troki =

Lithuanian Karaite theologian

Isaac ben Abraham of Troki, Karaite scholar and polemical writer (b. Trakai, Grand Duchy of Lithuania, c. 1533; d. Trakai, c. 1594 (or eight years earlier for both dates, according to Jacob Mann's hypothesis. Since the formation of the Polish–Lithuanian Commonwealth in 1569, still during Isaac ben Abraham's own lifetime, the city was also known in Polish as Troki).

== Works ==
Isaac's learning earned him the respect and deference of his fellow Karaites, and his knowledge of the Latin and Polish languages and of Christian dogmatics enabled him to engage in amicable conversations on religious subjects not only with Roman Catholic, Protestant, and Greek Orthodox clergymen, but also with Socinian and other sectarian elders. The fruit of these personal contacts, and of Isaac Troki's concurrent extensive reading in the New Testament and the Christian theological and anti-Jewish literature, was his famous apology of Judaism entitled Hizzuk Emunah (Hebrew חזוק אמונה, "The Strengthening of Faith"). Among his radical Christian sources, though Isaac considered them adversaries still, he made reference to the works of Belarusian "Psilanthropist" Symon Budny who was excommunicated from the Unitarian community for opposing prayer to Christ and denying the virgin birth. Though he himself did not live to complete the Hizzuk Emunah, his pupil, Joseph Malinovski Troki, completed it by adding the preface and an index that was compiled from Isaac's own written notes and oral remarks.

The work at once won extensive popularity both because of its powerful defense of the Jewish faith and because of its calm and reasonable emphasis of what he saw as vulnerable points in Christian tradition and dogmatics. It was studiously copied by interested Jewish readers, some of whom inevitably felt called upon to modify the work in the light of their own views and beliefs. A suggestion, made about 1629 by Zerah ben Nathan Troki to Manasseh ben Israel at Amsterdam, to print the work was rejected by that rabbi, intellectual, and printer. But one manuscript copy, modified and amplified by a Rabbinite copyist, came into the hands of the Hebraist Johann Christoph Wagenseil, who published it, with a Latin translation, under the sensational title of Tela ignea Satanae (The Fiery Darts of Satan; Altorf, 1681). Far from squelching Isaac's work, Wagenseil's violent refutation of it merely publicized it and gave rise to numerous debates and controversies in Christian circles, while Isaac's anti-Christian arguments were eventually taken over by the non-Jewish anti-clerical and liberal writers and philosophers of the 18th century. No less an expert in polemics than Monsieur de Voltaire characterized the Hizzuk Emunah as a masterpiece in the treatment of its subject.

Wagenseil's text of Hizzuk Emunah was reprinted for Jewish use at Amsterdam in 1705; a Yiddish translation appeared in the same place in 1717; an English translation by Moses Mocatta was printed for private circulation at London in 1851; a German translation, accompanied by a revised Hebrew text, was published by David Deutsch (2nd ed., Sohrau, 1873).

Two hymns by Isaac Troki are incorporated in the Karaite liturgy; he is also said to have composed works on Karaite ritual law.

== Sources ==
- Graetz, Heinrich, History of Jews, The Jewish Publication Society of America, Philadelphia, 1894, vol. IV.
- Ben-Sasson, H. H., (ed.), A History of the Jewish People, English translation, Cambridge, Massachusetts, 1976. ISBN 0-674-39731-2
- Nemoy, Leon, "Troki, Isaac ben Abraham," in Encyclopaedia Judaica, Second Edition, Farmington Hills, Michigan, 2007, vol. 20, pp. 155–156. ISBN 978-0-02-865948-0
