= Pretzien =

- Stadtteil of Schönebeck
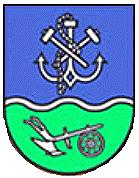
- Coat of arms
- Interactive map of Pretzien
- Location within Germany Location within Saxony-Anhalt
- Coordinates: 52°3′N 11°50′E
- Country: Germany
- State: Saxony-Anhalt
- District: Salzlandkreis
- Town: Schönebeck

Area
  - Total: 5.83 km^{2} (2.25 sq mi)
- Elevation: 53 m (174 ft)

Population (2006-12-31)
  - Total: 938
  - Density: 161/km^{2} (417/sq mi)
- Time zone: UTC+01:00 (CET)
  - Summer (DST): UTC+02:00 (CEST)
- Postal codes: 39245
- Dialling codes: 039200
- Vehicle registration: SBK

Pretzien is a village and a former municipality in the district of Salzlandkreis, in Saxony-Anhalt, Germany. Since 1 January 2009, it is part of the town Schönebeck.

In June 2004 there was a scandal after some newspapers reported, that some neo-nazis had burned the book The Diary of a Young Girl (by Anne Frank) at a public celebration of Solstice on 24 June. Pritzien Mayor Friedrich Harwig had supported the right winged club Heimat-Bund Ostelbien e.V., which had organized the celebration. The club had been founded by former members of the NPD.
