= Aukštadvaris Eldership =

The Aukštadvaris Eldership (Lithuanian: Aukštadvario seniūnija) is an eldership of Lithuania, located in the Trakai District Municipality. In 2021 its population was 1963.
