= Christoph Grabinski =

German footballer

Personal information
- Full name: Christoph Grabinski
- Date of birth: March 12, 1990 (age 36)
- Place of birth: Schönebeck, East Germany
- Height: 1.79 m (5 ft 10 1/2 in)
- Position: Defender

Team information
- Current team: Einheit Rudolstadt
- Number: 4

Youth career
- 1995–2008: 1. FC Magdeburg
- 2008–2009: FC Carl Zeiss Jena

Senior career*
| Years | Team | Apps | (Gls) |
| 2008–2012 | FC Carl Zeiss Jena II | 68 | (1) |
| 2012– | Einheit Rudolstadt | 82 | (2) |
- * Club domestic league appearances and goals

Christoph Grabinski (born 12 March 1990 in Schönebeck) is a German footballer, who currently plays for Einheit Rudolstadt.

== Career ==
He began his career 1. FC Magdeburg before 2008 moving to the youth from FC Carl Zeiss Jena, on 14 January 2009 was promoted to the first team.
