= Grendavė Eldership =

Eldership of Lithuania

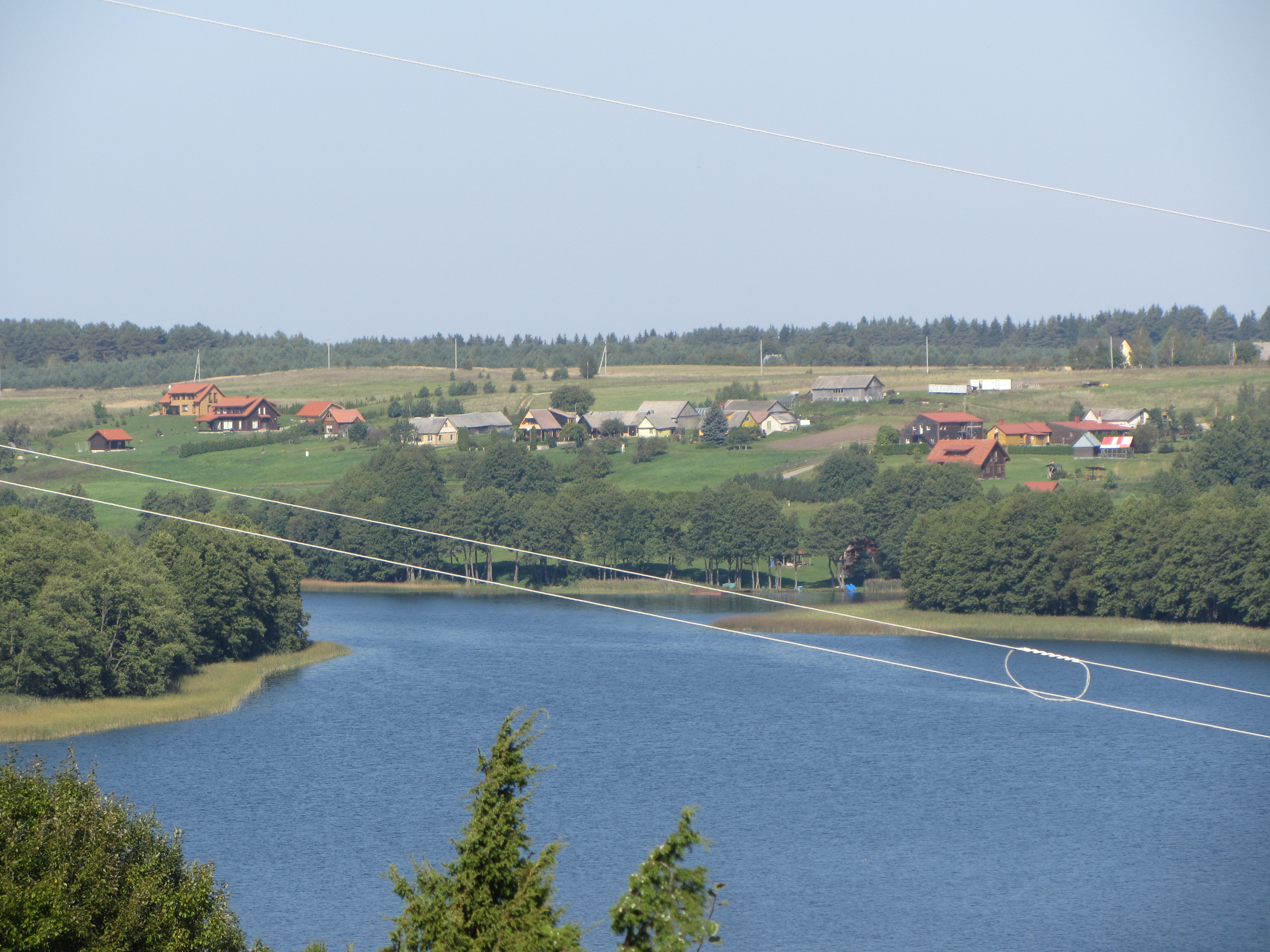

The Grendavė Eldership (Lithuanian: Grendavės seniūnija) is an eldership of Lithuania, located in the Trakai District Municipality. In 2021 its population was 504.
