= Reinickendorf 2 =

State electoral district of Germany

- Electoral district for the Berlin House of Representatives
- Reinickendorf 2 in 2026
- District: Reinickendorf
- Electorate: 28,783 (2026)

Current electoral district
- Party: CDU
- Member: Felix Schönebeck

Reinickendorf 2 is an electoral constituency (German: Wahlkreis) represented in the House of Representatives of Berlin. It elects one member via first-past-the-post voting.

== Geography ==
The constituency comprises Mächeritzwiesen, part of Reinickendorf West, part of Tegel-Süd, and part of Wittenau. It is entirely within the borough of Reinickendorf.

There were 28,783 eligible voters in 2026.

== Members ==
Election	Member	Party	%
1999	Andreas Gram	CDU	56.9
2001	Andreas Gram	CDU	42.1
2006	Andreas Gram	CDU	36.6
2011	Emine Demirbüken-Wegner	CDU	37.2
2016	Emine Demirbüken-Wegner	CDU	28.6
2021	Jörg Stroedter	SPD	26.7
2023	Emine Demirbüken-Wegner	CDU	38.9
2026	Felix Schönebeck	CDU	32.1

== Election results ==
=== 2026 election ===
State election (2026): Reinickendorf 2
Notes:	Blue background denotes the winner of the electorate vote. Pink background denotes a candidate elected from their party list. Yellow background denotes an electorate win by a list member, or other incumbent. A ✓ or ✗ denotes status of any incumbent, win or lose respectively.						
Party	Candidate	Votes	%	±%	Party votes	%	±%
CDU	Felix Schönebeck	5,986	32.1	▼6.8	4,285	22.8	▼15.3
AfD	Christopher Marcel Wiedenhaupt	3,865	20.7	▲7.5	4,278	22.7	▲9.8
Left	Jessica Gerke	3,277	17.6	▲12.5	3,608	19.2	▲13.8
SPD	Laurence Stroedter	2,601	13.9	▼8.9	2,610	13.9	▼6.6
Greens	Bogusz Schmidt	1,405	7.5	▼1.4	1,518	8.1	▼1.5
BSW	Serkan Önel	781	4.2		986	5.2	
FDP	Timo Bergemann	425	2.3	▼1.6	512	2.7	▼1.2
APT					504	2.7	▼0.3
Volt	Antonia Marx	308	1.7		282	1.5	▲0.9
PARTEI					121	0.6	▼0.5
PdF					47	0.2	
ÖDP					29	0.2	
du.					18	0.1	Steady
DKP					13	0.1	
SGP					10	0.1	Steady
Informal votes		430			257		
Total valid votes		18,648			28,821		
Turnout		19,078	66.3	▲11.4			
CDU hold	Majority	2,121	11.4	▼4.7			

=== 2023 repeat election ===
Changes denoted below for the 2023 election are compared to the 2016 election, as the 2021 election was declared invalid.

State election (2023): Reinickendorf 2
Notes:	Blue background denotes the winner of the electorate vote. Pink background denotes a candidate elected from their party list. Yellow background denotes an electorate win by a list member, or other incumbent. A ✓ or ✗ denotes status of any incumbent, win or lose respectively.						
Party	Candidate	Votes	%	±%	Party votes	%	±%
CDU	✓ Emine Demirbüken-Wegner	5,928	38.9	▲10.3	5,798	37.0	▲12.0
SPD	Jörg Stroedter	3,476	22.8	▼3.3	3,120	20.5	▼1.9
AfD	Rolf Weidenhaupt	2,018	13.2	▼7.3	1,979	13.0	▼6.2
Greens	Heiner von Marschall	1,369	9.0	▲0.3	1,454	9.5	▲1.0
Left	Dana Saky	772	5.1	▼1.3	824	5.4	▼1.2
APT	Belana Witt	594	3.9		461	3.0	▲0.7
FDP	Timo Bergemann	585	3.8	▼3.3	601	3.9	▼2.6
PARTEI	Vinko Schedlich	222	1.5		177	1.2	Steady
The Grays					119	0.8	
Team Todenhöfer					101	0.7	
Gray Panthers					98	0.6	▼2.7
Volt					87	0.6	
FW	Olaf König	159	1.0		56	0.4	
dieBasis	Pierre Kurzer	115	0.8		78	0.5	
Pirates					57	0.4	▼1.0
Verjüngungsforschung					36	0.2	▼0.2
Mieterpartei					33	0.2	
Humanists					27	0.2	
NPD					22	0.1	▼0.7
du.					21	0.1	
Bildet Berlin!					20	0.1	
ÖDP					20	0.1	
Klimaliste					17	0.1	
The Pinks/Alliance 21					10	0.1	
SGP					9	0.1	Steady
DKP					8	0.1	Steady
REP					6	0.0	
Bergpartei, die ÜberPartei					5	0.0	
BüSo					3	0.0	▼0.1
LKR					3	0.0	▼0.5
Informal votes		186			179		
Total valid votes		15,238			15,250		
Turnout		15,447	54.9	▼5.9			
CDU hold	Majority	2,452	16.1				

== See also ==
- Politics of Berlin
- House of Representatives of Berlin
