= Trotsky (surname) =

The surname Trotsky, Trotskiy, or Trotski Russian: Троцкий, feminine: Trotskaya is a toponymic surname derived from the Polish name Troki of the Lithuanian city of Trakai, literally meaning "of Troki" or "from Troki". Polish language equivalent: Trocki.

Notable people with the surname include:

- Leon Trotsky (1879–1940), Bolshevik revolutionary and Marxist theorist.
- Noi Trotsky (1895–1940), Soviet architect
- Ivan Trotski (born 1976), Belarusian race walker
- Natalia Ivanovna Trotsky, Russian revolutionary and author, the second wife of Leon Trotsky
