= Plötzky =

- Stadtteil of Schönebeck
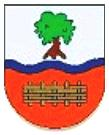
- Coat of arms
- Interactive map of Plötzky
- Location within Germany Location within Saxony-Anhalt
- Coordinates: 52°03′N 11°48′E
- Country: Germany
- State: Saxony-Anhalt
- District: Salzlandkreis
- Town: Schönebeck

Area
  - Total: 14.33 km^{2} (5.53 sq mi)
- Elevation: 55 m (180 ft)

Population (2006-12-31)
  - Total: 1,078
  - Density: 75.23/km^{2} (194.8/sq mi)
- Time zone: UTC+01:00 (CET)
  - Summer (DST): UTC+02:00 (CEST)
- Postal codes: 39217
- Dialling codes: 039200
- Vehicle registration: SLK
- Website: www.ploetzky.de

Plötzky is a village and a former municipality in the district of Salzlandkreis, in Saxony-Anhalt, Germany. Since 1 January 2009, it is part of the town Schönebeck.
