= Katharina Heise =

German sculptor and illustrator

Katharina Heise (3 May 1891, Bad Salzelmen – 5 October 1964, Halle) was a German sculptor and illustrator. She provided several woodcuts which were featured on the cover of Die Aktion. After 1917 she focussed more on sculpture.

Following the Nazi seizure of power, her art was declared degenerate. It was banned from museums and much of her public art was destroyed. he was also banned form taking part in exhibitions or taking on commissions. After her studio was destroyed by allied bombing, she returned to her parents home in Bad Salzelmen and continued to work in isolation. Immediately following the Second World War she created works commemorating the victims of fascism, including a bust of Anne Frank.
