= Trocki =

Trocki (feminine: Trocka) is a Polish-language toponymic surname derived from the Polish name Troki of the Lithuanian city of Trakai, literally meaning "of Troki" or "from Troki". Its Russified form is "Trotsky". Notable people with the surname include:

- Trocki family, a Polish noble family since 1710, of Łodzia coat of arms and Trocki coat of arms (ru:Троцкие)
- Carl A. Trocki, American historian, expert in Southeast Asia and China
- Robin Trocki, an actress in Glee
- Uriel Trocki (born 1996), Uruguayan-Israeli basketball player

== See also ==
- Trocka metro station
