= Ranies =

- Stadtteil of Schönebeck
- Interactive map of Ranies
- Location within Germany Location within Saxony-Anhalt
- Coordinates: 52°1′N 11°50′E
- Country: Germany
- State: Saxony-Anhalt
- District: Salzlandkreis
- Town: Schönebeck

Area
  - Total: 7.28 km^{2} (2.81 sq mi)
- Elevation: 48 m (157 ft)

Population (2006-12-31)
  - Total: 378
  - Density: 51.9/km^{2} (134/sq mi)
- Time zone: UTC+01:00 (CET)
  - Summer (DST): UTC+02:00 (CEST)
- Postal codes: 39221
- Dialling codes: 039200
- Vehicle registration: SLK

Ranies is a village and a former municipality in the district of Salzlandkreis, in Saxony-Anhalt, Germany. Since 1 January 2009, it is part of the town Schönebeck.
