= Trakai District Municipality =

Coordinates: 54°35′06″N 24°47′38″E

Trakai District Municipality Trakų rajono savivaldybė
- Municipality
- Coat of arms

- Location of Trakai district municipality

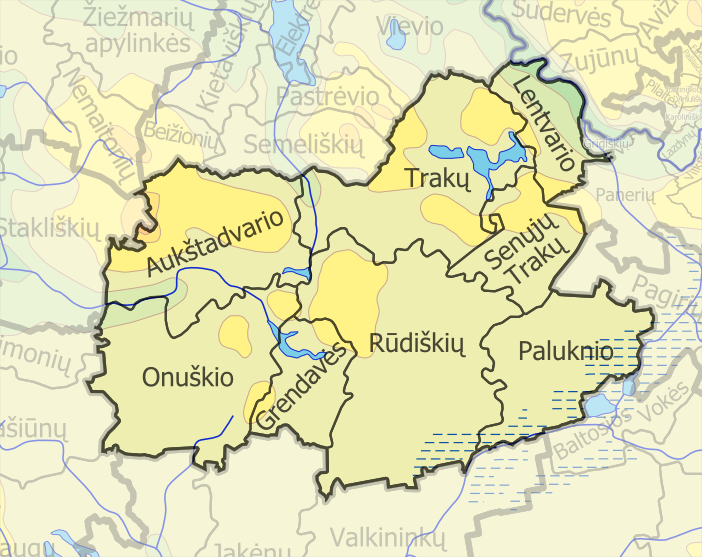
- Map of Trakai district municipality
- Country: Lithuania
- Ethnographic region: Dzūkija
- County: Vilnius County
- Capital: Trakai
- Elderships: List: Aukštadvaris; Grendavė; Lentvaris; Onuškis; Paluknys; Rūdiškės; Senieji Trakai; Trakai

Area
  - Total: 1,208 km^{2} (466 sq mi)

Population (2020)
  - Total: 32,546
  - Density: 26.94/km^{2} (69.78/sq mi)
- Time zone: UTC+2 (EET)
  - Summer (DST): UTC+3 (EEST)
- Major settlements: Lentvaris (pop. 9,618); Trakai (pop. 5,375)
- Website: www.trakai.lt

Trakai District Municipality is one of 60 municipalities in Lithuania.

It has significant Polish minority population in Lithuania, with more than quarter of the population claiming Polish ethnicity.

== Elderships ==
Trakai District Municipality is divided into 8 elderships:

Eldership	Area	Population (2021)	Population density (per km^{2})
Aukštadvaris	213 km^{2} (52,633.45 acres; 82.24 sq mi)	1,963	9
Grendavė	67 km^{2} (16,556.06 acres; 25.87 sq mi)	504	7
Lentvaris	49 km^{2} (12,108.16 acres; 18.92 sq mi)	12,812	260
Onuškis	250 km^{2} (61,776.35 acres; 96.53 sq mi)	1,438	6
Paluknys	140 km^{2} (34,594.75 acres; 54.05 sq mi)	1,184	8
Rūdiškės	250 km^{2} (61,776.35 acres; 96.53 sq mi)	3,308	13
Senieji Trakai	98 km^{2} (24,216.33 acres; 37.84 sq mi)	2,633	27
Trakai	142 km^{2} (35,088.96 acres; 54.83 sq mi)	8,200	58

== History ==
The Trakai district became significant early in its history due to the Old Trakai Castle built by the Grand Duke Gediminas in the 13th century. Many other castles were built in the area soon after this one, including the Trakai Peninsula Castle and the Trakai Island Castle. For many years, it has been distinguished from much of the rest of Lithuania in having other ethnic groups such as Karaims, Tatars, Russians and Poles living in the vicinity.

== Settlements ==
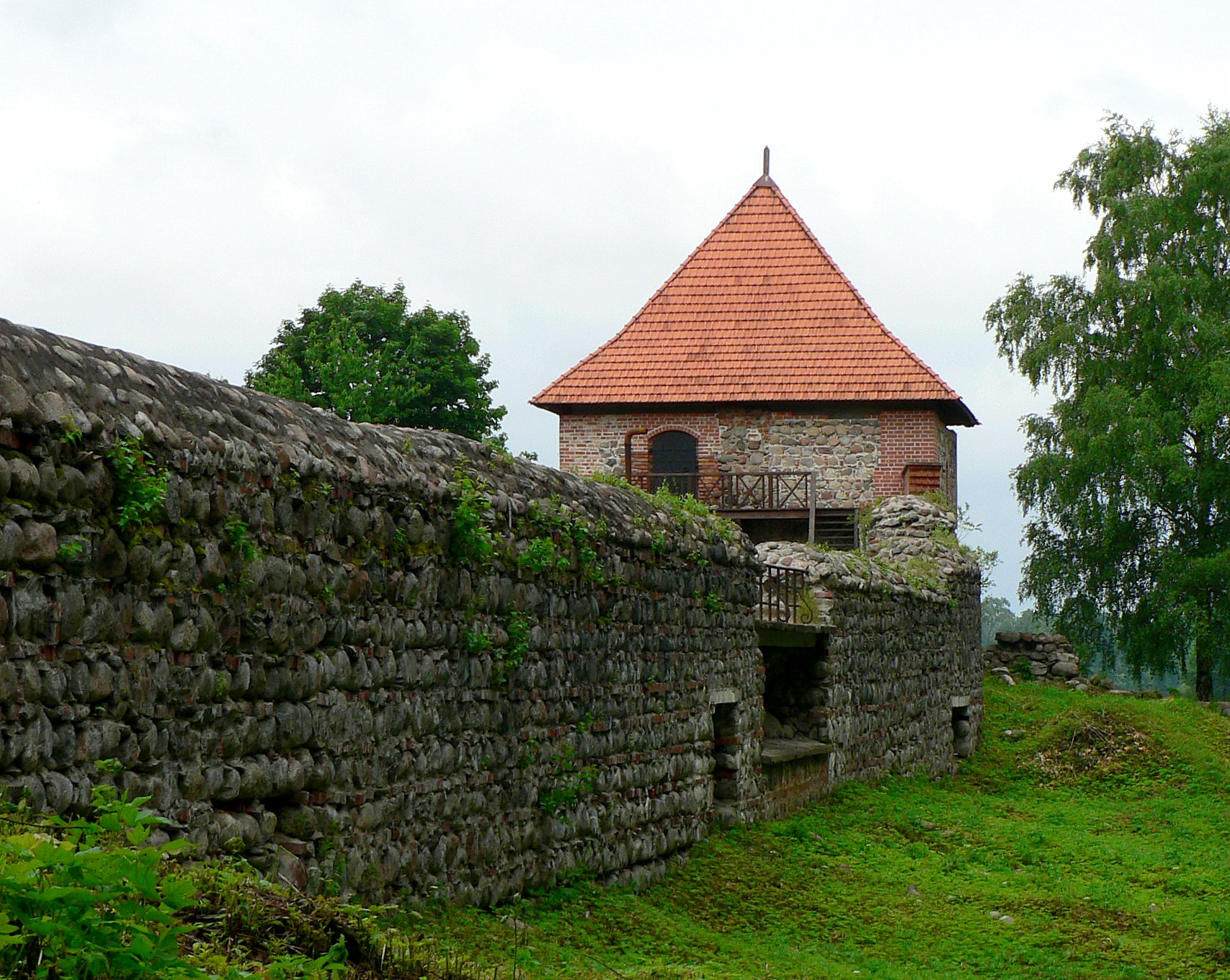
Trakai Peninsula castle

Trakai was an area holding great significance in the Grand Duchy of Lithuania. The Trakai region began to decline politically and economically in the 16th century. During the wars with Russia, Trakai was continually attacked and razed. It has been rebuilt and many celebrations are held there annually once again. The city is often portrayed on Lithuanian stamps because of its beauty and illustrious history. It has become an important district in Lithuania once again.

The biggest city in the district is Lentvaris, not Trakai, its capital. Other settlements include Paluknys, Trakų Vokė, Dusmenys, and Rūdiškės. It borders the Vilnius city municipality in the east.
