= Felix Schönebeck =

German politician (born 1989)

Member of the Berlin House of Representatives
- Assuming office 29 October 2026
- Succeeding: Emine Demirbüken-Wegner
- Constituency: Reinickendorf 2

Personal details
- Born: 1989 (age 36–37)
- Party: Christian Democratic Union

Felix Schönebeck (born 1989) is a German politician who was elected member of the Berlin House of Representatives in 2026. He has served as chairman of the Christian Democratic Union in Tegel since 2021.
