= Districts of Germany =

Part of the geopolitical division of Germany

Districts of Germany Kreise (German)
- Landkreise Stadtkreise and Stadtstaaten
- Location: Germany
- Found in: States
- Possible types: Landkreis; Stadtkreis
- Government: Kreistag
- Subdivisions: Municipality

In 13 German states, (Note: All, except for the three city states) the primary administrative subdivision higher than a Gemeinde (municipality) is the Landkreis (Note: official term in all states, except North Rhine-Westphalia and Schleswig-Holstein) (German pronunciation: [ˈlantˌkʁaɪs]) or Kreis (Note: official term in the states of North Rhine-Westphalia and Schleswig-Holstein) (Note: In either case, the plural of the noun is formed by suffixing it with "e". In Germany, the term Kreis is also used informally for any rural district, and (for example in statistical summaries) for a district of any type.) ([kʁaɪs]). Most major cities in Germany are not part of any Kreis, but instead combine the functions of a municipality and a Kreis; such a city is referred to as a kreisfreie Stadt (Note: literally "district-free city"; official term in all states, except Baden-Württemberg) ([ˈkʁaɪsfʁaɪə ˈʃtat]) or Stadtkreis (Note: literally "urban district"; official term in Baden-Württemberg) ([ˈʃtatˌkʁaɪs]).

(Land-)Kreise stand at an intermediate level of administration between each state (Länder) and the municipalities (Gemeinden) within it. (Note: A Kreis is not to be confused with a Regierungsbezirk. These are state administrative subdivision above Landkreis-level and below state-level. Currently only four states make use of this administrational level: North Rhine-Westphalia, Bavaria, Baden-Württemberg and Hesse.) These correspond to level-3 administrative units in the Nomenclature of Territorial Units for Statistics (NUTS 3).

Previously, the similar title Imperial Circle (Reichskreis) referred to groups of states in the Holy Roman Empire. The related term Landeskommissariat was used for similar administrative divisions in some German territories until the 19th century.

== Types of districts ==
Administrative divisions of Germany (clickable image)

The majority of German districts are "rural districts" (German: Landkreise, pronounced [ˈlantˌkʁaɪ̯zə]), of which there are 294 as of 2017. Cities with more than 100,000 inhabitants (and smaller towns in some states) do not usually belong to a district, but take on district responsibilities themselves, similar to the concept of independent cities. These are known as "urban districts" (German: kreisfreie Städte or Stadtkreise)—cities which constitute a district in their own right—and there are 106 of them, bringing the total number of districts to 400.

In North Rhine-Westphalia, there are some cities with more than 100,000 inhabitants which are not urban districts, these being Recklinghausen, Gütersloh, Siegen, Paderborn, Bergisch Gladbach, Neuss and Moers. Nevertheless, these cities take over many district responsibilities themselves, although they are still part of a larger rural district. Midsize towns can perform particular administrative functions of the district as well, especially to provide common services to the local citizens. The classification as "midsize" town is usually based on a town's registered population, but varies from state to state.

A special type of rural districts includes the three Kommunalverbände besonderer Art (Municipal unions of special kind), a fusion of a district-free town with its adjacent rural district: besides the Regionalverband Saarbrücken (Saarbrücken regional association), from 1974 until 2007 called "Stadtverband Saarbrücken" (Saarbrücken town association), there is the Hanover Region since 2001 and the Städteregion Aachen (Aachen region of towns) since 2009. Aachen, Hanover and Göttingen retain certain rights of an urban district (Kreisfreie Stadt); Saarbrücken has not explicitly determined a similar provision in its legislation.

== Responsibilities ==
According to common federal and state laws, the districts are responsible for the following tasks:

- Planning local public transport (in most states)
- The building and upkeep of "district roads" (German: Kreisstraßen)
- Other building plans which cover more than one local authority's area
- Caring for national parks
- Social welfare
- Youth welfare
- The building and upkeep of hospitals
- The building and upkeep of state schools of secondary education
- Household waste collection and disposal
- Car registration
- Electing the Landrat or Landrätin, the chief executive and representative of the district

Districts can perform additional functions, based on varying local laws in each region:

- Financial support for culture
- The building of pedestrian zones and bicycle lanes
- Financial support for school exchanges
- The building and upkeep of public libraries
- Revitalisation of the economy
- Encouraging tourism
- The management of state-run adult education colleges (German: Volkshochschulen)

All these tasks are carried out by local (municipal) authorities operating together. Urban districts have these responsibilities and also those of the municipalities.

== District council ==
The district council (German: Kreistag, pronounced [ˈkʁaɪ̯sˌtaːk]) is the highest institution of a rural district and is responsible for all fundamental guidelines of regional self-administration. This council is elected directly every five years, except in Bavaria where it is elected every six years. Usually the administrative seat of a rural district is located in one of its largest towns. However, district council and administrative seat of some rural districts are not situated within the district proper, but in an adjacent district-free city. Most of those rural districts are named after this central city as well (e.g. Bamberg and Karlsruhe). Moers is the biggest city in Germany (and at present time the only one with more than 100,000 inhabitants) that is neither an urban district, nor the district seat of its rural district.

== District administration ==
The highest administrative position of a rural district is an officer known as Landrat or Landrätin, who is responsible for the district's day-to-day administration and acts as its representative for official purposes. In parts of northern Germany, Landrat is also the name of the entire district administration, which in southern Germany is known as Kreisverwaltung or Landratsamt.

In urban districts similar administrative functions are performed by a mayor, in most greater cities usually by an Oberbürgermeister, which is sometimes translated as lord mayor.

Rural districts in some German states have an additional administrative committee called Kreisausschuss. This committee is generally led by the Landrat and includes a number of additional voluntary members. It takes over certain administrative functions for the district, following decisions of the district council. However, the exact role and regulations of this panel vary greatly between different states.

The city where the office of the district's administration is located is called Kreisstadt ("district city"), or Kreishauptort ("district main community") if it is not a city. Often the district is named after its district city.

Linguistically, any city within a district could be called a "Kreisstadt", especially those that aren't district-free to distinguish them from district-free cities. This term has to be distinguished from the legal term "Kreisstadt" that only denotes the location of the administrative office. In everyday language, district cities are also called Kreishauptstadt ("district capital").

== See also ==
- Electoral Circle (German: Kurkreis)
- List of districts of Germany
- States of Germany
- List of rural districts with populations and area in km^{2} (in German)
- List of urban districts with populations and area in km^{2} (in German)
