= Užutrakis Manor =

- Užutrakio dvaras (Lithuanian)
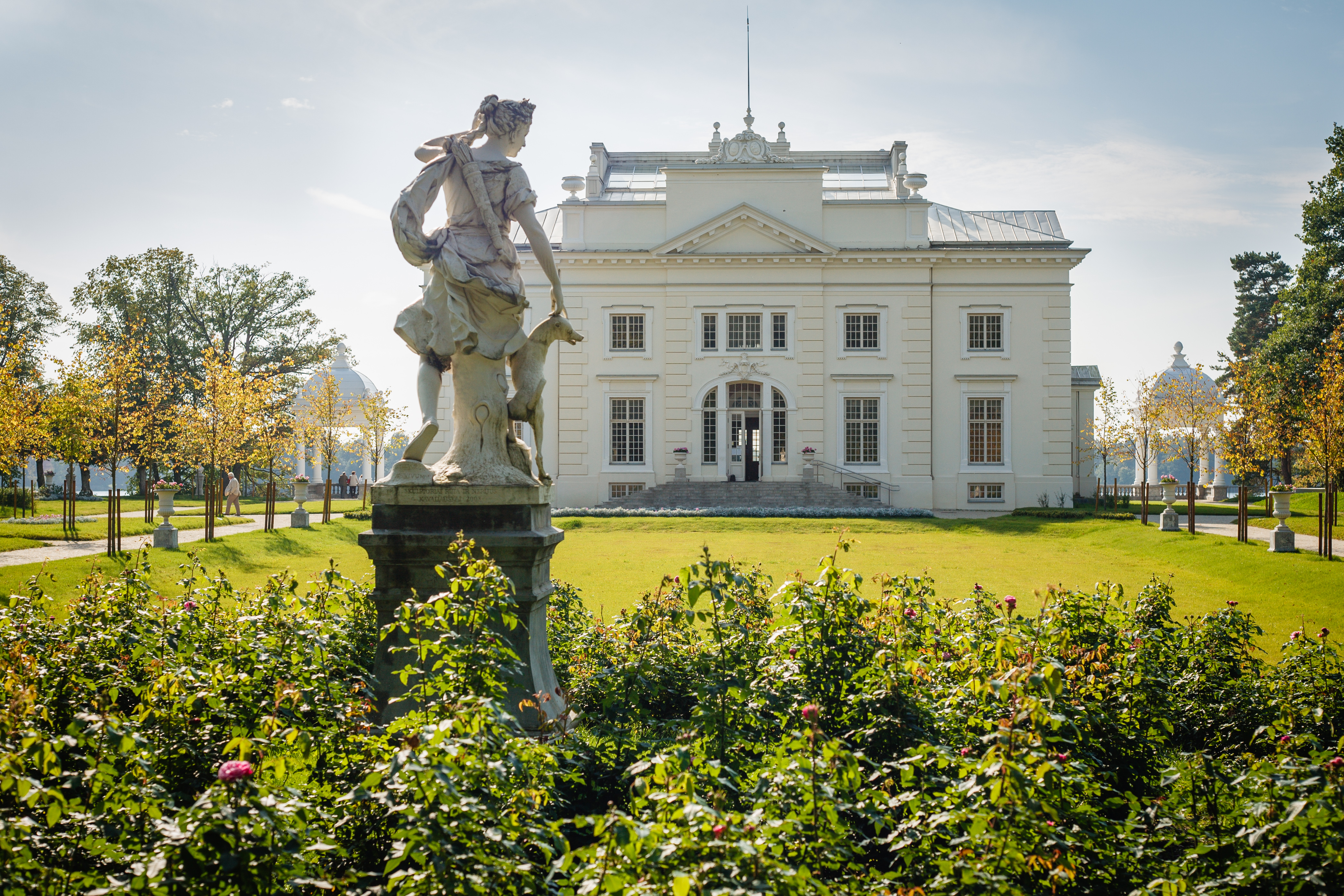
- Užutrakis Manor in 2012

- Location within Lithuania
- Interactive map of Užutrakis Manor
- 54.6597°N 24.9438°E
- Type: Residential manor
- Location: Užutrakis, Lithuania

History
- Built: 1896–1901
- Built for: Józef Tyszkiewicz (Juozapas Tiškevičius IV)

Site notes
- Architect: Józef Huss
- Architectural style: Classical Revival
- Owner: Trakai Historical National Park
- Website: uzutrakiodvaras.lt

Cultural Monuments of Lithuania
- Type: National
- Designated: 23 December 1999
- Reference no.: 1725

Užutrakis Manor (Lithuanian: Užutrakio dvaras, Polish: pałac Tyszkiewiczów w Zatroczu) is a late 19th-century residential manor of the Tyszkiewicz family in Užutrakis, on the shore of Lake Galvė, opposite the famous Trakai Castle.

The manor complex, constructed at the turn of the 19th and 20th centuries on the peninsula between Lake Galvė and Lake Skaistis, is regarded as one of the most prominent and culturally valuable manor houses in Lithuania. The period during which the manor was at its most prosperous, known as the "golden age", lasted for a mere two decades, from 1897 to 1917. This was the period during which Count Józef Tyszkiewicz resided at the manor.

== History ==
=== Early history ===
From the 16th century, the peninsula jutting out between lakes Galvė and Skaistis, on which the Užutrakis Estate was built, as well as surrounding lands, at that time, known as Algirdas Island was owned by Lithuanian Tatar nobles, who were invited to Lithuania by Grand Duke Vytautas the Great to serve in his personal guard. During later centuries, the ownership of the peninsula frequently changed. During the 18th century, it was the possession of the Seliava family, and subsequently, it came into the possession of Dominykas Karolis Karpis, the Canon of Vilnius Cathedral.

=== 19th century ===
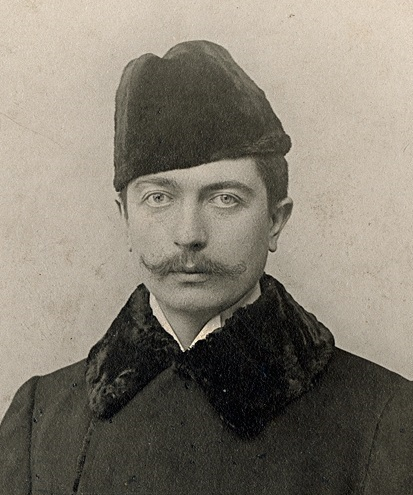
Józef Tyszkiewicz Jr. (1868–1917)

At the close of the 19th century, the site was acquired by Laurynas Odinecas, who constructed a brickwork Uniate chapel, the remains of which can still be seen today. In 1867, Count Józef Tyszkiewicz Sr. acquired the Užutrakis estate. At this time, the Tyszkiewicz family already owned the nearby lands of Trakų Vokė and Lentvaris. After he died in 1891, the estate was inherited by his son, also named Józef, who, together with his wife, Polish duchess Jadwiga Światopełk-Czetwertyńska, initiated major landscaping and reinforcement works on the shores of Lake Galvė. Construction of a new palace began in 1898, according to the project of the architect Józef Huss. The estate covered 800 hectares, 80 of which were reserved for the family residence.

=== 20th century ===
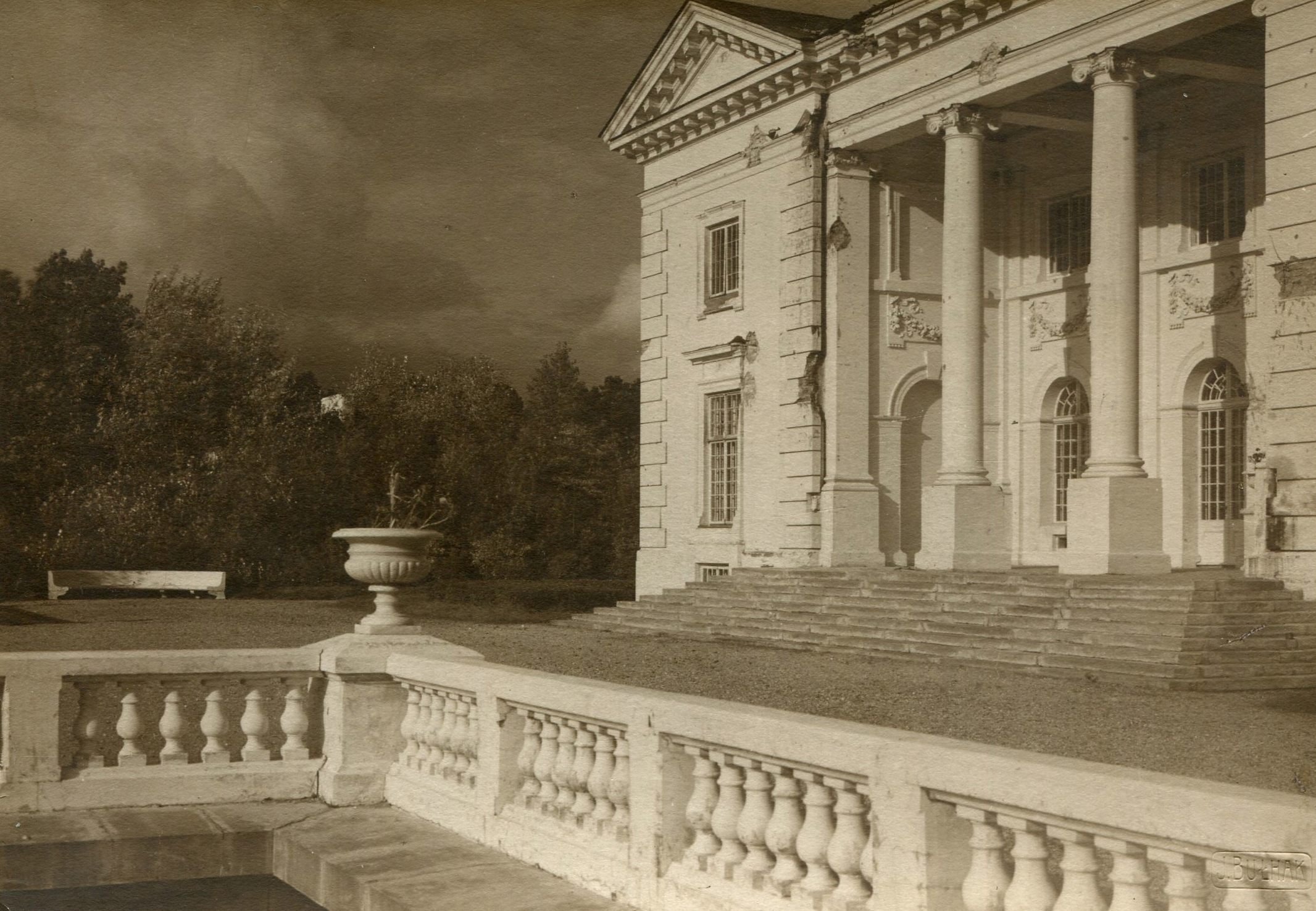
Užutrakis Manor during the interwar era

In 1901, the construction of a new Classical Revival manor house with Louis XVI style interiors was finished. The famous French landscape architect Édouard André designed a park that covered the entire peninsula. By 1901, Užutrakis was declared a fee tail (a system of inheritance which protected the family's assets from being divided up, as specific estates could only be inherited as a whole). From 1902 to 1921, the estate became the residence of the Tyszkiewicz family.

The Užutrakis Manor Estate was supported by a substantial farm, a large portion of which was located on the estate itself. Some distance from the mansion stood about 20 stone and wooden buildings: houses for the gardener, farm labourers, a ferryman (the family crossed the Galvė and Skaistis isthmus by raft), a distillery, a forge, a stable, etc. Half of the buildings have survived.

During the course of World War I, in the face of the advancing German army, Józef Tyszkiewicz Jr. and his family evacuated the manor. During the war, the manor house was damaged, and valuable interior elements were looted. The family settled in Helsinki, Grand Duchy of Finland, where Józef died in 1917. His wife, Duchess Jadwiga and son Andrzej Tyszkiewicz returned to Užutrakis after the war. Andrzej Tyszkiewicz revived the manor and owned it until the beginning of World War II.

Throughout World War II, after the Soviets occupied the Vilnius region and eventually the whole of Lithuania, Duchess Jadwiga fled to Kretinga Manor, the home of her brother-in-law, Alexander. She died there in 1940 and was buried in Family's chapel in the Kretinga cemetery. In 1939, Andrzej fled to London where he married Kamila Ibrahim-Achmetovič (1916–1973). Andrzej Tyszkiewicz died in 1973, leaving no children.

During the Nazi German occupation of Lithuania, a labour camp operated on the Užutrakis estate. This camp has been referenced in the testimonies of Holocaust survivors, and it is evident from the available sources that the camp commenced its operations at the onset of the Nazi occupation in August 1941, prior to the establishment of the Vilnius Ghetto.

Following Soviet re-occupation of Lithuania in 1944, Užutrakis manor was nationalized. After the war, it served as a sanatorium for high-ranking KGB officials, then as a Young Pioneers camp and recreation center, and later as a state tourist base. During this period, the manor estate suffered greatly: the original layout of the palace was destroyed, all valuables looted, and the park became abandoned. Buildings that clashed with the landscape and did not blend in with the manor's architecture were erected, and marble sculptures representing Roman gods made by the French artist Charles-Antoine Coysevox, as well as antique-style busts and vases, were broken or stolen.

=== Present day ===
The damage caused to the manor by the Soviet occupation began to be repaired only in 1998, when Lithuania had already regained its independence. In 1995, Užutrakis Manor was entrusted to the Trakai Historical National Park directorate. In 2000–2001, national-level territorial planning documents were prepared, which provided for the restoration and use of the Užutrakis manor complex for educational recreation, accommodation of tourists, and representative purposes of the Lithuanian state. The complex was also designated as a cultural center open to the public.

Currently, the manor house has been fully restored, the pavilions that adorned its terrace at the beginning of the 20th century have been rebuilt, including some of the farm buildings, the former granary and stable, which have been restored, and the former manor kitchen, which now houses a café.

== The Park ==
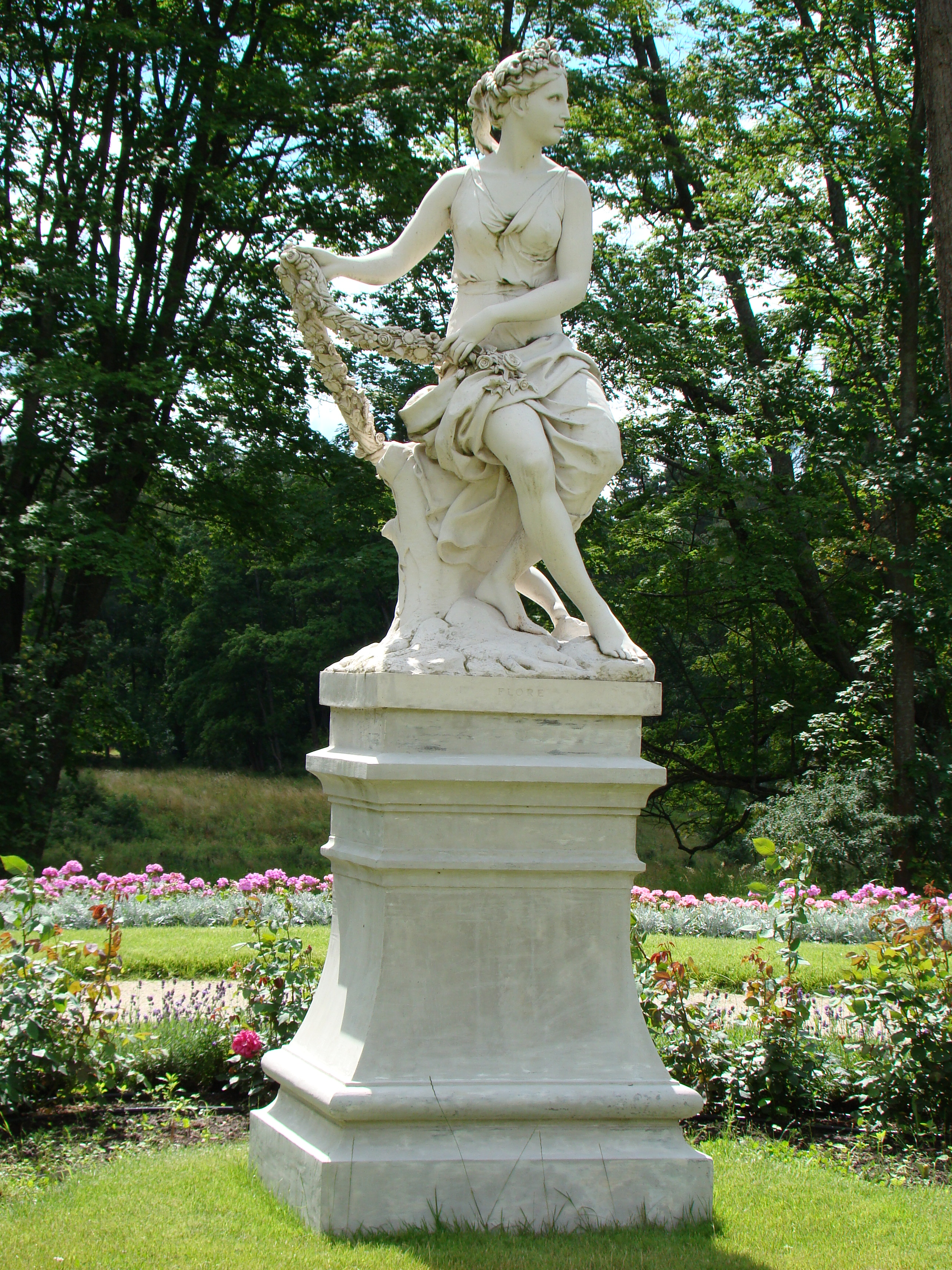
Statue of Goddess Flora in Užutrakis Manor park

The manor is surrounded by a mixed park designed by landscape architect Édouard André. The park includes parterres, avenues of linden trees, ornamental gardens, marble vases, sculptures, artificial hills, and more than 20 artificial ponds of varying sizes and shapes. There are 91 species of trees and shrubs growing in the park of the Užutrakis Manor, including 37 native species and 54 introduced species. The plant community of Užutrakis Park is more characteristic of Western Europe than of Lithuania, although rare Lithuanian plants also thrive in the park.

E. F. Andre designed two parterres for the Užutrakis Manor. The central parterre in front of the eastern façade of the manor was elliptical with two parallel walking paths in the middle and a path around the entire oval plane. The second parterre was located in front of the southern facade of the manor house. It was rectangular and ended with an ornate small balustrade with a long bench and large vases. The once elegant parterres of Užutrakis were abandoned after World War II. By the mid-20th century, both had been significantly deformed, their pathways planted with linden trees during a Young Pioneer work campaign. The overgrown trees obscured the rare plants of the formal parterres, thereby destroying the connection with the rest of the landscape park. The impact of the linden trees on the Užutrakis manor house was found to be the most negative, given that the house was completely obscured from view, although many of them have since been cut down.

Between 2004 and 2008, during the restoration of the central parterre, the sculptures of Goddess Diana and Flora were restored and rebuilt.
