= Senieji Trakai =

- Village
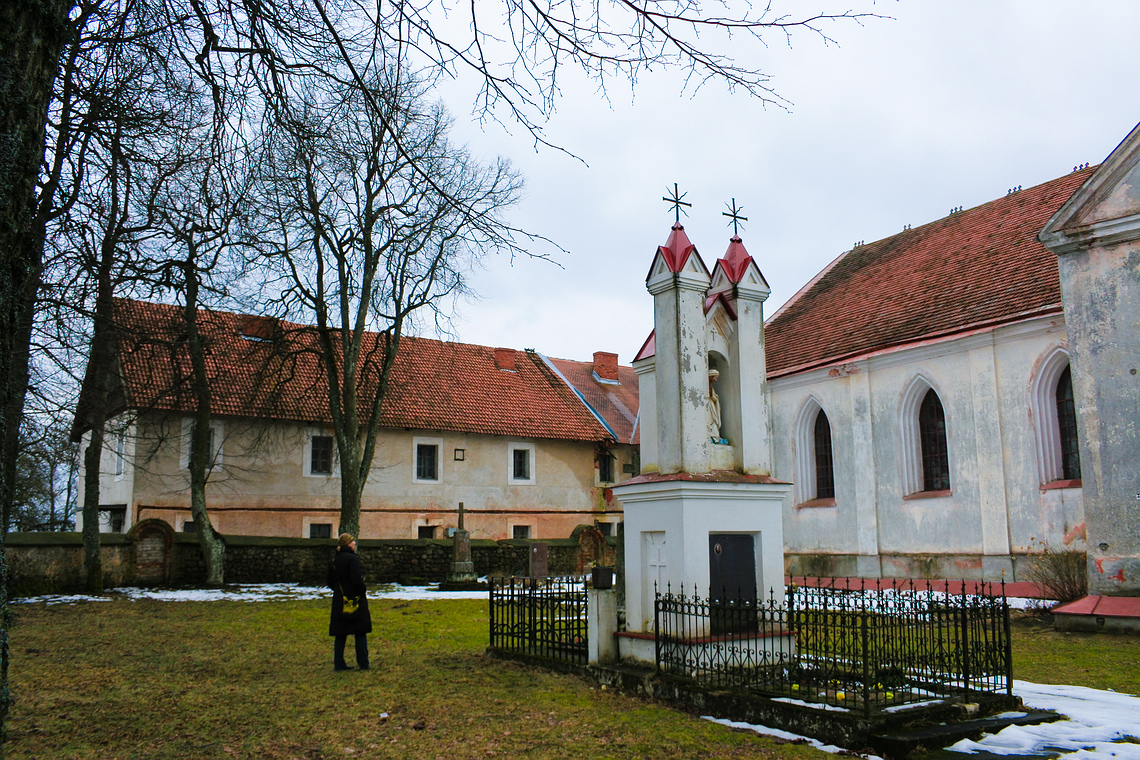
- The church and cloister built on the remains of the old castle

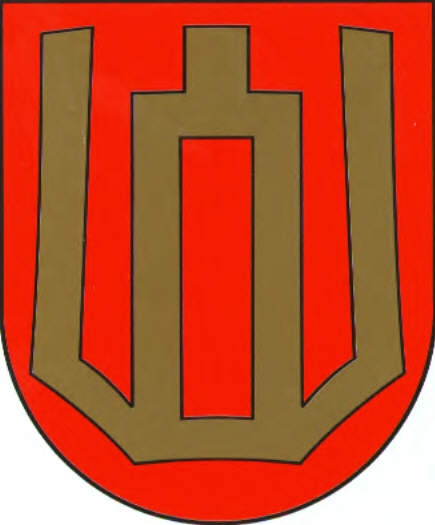
- Coat of arms

- Location of Senieji Trakai
- Coordinates: 54°37′N 24°58′E
- Country: Lithuania
- County: Vilnius County
- Municipality: Trakai district municipality
- Eldership: Senieji Trakai eldership
- Capital of: Senieji Trakai eldership
- Lithuania's capital transferred from Kernavė: 1321

Population (2021)
  - Total: 1,219
- Time zone: UTC+2 (EET)
  - Summer (DST): UTC+3 (EEST)

Senieji Trakai (literally: Old Trakai, Polish: Stare Troki) is a historic Lithuanian village located 3 kilometres (1.9 mi) east of Trakai. According to the Lithuanian census of 2011, it has 1,396 inhabitants – Lithuanians, Poles and Russians. The Saint Petersburg–Warsaw Railway passes through Senieji Trakai.

The central part of the village is proclaimed an architectural reserve. The main street is dominated by uniform wooden houses, facing it with two-windowed sides.

== Etymology ==
The Trakai name, derived from Lithuanian: trakas - "the glade", suggests that the castle was built in a hollow area after deforestation.

== History ==
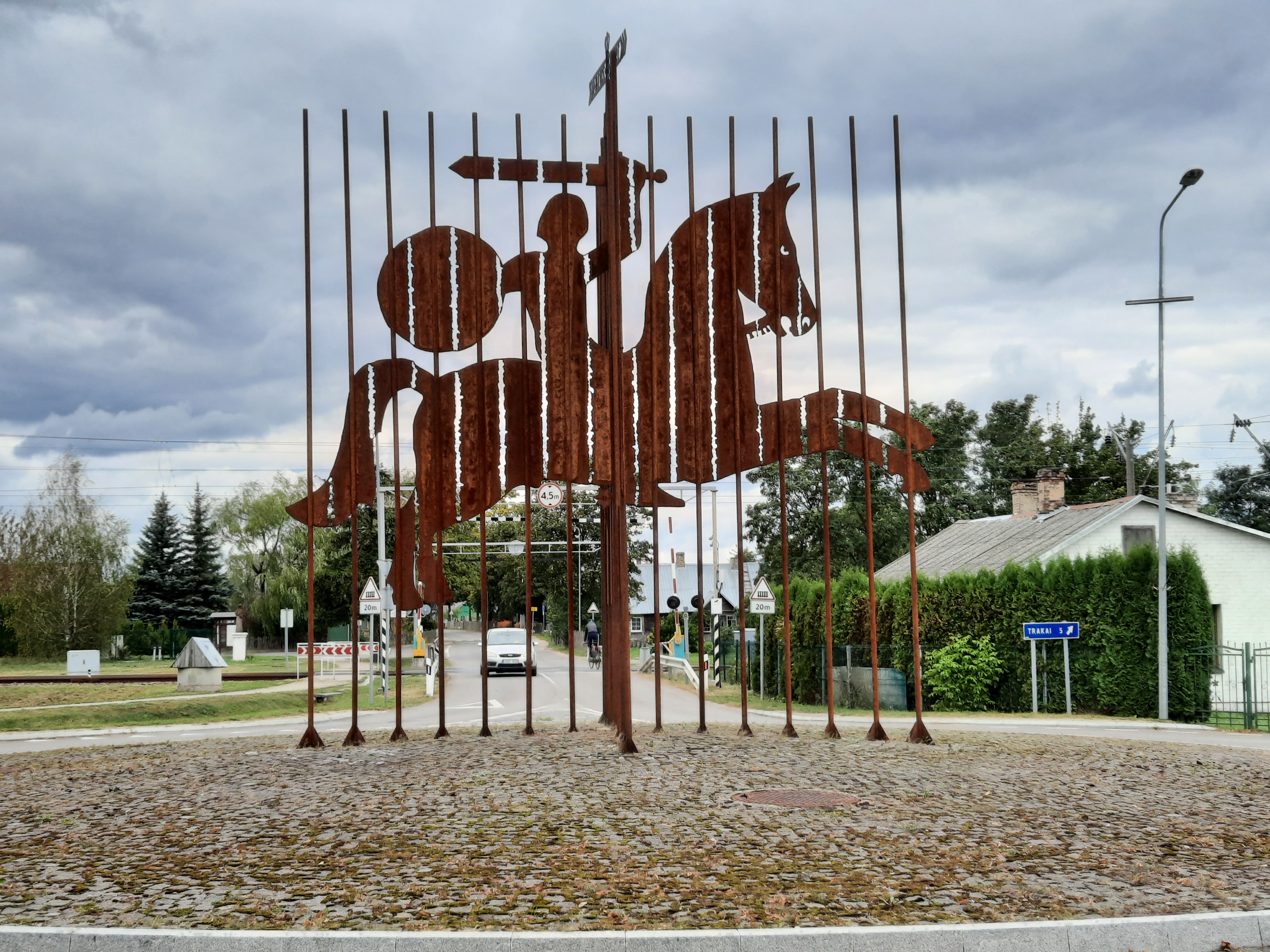
Monument to Vytautas

=== Grand Duke Gediminas ===
According to the Lithuanian Chronicle, Senieji Trakai was established by Grand Duke Gediminas who departed for hunting from Kernavė into another coast of the Neris River and personally liked a mound surrounded by oaks and plains. Sometime before 1321, Grand Duke Gediminas transferred the capital of Lithuania from Kernavė to Trakai (today's Senieji Trakai) and erected his brick castle. Senieji Trakai served as the capital of the Grand Duchy of Lithuania in 1316–1323 or in 1321–1322. In 1337, it became a seat of the newly established Duchy of Trakai.

=== Grand Duke Kęstutis ===
Gediminas' son Kęstutis erected a new castle in New Trakai (today's Trakai). Kęstutis' son Vytautas was born in Old Trakai ca. 1350.

=== Destruction by the Teutonic Order in 1391 ===
The castle in Senieji Trakai was destroyed by the Teutonic Order in 1391.

=== Grand Duke Vytautas ===
The ruins of the castle were donated to Benedictine monks by Vytautas in 1405. It is supposed that the present monastery building dating from the 15th century incorporates the remains of the Gediminas' castle.
