= Trakai Historical National Park =

National park in Lithuania

- Trakų istorinis nacionalinis parkas
- IUCN category II (national park)
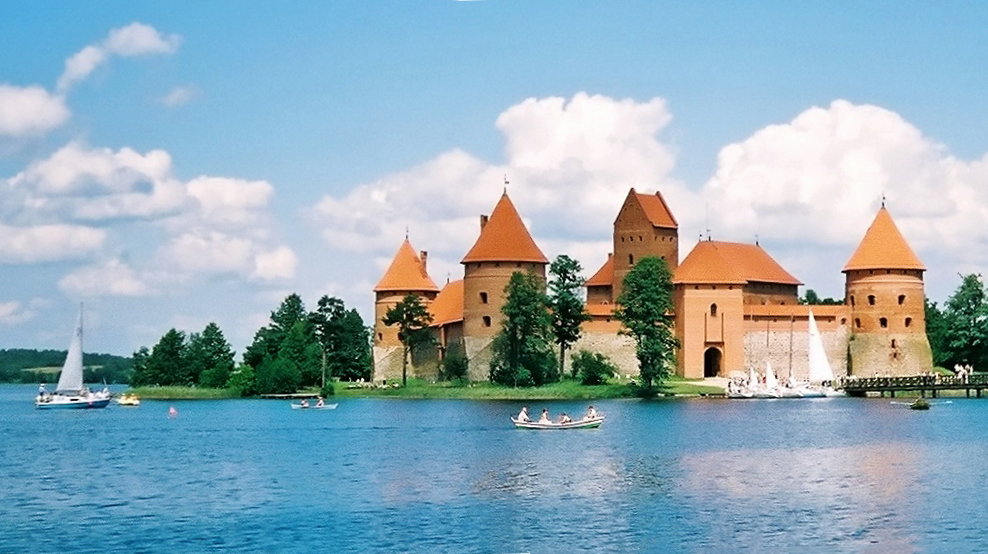
- Trakai Island Castle

- Location within Lithuania
- Interactive map of Trakai Historical National Park
- Location: Lithuania
- Nearest city: Trakai
- Coordinates: 54°38′20″N 24°25′08″E
- Area: 81.49 km^{2} (31.46 sq mi)
- Established: 1992

Logo of the Trakai Historical National Park

Trakai Historical National Park (Lithuanian: Trakų istorinis nacionalinis parkas) is a national park in Lithuania. It was designated in 1992 to embrace the historic city of Trakai, some 25 kilometers west of Vilnius, and the forests, lakes, and villages in its environs. It is a Category II park in the IUCN classification. It is the only historical national park in Europe.

The park is included in UNESCO's Tentative Lists.

== Nature ==
The parallel chains of hills and ridges formed by the glacier alternate with narrow and deep or wide and flat lake-like ridges. There are 32 lakes in the park. Lakes Galvė, Skaistis, Totoriškių, Luka connect with ducts and form a single system. The largest of the lakes is Lake Galvė with 21 islands (the most famous is Castle Island) and the cleanest is Akmena lake.

Of interest are the Kudrionys forest and the Plomėnų and Varnikai wetlands, where many mammals and bird species find refuge. Plomėnų swamp has a large colony of waterfowl and many species of protected plants. Lake Plomėnų is home to a large colonies of black-headed gulls. The nature of the Varnikai Reserve can be explored on a hiking trail.

The park is famous for the number of sights and it attractive surroundings. There is a hilltop on the north shore of Galvė lake, opening up great views.

== Gallery ==
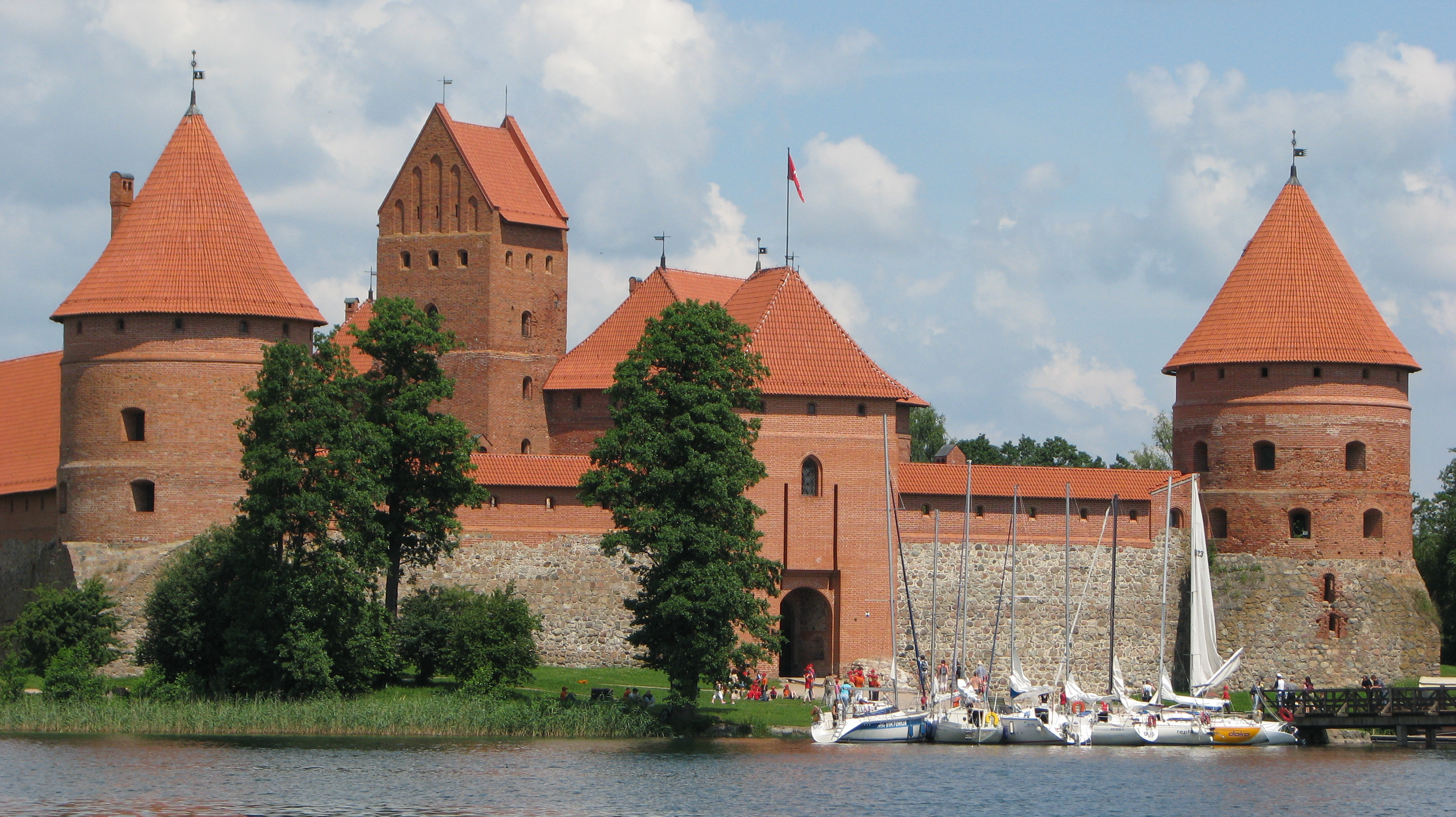
Trakai Island Castle

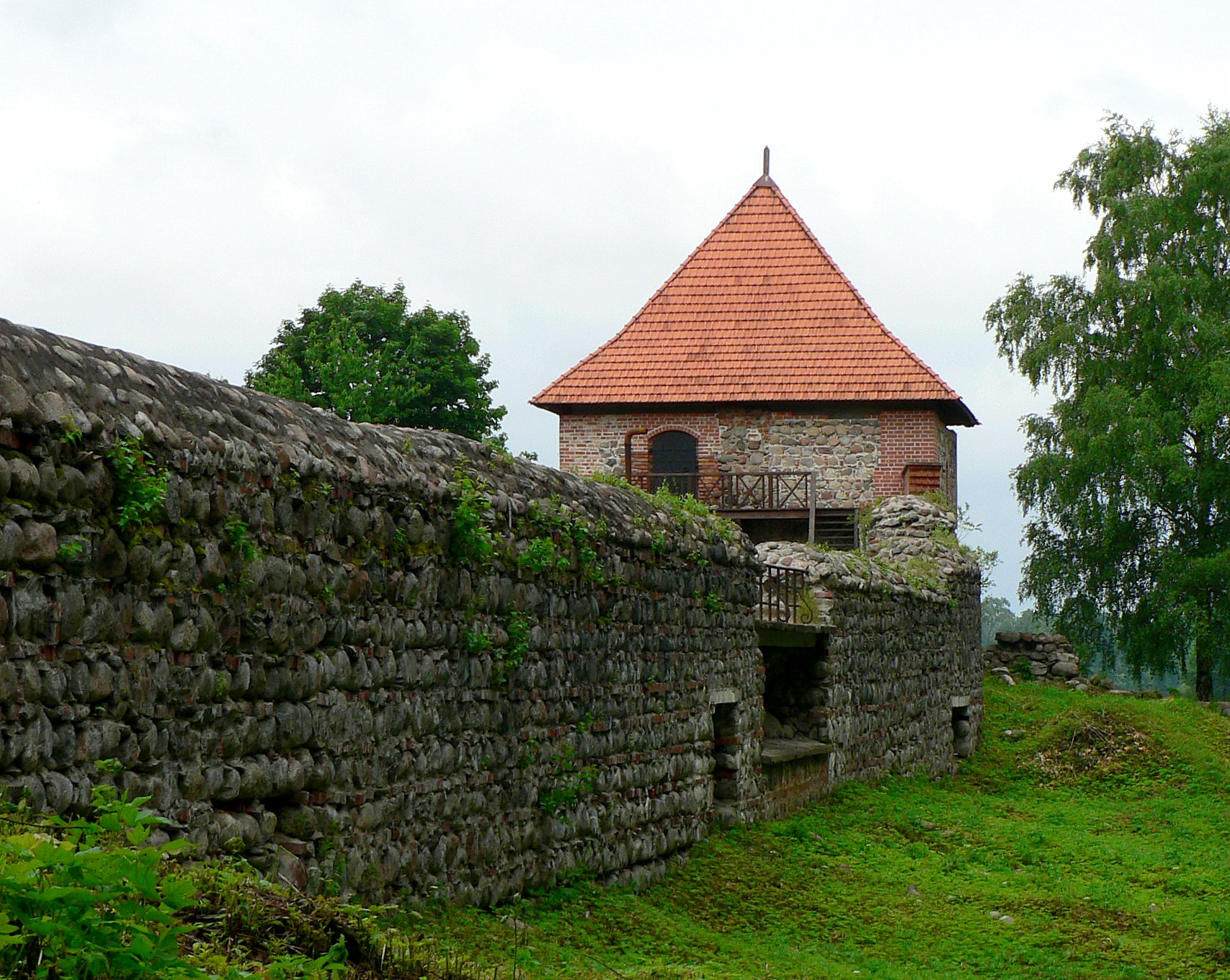
The old Trakai Peninsula Castle

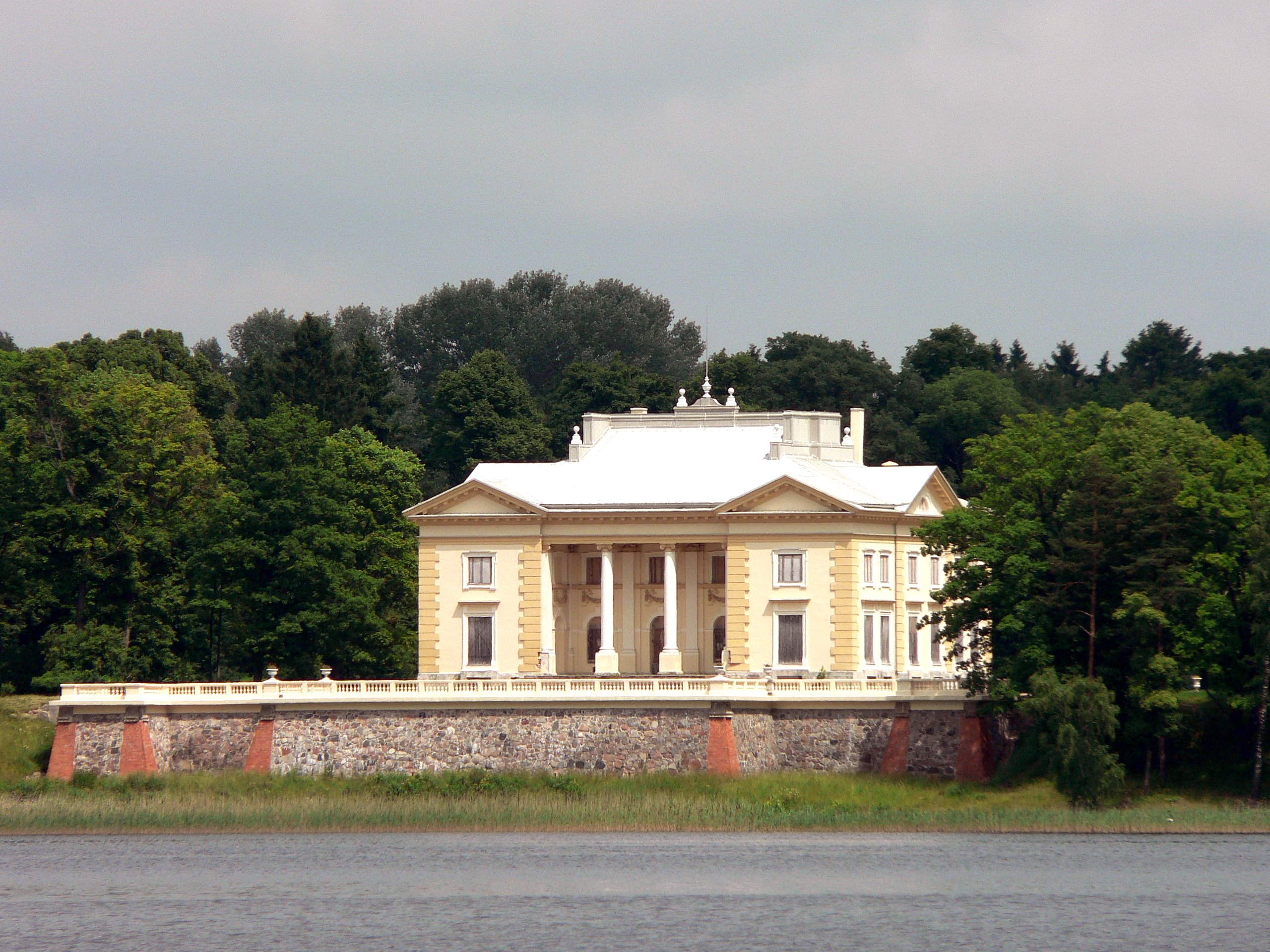
Užutrakis Manor, as seen from the lake

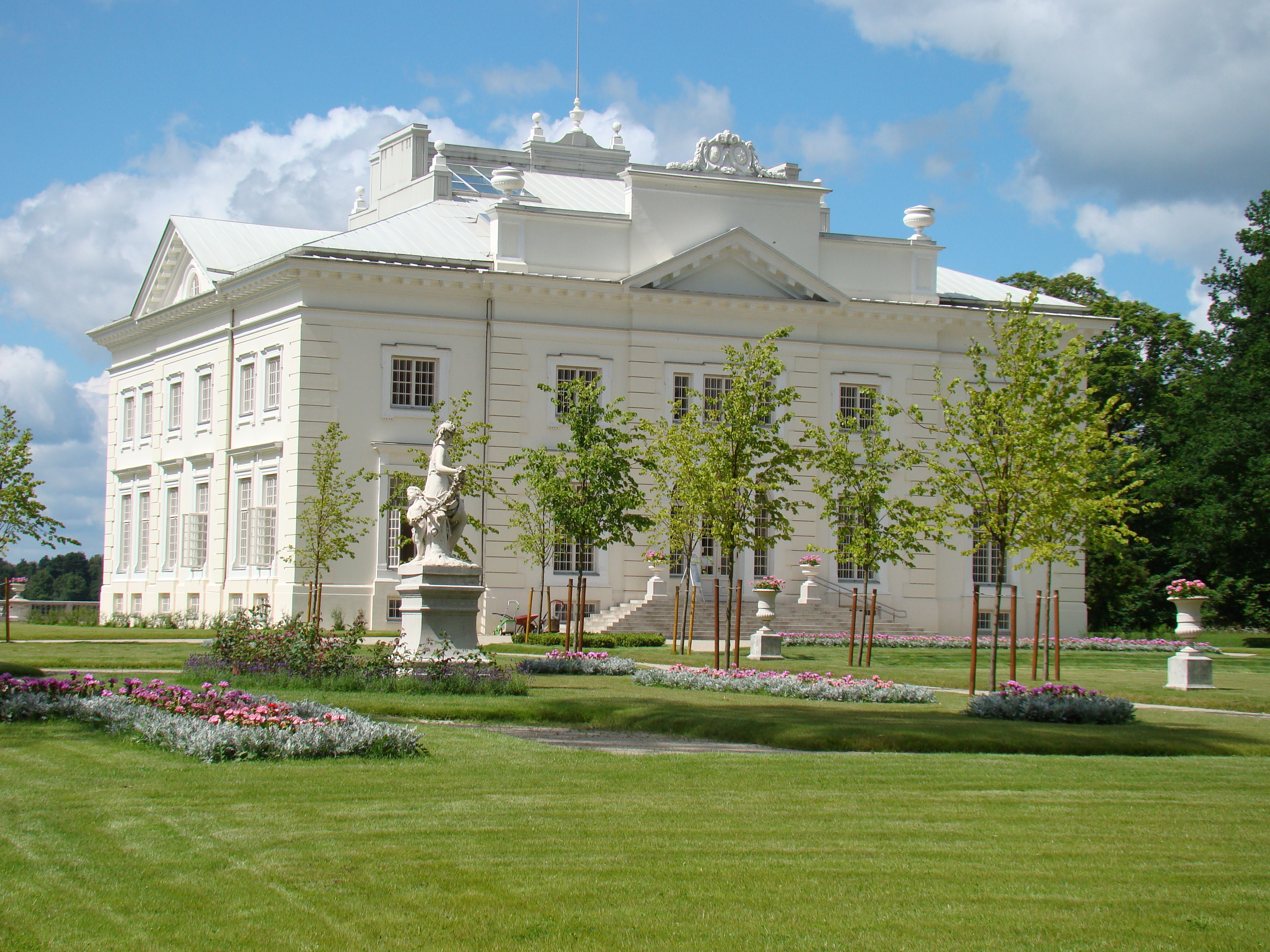
Užutrakis Manor garden

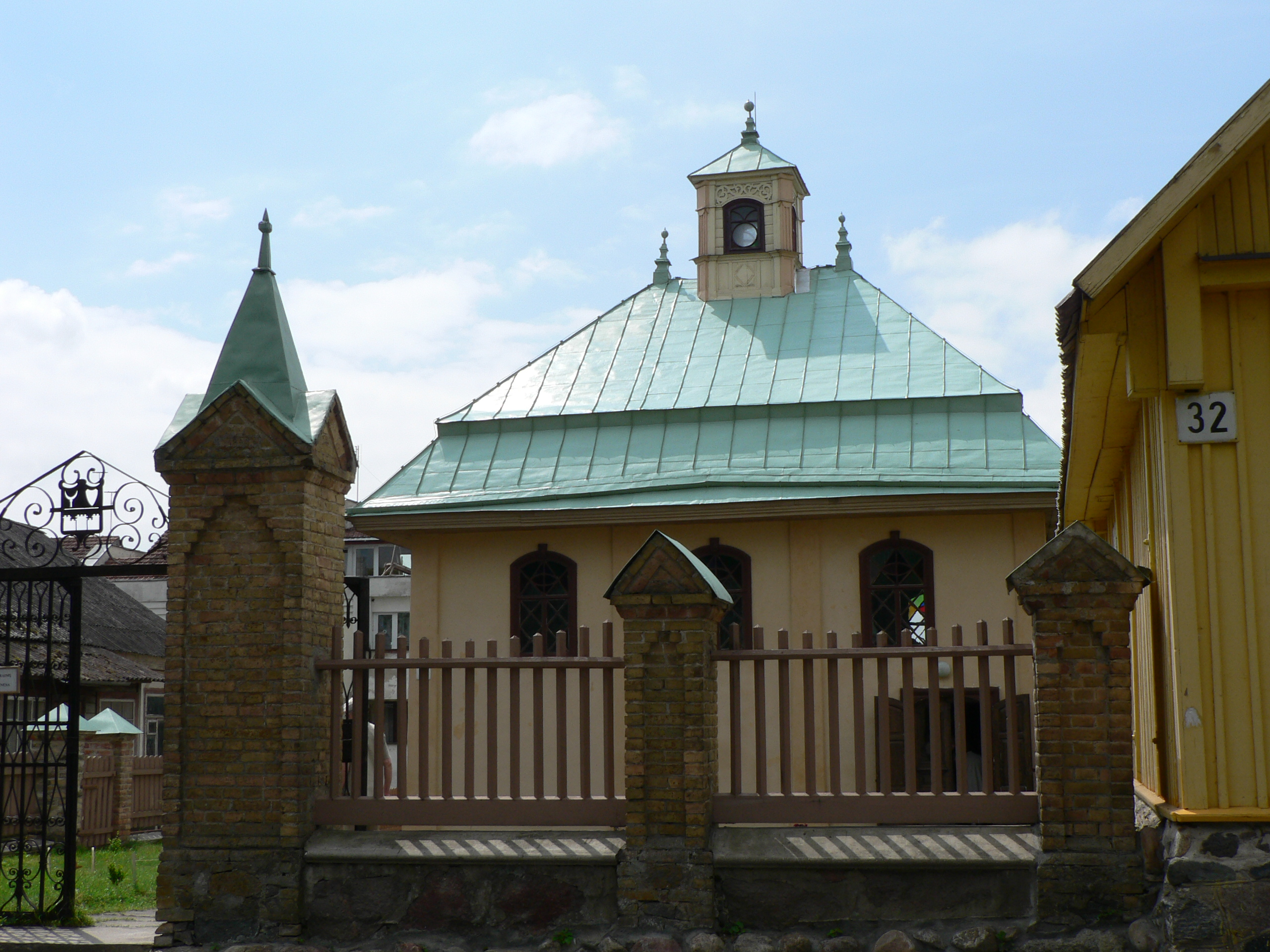
The Karaim kenesa

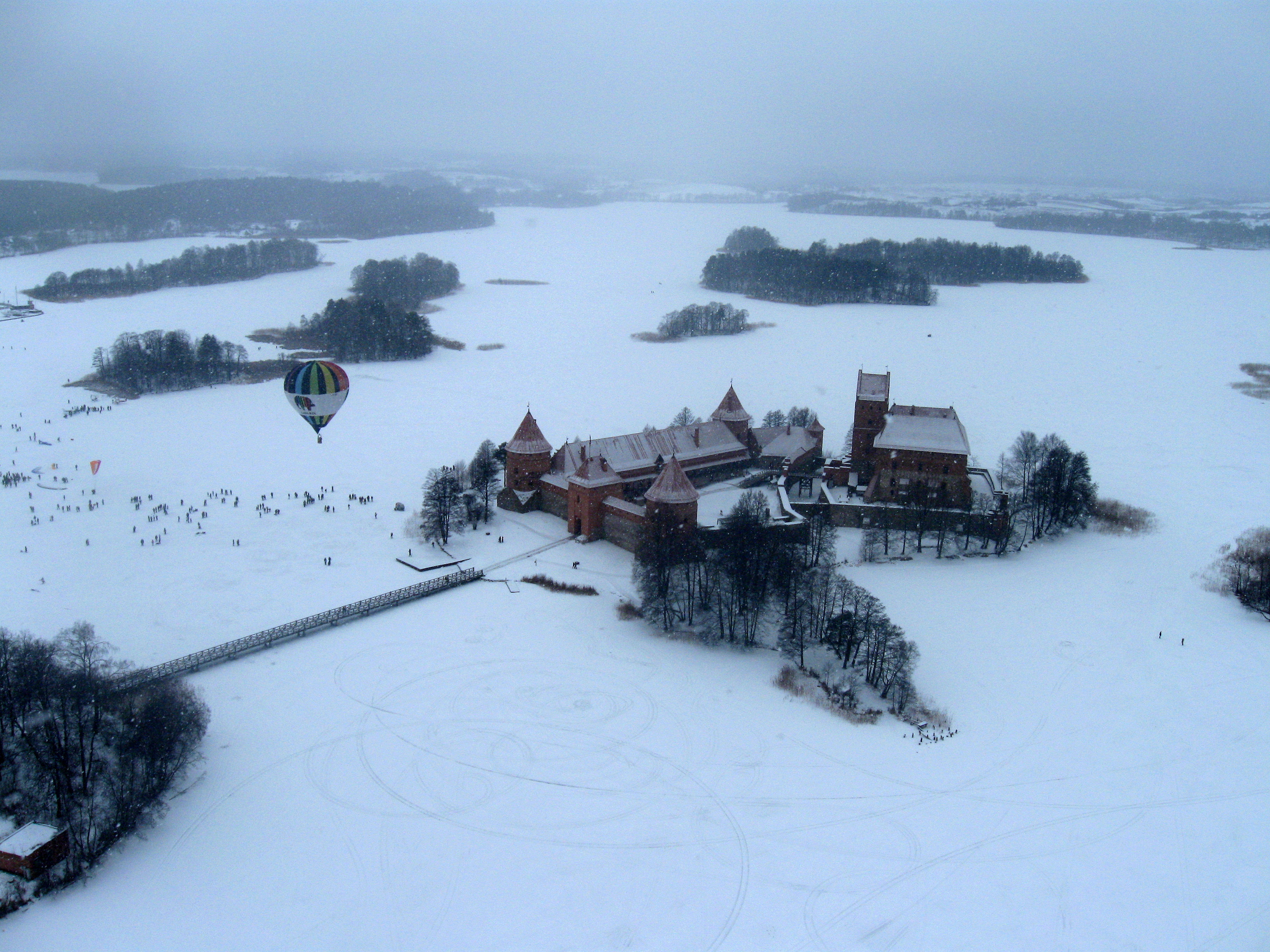
Hot air balloons flight over the national park

== See also ==
- List of national parks in the Baltics
