= Tiškevičius Chapel-Mausoleum =

Chapel in Kretinga, Lithuania

The Chapel and Mausoleum of the Tiškevičius Family
- Grafų Tiškevičių šeimos koplyčia-mauzoliejus (Lithuanian)
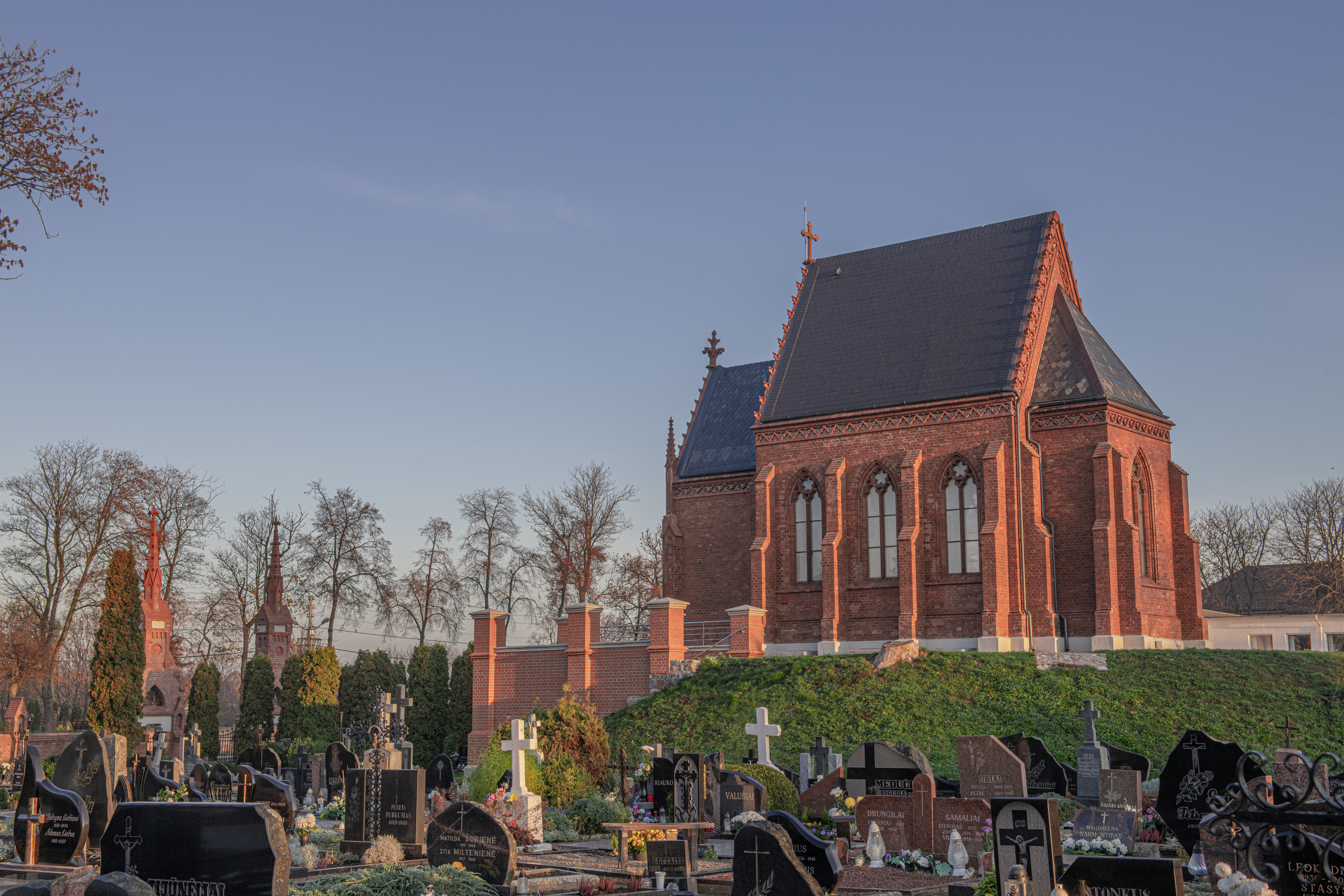
- Tiškevičiai Chapel and Mausoleum in Kretinga Old Graveyard
- Interactive map of The Chapel and Mausoleum of the Tiškevičius Family
- 55.894178°N 21.245121°E
- Location: Kretinga, Lithuania

History
- Built: 1893
- Built for: Aleksander Tyszkiewicz and Zofia Tyszkiewicz née Horwatt
- Original use: Mausoleum

Site notes
- Architect: Karl Eduard Strandmann
- Restored: 2017
- Current use: Museum
- Owner: Kretinga Museum
- Website: Official website

The Chapel and Mausoleum of the Tiškevičius Family (Lithuanian: Grafų Tiškevičių šeimos koplyčia-mauzoliejus), along with the fence the eastern and western gates of the graveyard, rests in the site of the Old Graveyard of Kretinga Parish and forms a single complex. It is a state-protected cultural heritage object of regional significance.

== History ==
The chapel, of a neo-Gothic style, was built in 1893 by the order of the last owner of Kretinga, Count Aleksandras Tiškevičius (Aleksander Tyszkiewicz). First, a wrought stone and red brick basement-mausoleum was built, which was surrounded by a mound of earth, for the burial of the Tyszkiewicz family (Tiškevičiai) members. To prevent the earth mound from moving, the chapel was surrounded by a high fence built of red bricks fired in the Kretinga brickyard. In the first half of the 20th century, funeral services would take place in the above-ground section of the chapel.

The interior of the chapel was decorated with wall paintings. In front of the central nave, in the apse, a wooden neo-Gothic altar with four sculptures of the evangelists, which was brought from Warsaw in 1894, was situated along with a bas-relief of the Corpus that was brought from Germany. The sculptures were stolen during Soviet times, and the Christ bas-relief was stolen in 1989. In 1975, the chapel was passed on to the Kretinga Regional Studies Museum, and since then the chapel has been restored three times.

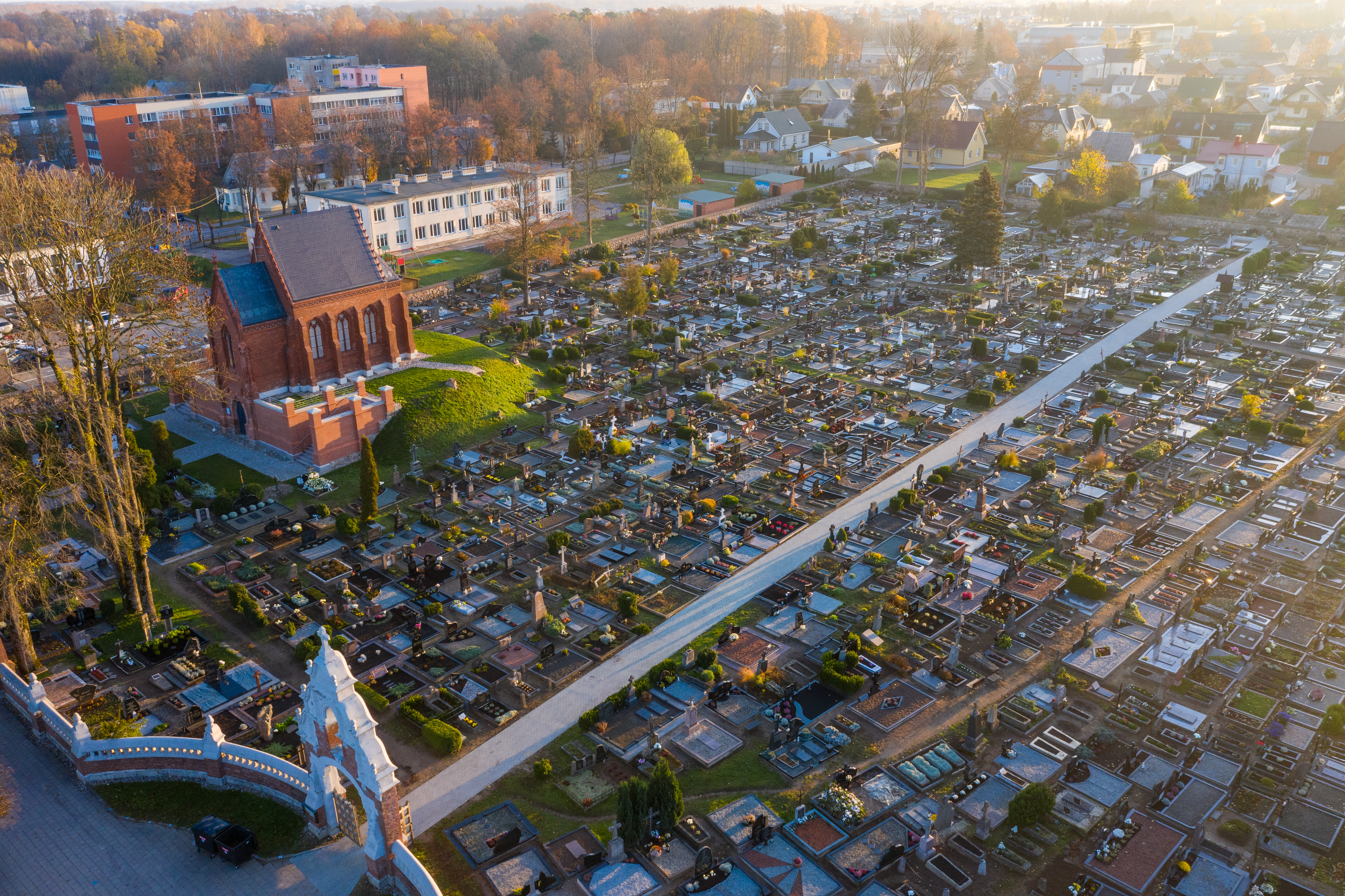

The remains of Tyszkiewicz family members rest in the mausoleum of the chapel, with Count Juozas Tyszkiewicz and his grandson Kazimieras Viktoras Justinas Marija Tyszkiewicz among them. The grandson was the last representative of the Tyszkiewicz family, to whom the chapel belonged, and he took part in the 1941 Lithuanian War of Independence where he was the leader of the Samogitian insurgent squad. In 2018, the Count Tyszkiewicz Family Chapel-Mausoleum was renovated and adapted for educational activities and cultural tourism. In the crypt of the chapel, an exhibition of the Count Tyszkiewicz Family Chapel-Mausoleum was installed, while on the chapel floor there is an exhibit of sacral art – the heads of forged crosses as well as devotional items. The Count Tyszkiewicz Family Chapel-Mausoleum is an inseparable part of the Kretinga Mansion complex.

== Gallery ==
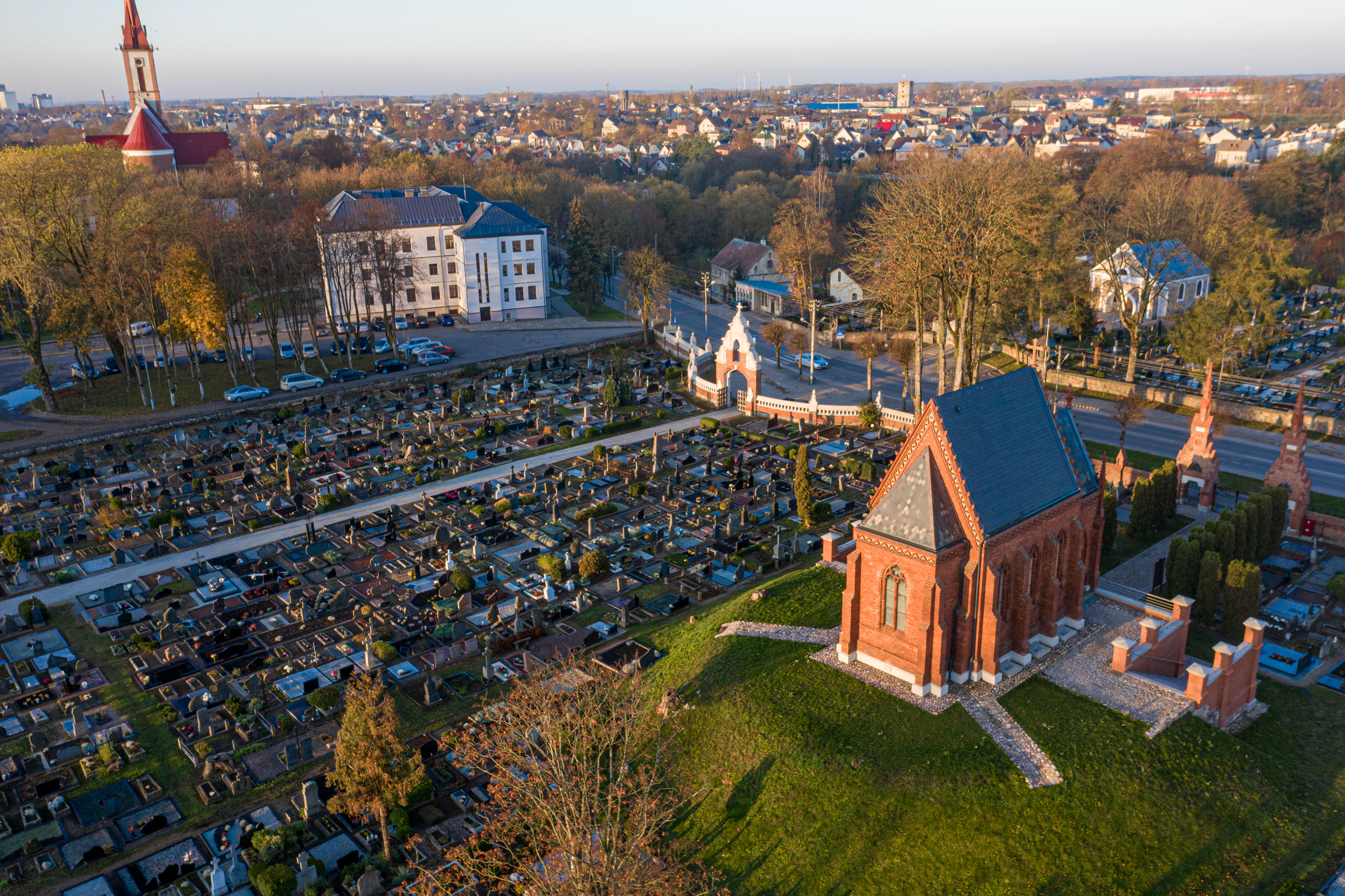

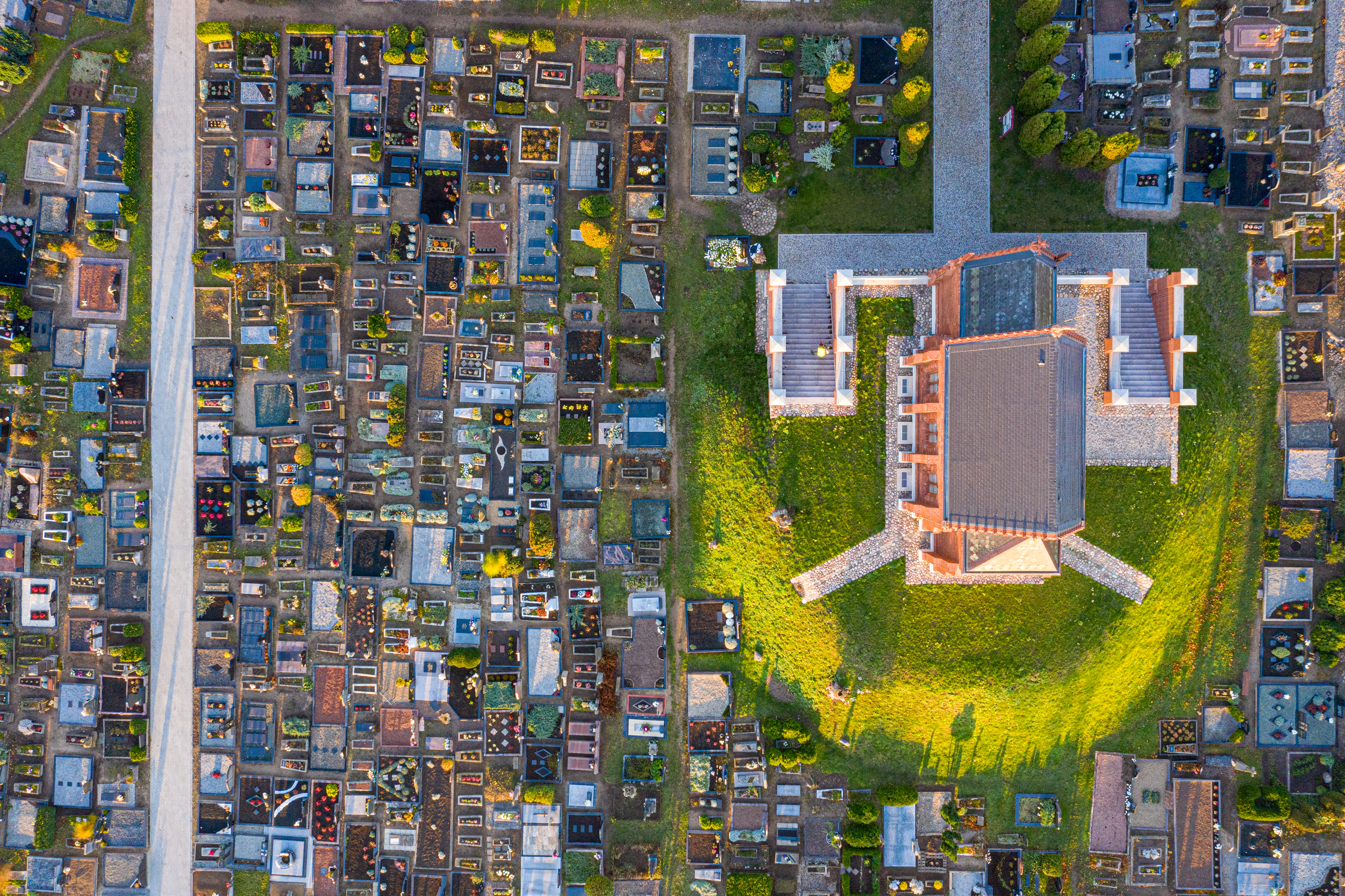

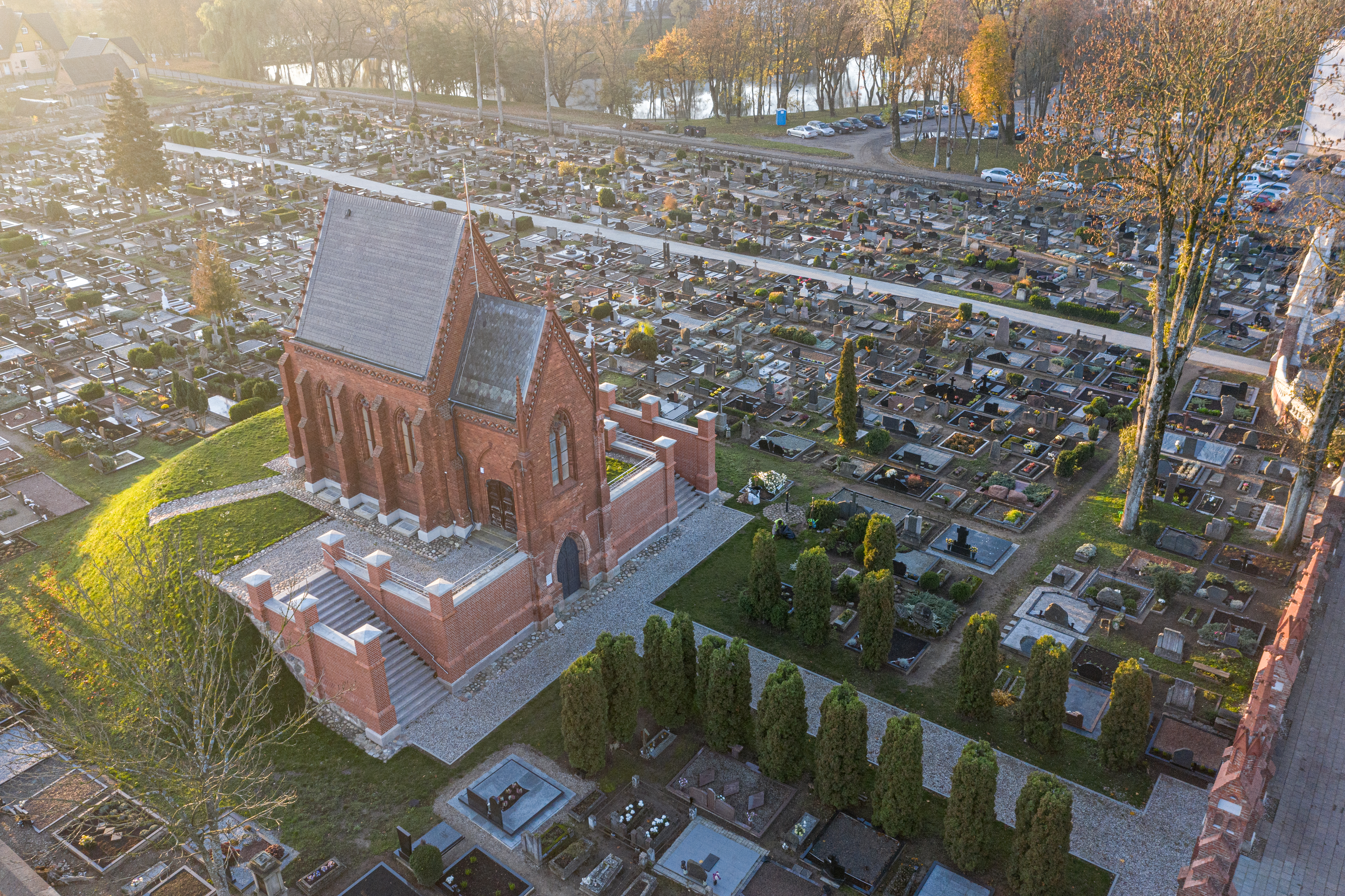

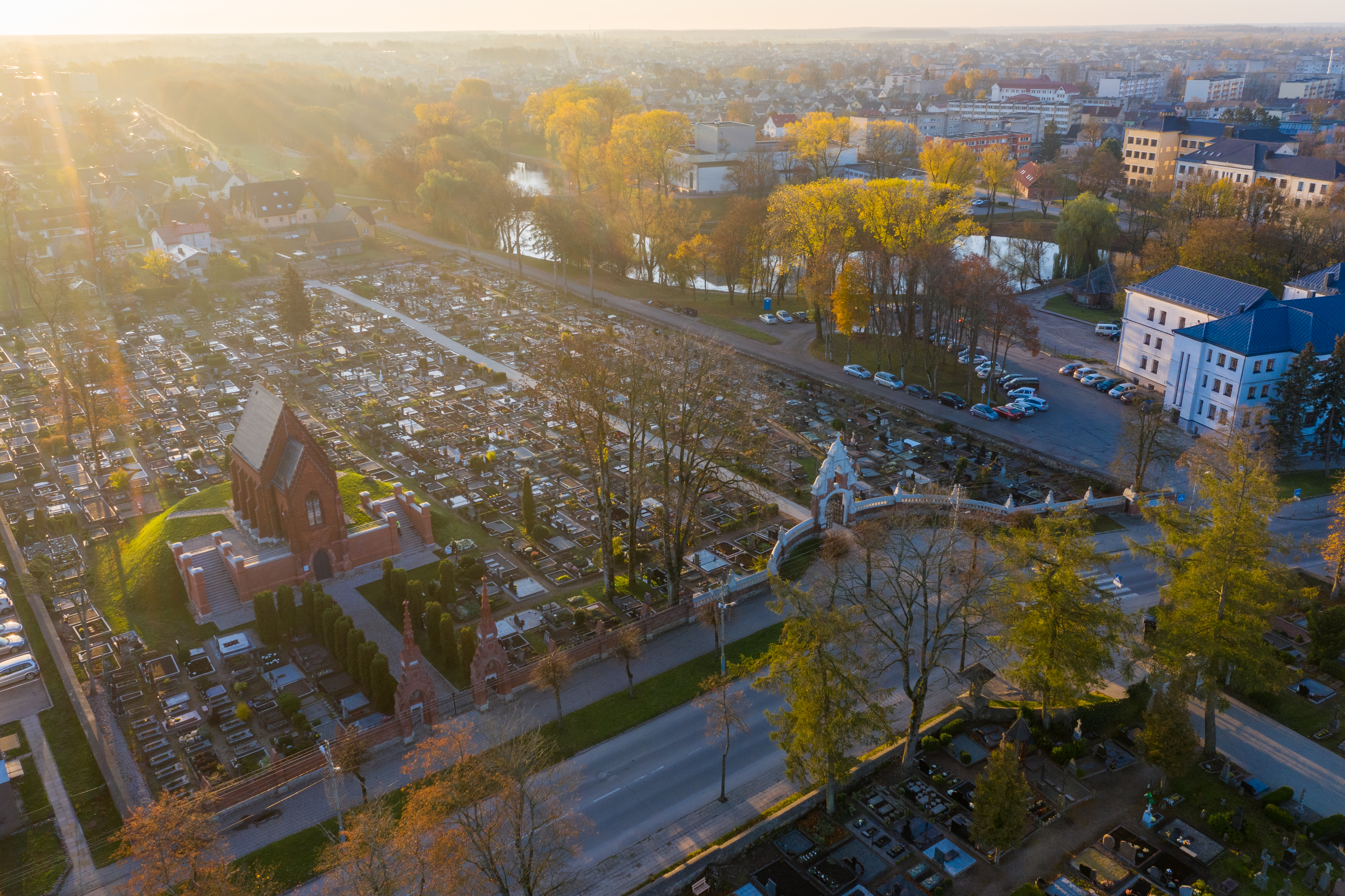
