= Senieji Trakai Castle =

Coordinates: 54°36′18″N 24°59′03″E

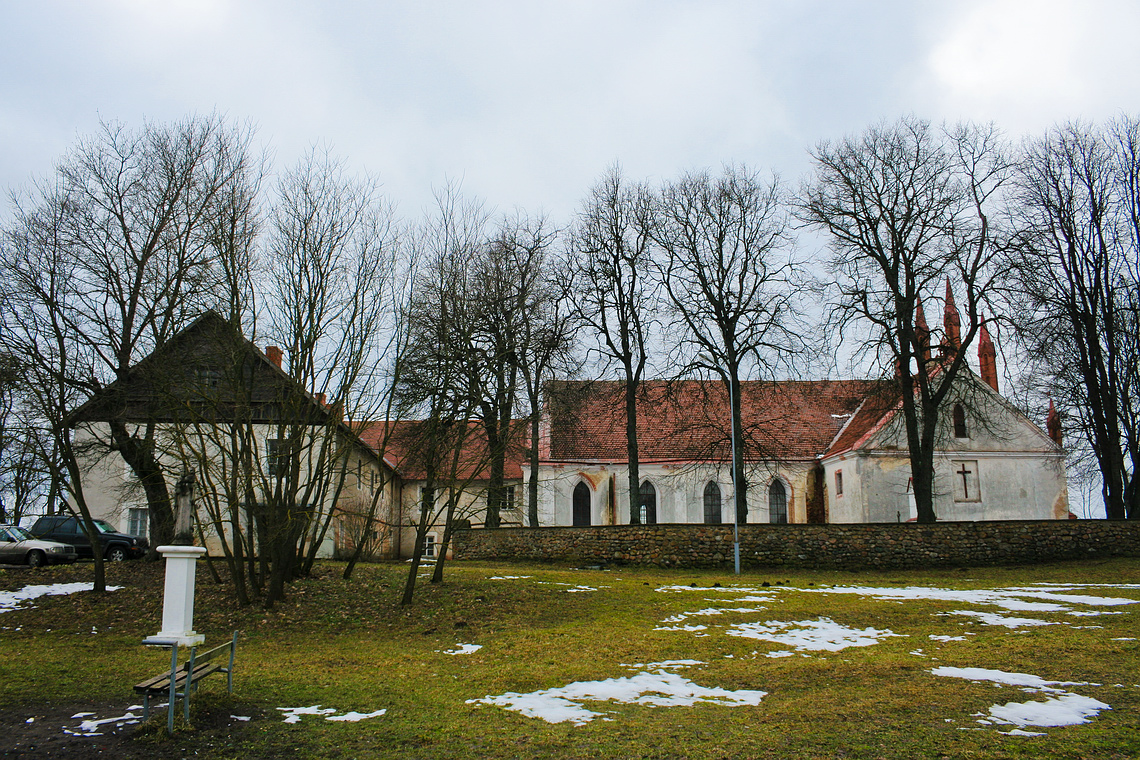
The church and cloister containing the remains of the castle

Senieji Trakai Castle was a castle in Senieji Trakai (literally: Old Trakai), Lithuania.

The first enclosure-type brick castle was built by Grand Duke Gediminas, who transferred the capital of Lithuania from Kernavė to Trakai (today's Senieji Trakai) before 1321. The wedding of Grand Duke Kęstutis and Birutė was held there and it was the birthplace of the Grand Duke Vytautas in 1350.

The castle in Senieji Trakai was destroyed by the Teutonic Order in 1391, subsequently abandoned and never rebuilt as a new castle had been erected in Trakai by Kęstutis. The ruins of the castle were granted to Benedictian monks by Vytautas in 1405. It is presumed that the present monastery building, dating from the 15th century, holds the remains of Gediminas' castle.

Archaeological research on the hillfort mound was carried out in 1996–1997. The findings confirmed the existence of a former rectangular masonry castle wall, which had surrounded the hill. It is supposed that the residential buildings had occupied the area near the church and the churchyard.

== See also ==
- Trakai Peninsula Castle
- Trakai Island Castle
- List of castles in Lithuania
