= Józef Huss =

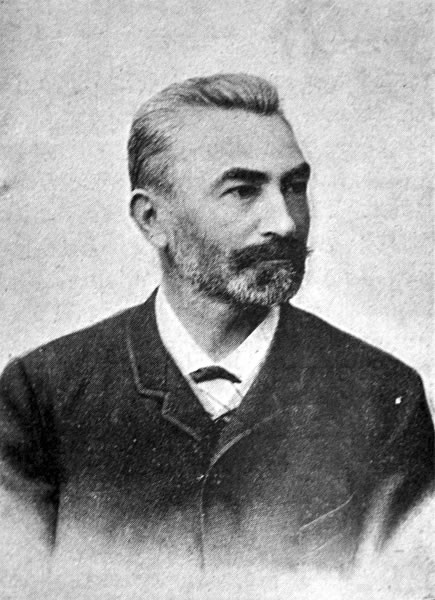
Józef Huss

Józef Huss (11 June 1846, Krzeszowice — 15 February 1904, Warsaw) was a Polish architect and restorer of monuments, one of the leading representatives of Polish eclecticism. After studying at the Royal School of technology in Charlottenburg, in 1866 he settled in Warsaw. At first he worked with Józef Orłowski. From 1873 he was one of the leading representatives of eclecticism Warsaw.

== Works ==
- pałacyk Elizy Wielopolskiej w Alejach Ujazdowskich 15 w Warszawie (1875–1876)
- dom Bauerfeinda przy Al. Jerozolimskich 5 (1876)
- dom dr Monkiewicza przy al. Ujazdowskich 3 (1877)
- dwór w Orłowie (1880)
- odbudowa pałacu w Królikarni (1880)
- rozbudowa kamienicy Istomina (1882)
- przebudowa domu Strassburgerów przy ul. Królewskiej 10 (1884)
- dom Borkowskiego przy ul. Marszałkowskiej 110 (1884–1887)
- budowa oficyny poprzecznej domu przy Krakowskim Przedmieściu 30 (1895)
- rozbudowa (skrzydło biblioteki) pałacu Przeździeckich przy ul. Foksal 6 w Warszawie (1891–1892)
- Kościół św. Augustyna w Warszawie na Nowolipkach (1891–1896)
- pałac Tyszkiewiczów w Zatroczu koło Wilna (1896–1901)
- dworzec Kolei Warszawsko-Kaliskiej (dworzec Warszawa Kaliska) w Alejach Jerozolimskich w Warszawie (1902)
- Dom Pod Gryfami (kamienica Fuchsa, Classenów) przy pl. Trzech Krzyży 18 (ul. Bracka 2) w Warszawie (1884–1886); trzy kopuły, wzorowane na *---warszawskiej Królikarni, nieodbudowane po wojnie, przywrócone podczas remontu (2006)
- odnowienie Pałacu Uruskich przy Krakowskim Przedmieściu 30

== Footnotes ==
- Łoza Stanisław.: Architekci i budowniczowie w Polsce. Warszawa 1954, te daty to odpowiednio 11 kwietnia 1848 i 12 lutego 1904.

== Bibliography ==
- Łoza S.: Architekci i budowniczowie w Polsce, Warszawa 1954
