= Trakai Peninsula Castle =

Castle in Trakai, Lithuania

Coordinates: 54.646°N 24.937°E

Trakai Castle
- Trakai pilis (Lithuanian)
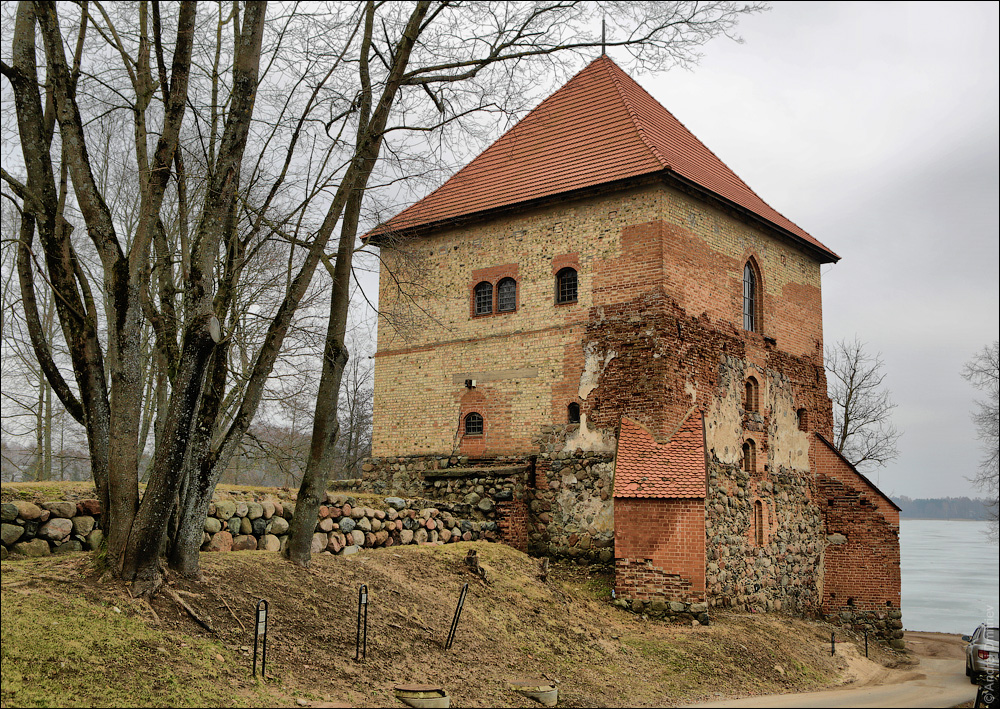
- Trakai Peninsula Castle, The largest and best-preserved southern tower

- Location within Lithuania
- Interactive map of Trakai Castle
- Type: Castle
- Location: Trakai, Lithuania

History
- Built: 1350–1377
- Built for: Duke Kęstutis

Site notes
- Architectural style: Brick Gothic

Cultural Monuments of Lithuania
- Type: National
- Designated: 12 June 1998

Trakai Peninsula Castle is one of the castles in Trakai, Lithuania. It is located on a peninsula between southern Lake Galvė and Lake Luka. Built around 1350–1377 by Kęstutis, Duke of Trakai, it was an important defensive structure protecting Trakai and Vilnius, capital of the Grand Duchy of Lithuania, against attacks of the Teutonic Knights. Much of the castle was destroyed in the 17th century. Remaining walls and towers are preserved and protected by the Trakai Historical National Park.

The castle had seven towers connected by a 10 m (33 ft) high wall. The three largest towers, measuring 15 m × 15 m (49 ft × 49 ft), protected the most vulnerable southwestern flank. A 12–14 m (39–46 ft) wide moat separated the structure from the town. The castle was attacked in 1382 and 1383 (during the civil war of 1381–1384) and in 1390 (during the civil war of 1389–1392). After the 1422 Treaty of Melno, the castle lost its significance as a defensive structure. It is known that Grand Dukes used it as a residence. Sigismund Kęstutaitis was murdered in the castle on 20 March 1440.

In the 16th century the castle was used as a prison. It was destroyed during the Russo-Polish War (1654–1667) and never rebuilt. The territory was granted to a Dominican cloister in 1678 by Marcjan Aleksander Ogiński, Voivode of Trakai. It was not until the 1770s that the monks eventually built their monastery and church; these buildings are also part of the castle ensemble.

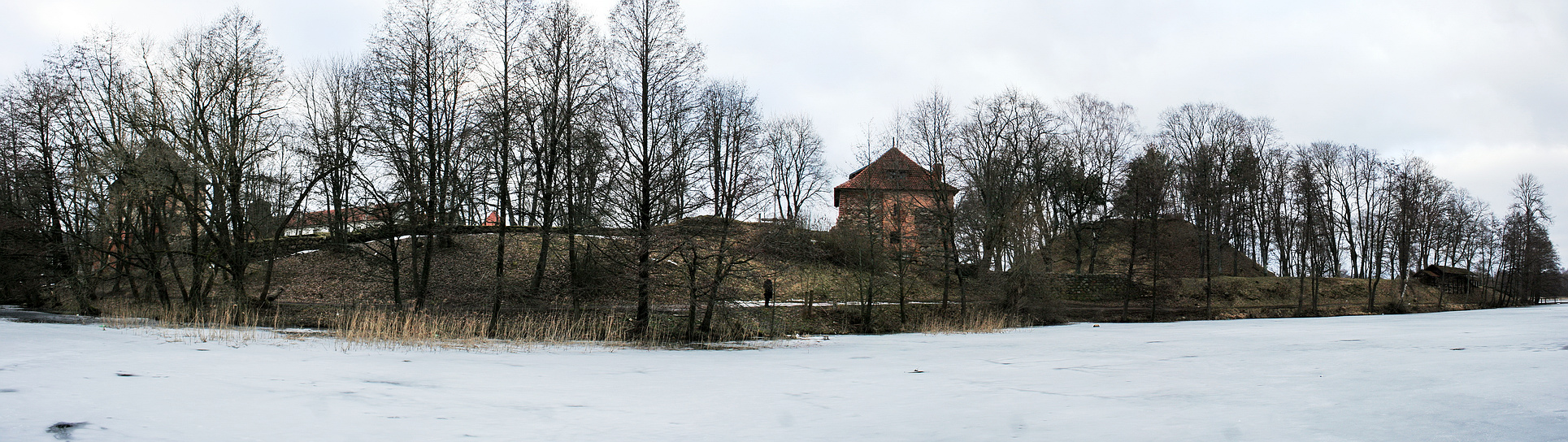
Trakai Peninsula Castle panorama from the eastern side

== See also ==
- Trakai Island Castle
- Old Trakai Castle
- List of castles in Lithuania
- Gothic architecture in Lithuania
