= Kretinga Museum =

Kretinga Manor
- Kretingos Dvaras
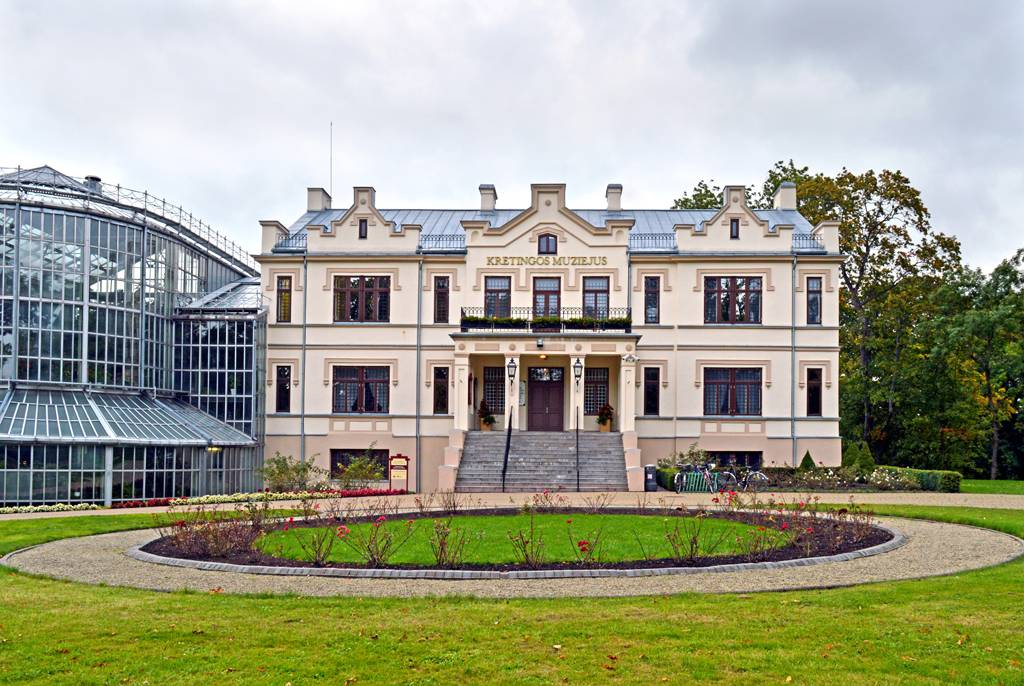

General information
- Type: Manor
- Architectural style: Neoclassicism
- Location: Kretinga, Lithuania
- Coordinates: 55.9000°N 21.2486°E
- Estimated completion: 15-16th century
- Owner: Kretinga Museum

The Kretinga Museum (Lithuanian: Kretingos muziejus), also known as Kretinga Manor, is located near the Baltic Sea in Kretinga, Lithuania. Originally a private estate, it was converted to a museum in 1992, and now contains a number of archeological finds, fine and applied art collections, folk art, and ethnographic exhibits, as well as a restored orangery. Nearby is a sculpture garden featuring a reconstruction of a Lithuanian solar calendar. The museum is operated by the Kretinga district municipality.

== History ==
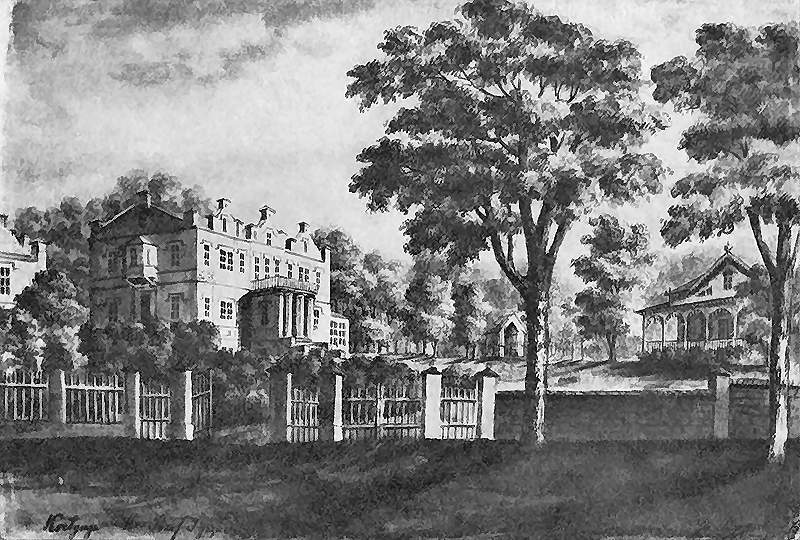
Tiškevičiai Palace, 19th century

The manor's location had always provided shelter from maritime winds in the area. Its modern history is said to have begun when the bishop of Vilnius, Ignacy Jakub Massalski, planted fruit trees there in the late 18th century. In 1874 the land was purchased in an auction by Count Tyszkiewicz. In the course of creating a family manor, he converted the existing residence into a palace, built the orangery, now known as the Winter Garden, and re-landscaped the grounds. The landscaping included cascading ponds, a waterfall, arbors, fountains, sculptures, and parterres.

The idea of turning the manor into a museum is credited to Juozas Žilvitis (1903–1975); the Kretinga Museum Committee was established in 1935. The garden was completely destroyed during World War II. In 1940 the museum became a branch of the Kaunas State Museum (now the Vytautas the Great War Museum). In 1987 the greenhouse was rebuilt; since 1998 the Kretinga Estate Park Friends Club has been a co-sponsor.

== Exhibits and expositions ==
Logo of the Kretinga Museum

The exhibits portraying the life of the Tyszkiewicz family occupy seven halls, and contain family portraits, furniture, photographs, household objects, and paintings. The folk art exhibits contain textile art and works of Lithuanian cross crafters. Household articles include tools and furniture used during various eras.

Recent exhibitions have featured jewelry, ceramics, printed matter of historic interest, and folk costumes. The gardens and the orangery, which contains a cafe, are frequently updated. The museum sponsors concerts, scientific and research projects, holiday specials, a "Tree Feast", and folk dance presentations.

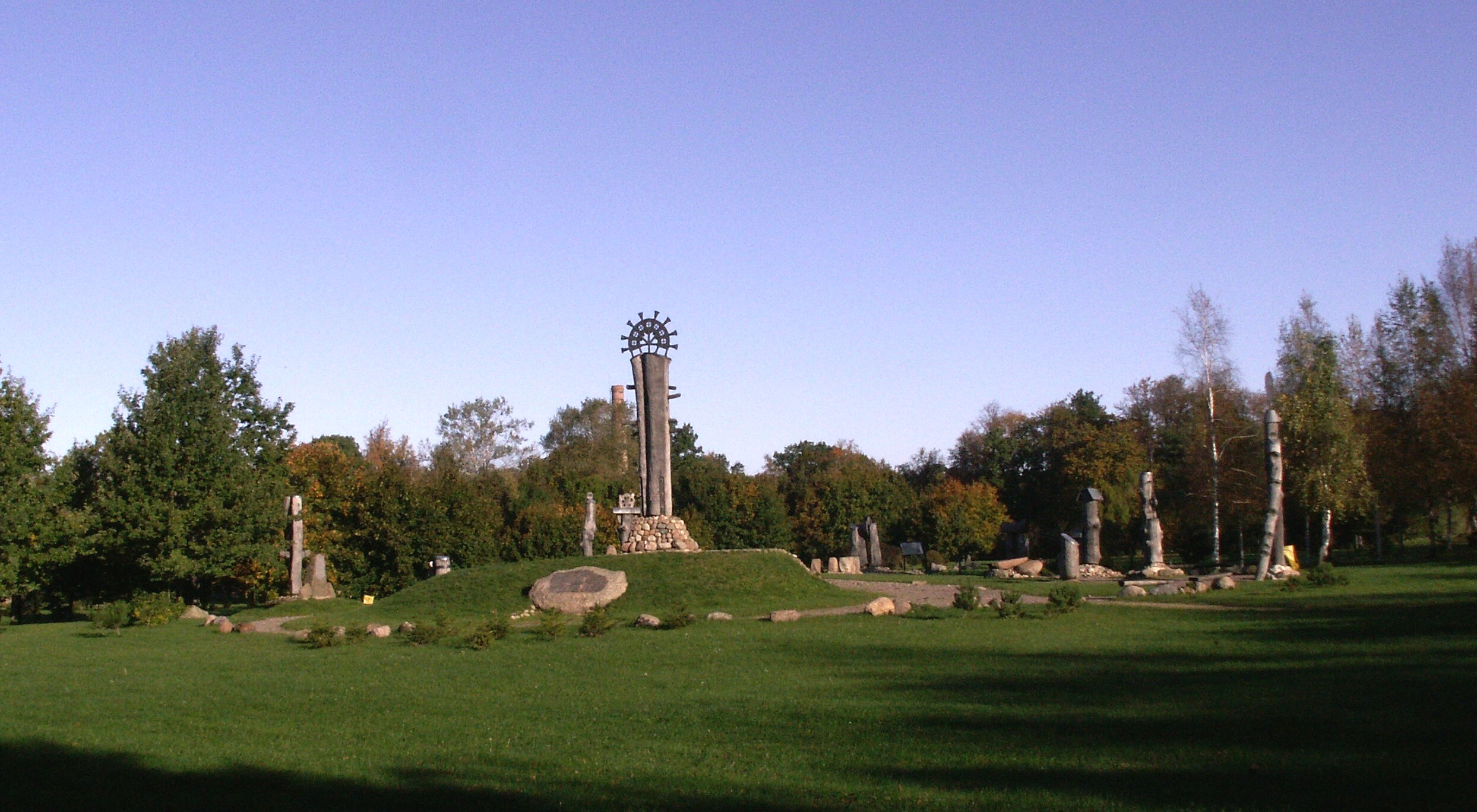
A sculpture garden nearby the museum
