= Galvė =

Lake in Trakai, Lithuania

Lake Galvė
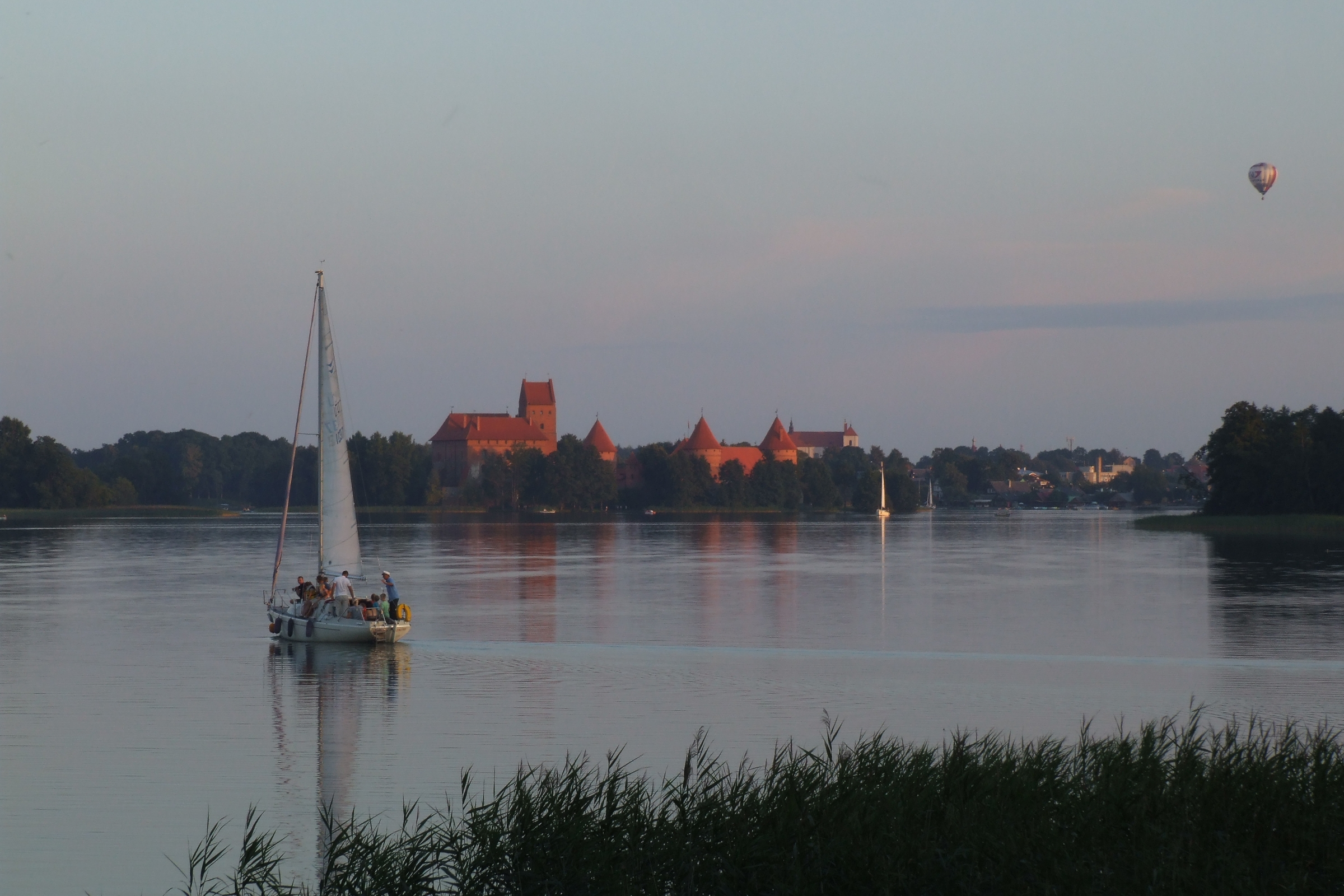
- Lake Galvė - view from Totoriškės village

- Location within Lithuania
- Location: Trakai, Lithuania
- Coordinates: 54°39′36″N 24°55′48″E
- Basin countries: Lithuania
- Surface area: 3.61 km^{2} (1.39 mi^{2})
- Max. depth: 46.7 m (153 ft)
- Islands: 21 (Trakai Island Castle)

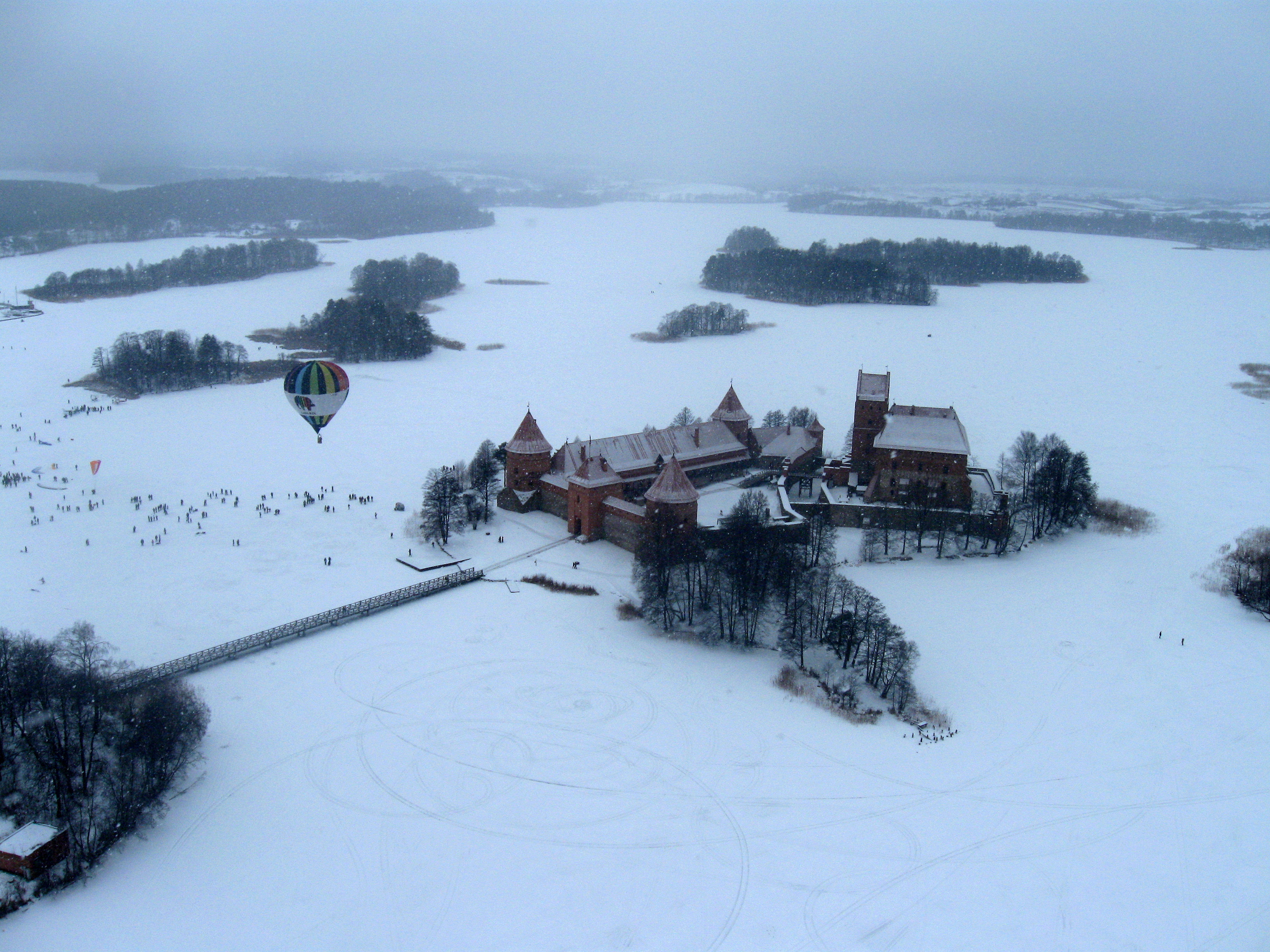
Frozen Lake Galvė

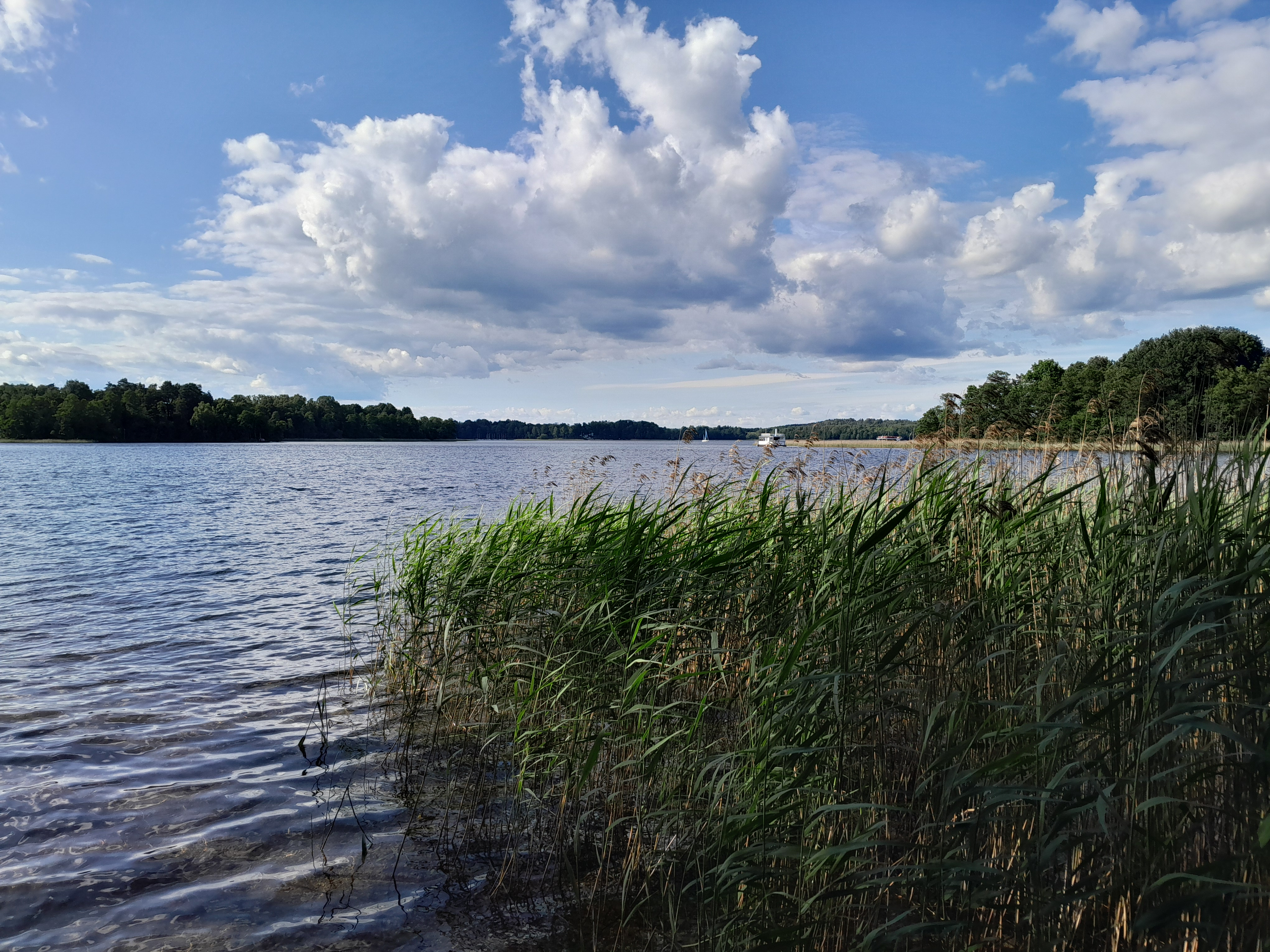
Lake in the summer

Lake Galvė is a lake in Trakai, Lithuania. Approximately 361 hectares in size, it has 21 islands, with one of them housing Trakai Island Castle. Trakai Peninsula Castle is located on its southern shore. There are ruins of the little Orthodox church in Bažnytėlė Island. The lake and most of the other lakes surrounding the castle and city have myths and legends connected to them, of which most contain a tragic love story.
