= Church of the Lord's Revelation to Virgin Mary, Kretinga =

Roman Catholic church in Kretinga, Lithuania built in 1617

Church of the Lord's Revelation to Virgin Mary Viešpaties Apreiškimo Švč. Mergelei Marijai bažnyčia
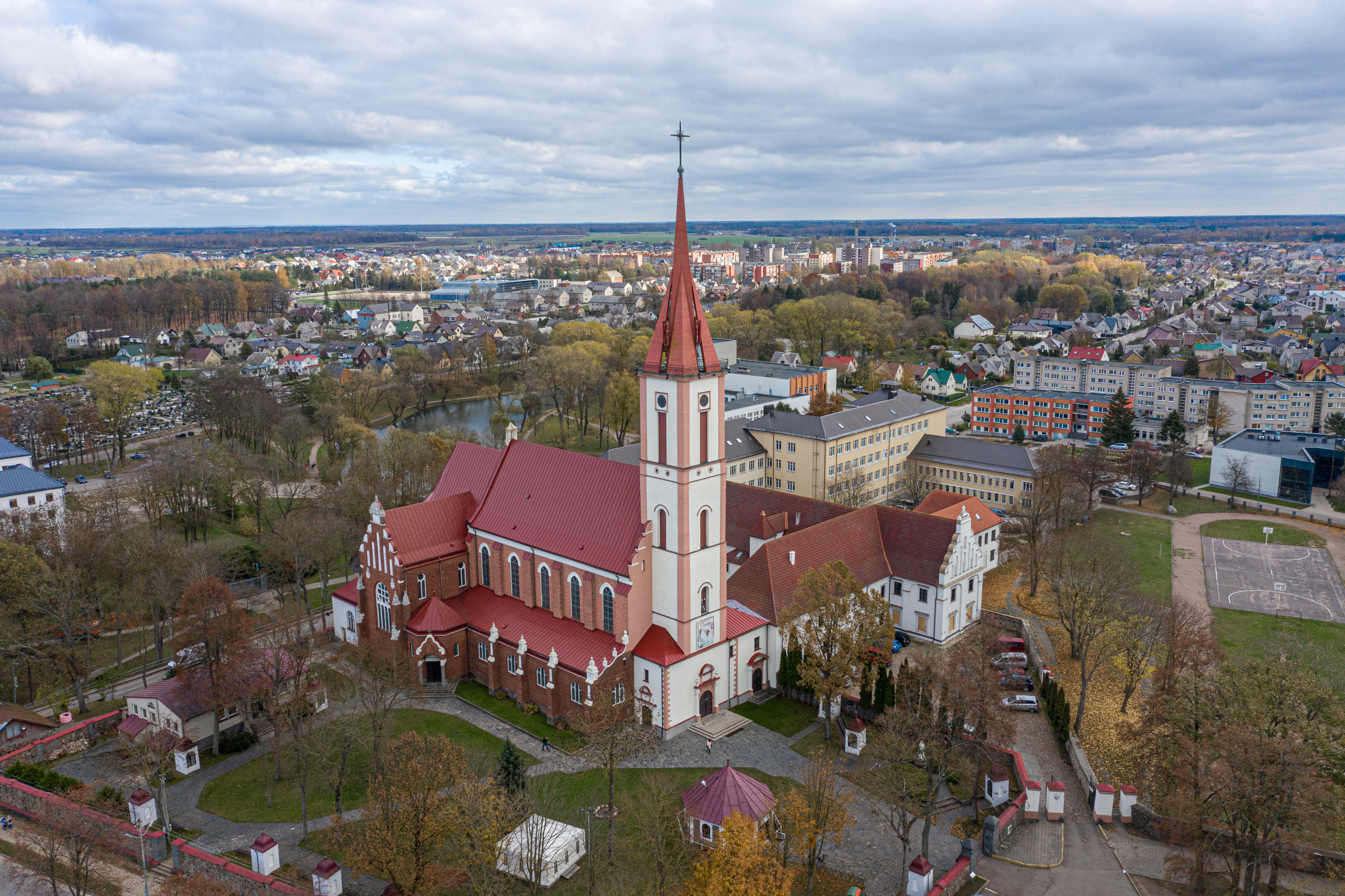
- Aerial view of the church and nearby Bernardine Monastery

Religion
- Affiliation: Roman Catholic
- Leadership: Roman Catholic Diocese of Telšiai
- Year consecrated: 7 July 1619

Location
- Location: Kretinga, Lithuania
- Interactive map of Church of the Lord's Revelation to Virgin Mary; Viešpaties Apreiškimo Švč. Mergelei Marijai bažnyčia
- Coordinates: 55°53′31.19″N 21°14′33.96″E

Architecture
- Architects: Sławomir Odrzywolski (20th century reconstruction), Margarita Ramanauskienė and Vytautas Šliogeris (spire reconstruction, 20th century)
- Type: Church
- Style: Gothic and Renaissance
- Completed: 1617
- Spire height: 70 meters

The Church of the Lord's Revelation to Virgin Mary (Lithuanian: Viešpaties Apreiškimo Švč. Mergelei Marijai bažnyčia) is a Roman Catholic church in Kretinga, Lithuania. The Kretinga Bernardine Monastery building is connected with the church. The construction of the church and monastery complex in 1610–1617 was financed by Jan Karol Chodkiewicz, the Grand Hetman of Lithuania, while the consecration of the church was performed by Stanisław Kiszka, the Bishop of Samogitia.

In 1672, a spire was added to the church, however the spire was destroyed during the World War II in 1941, therefore it was restored according to a project by Margarita Ramanauskienė and Vytautas Šliogeris in 1981–1982.

== Gallery ==
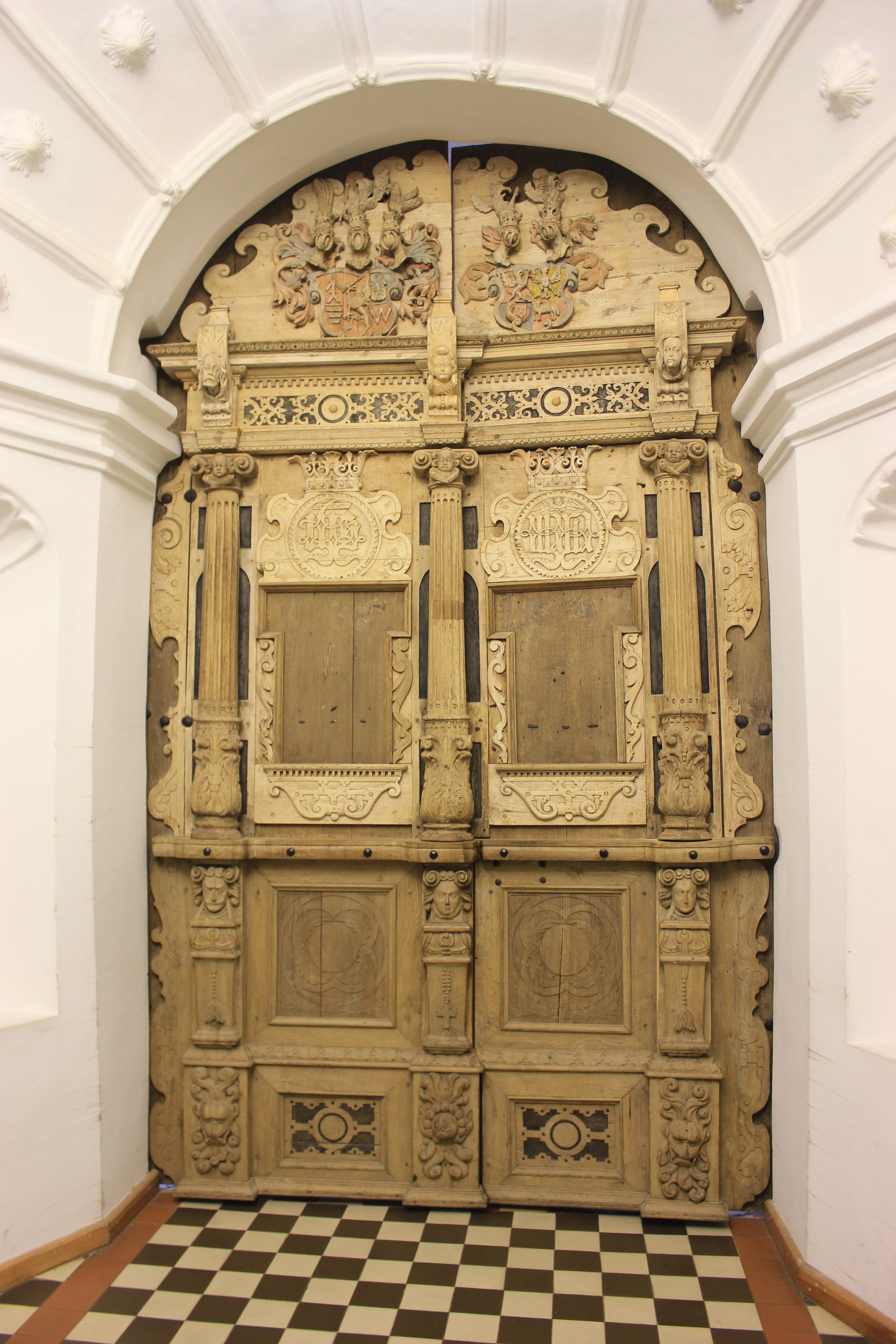
Main entrance doors

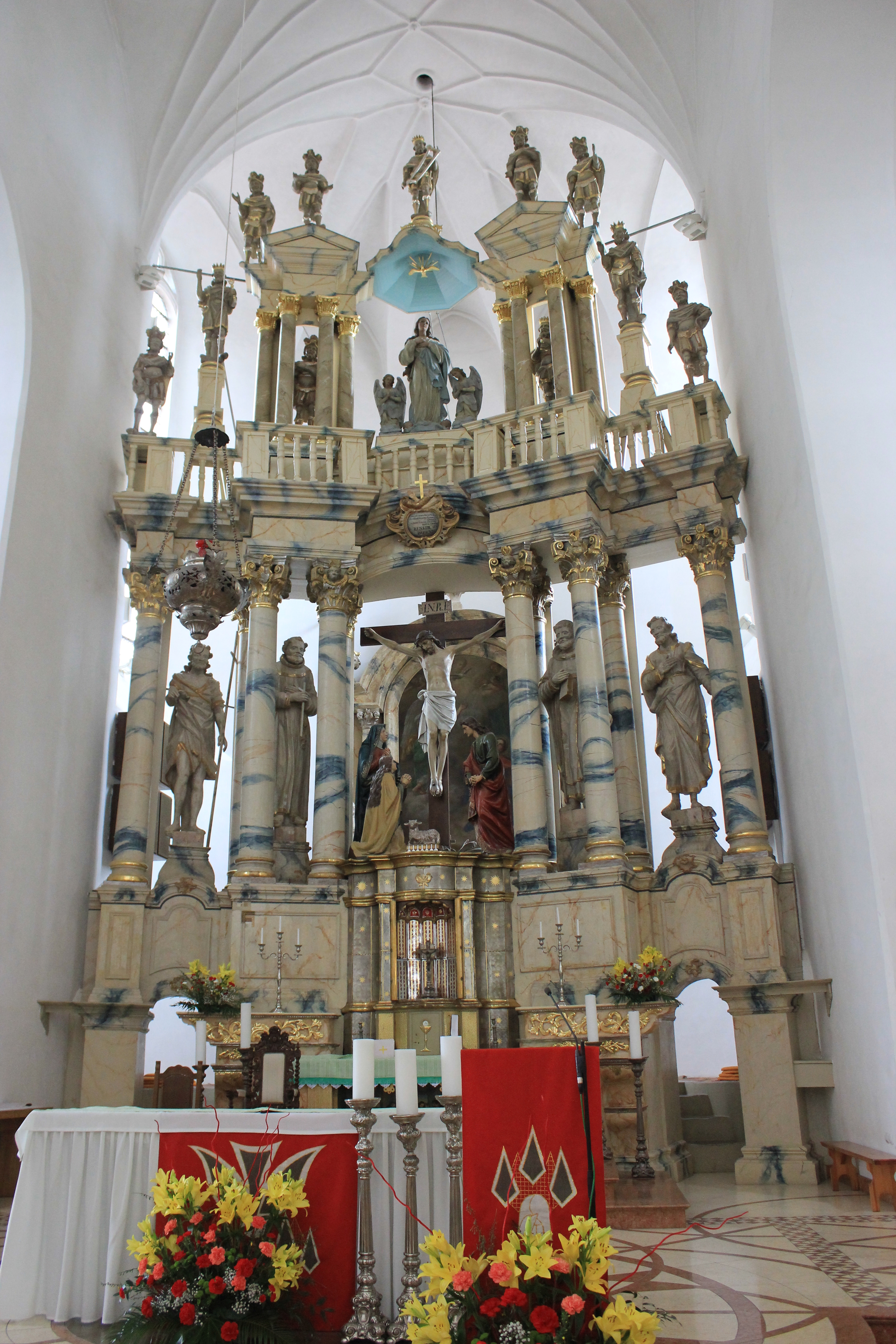
Main altar in the church

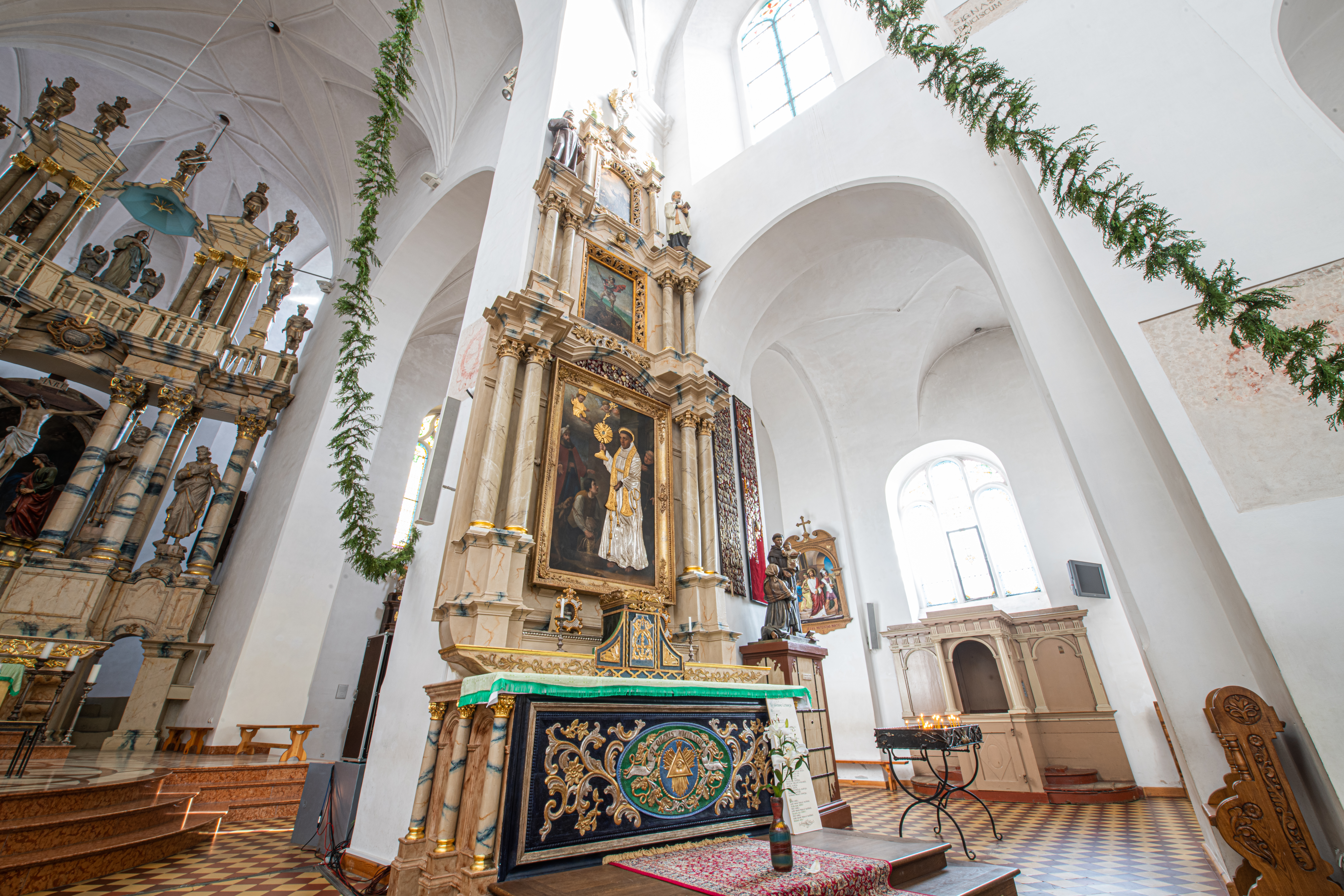
Side altar in the church

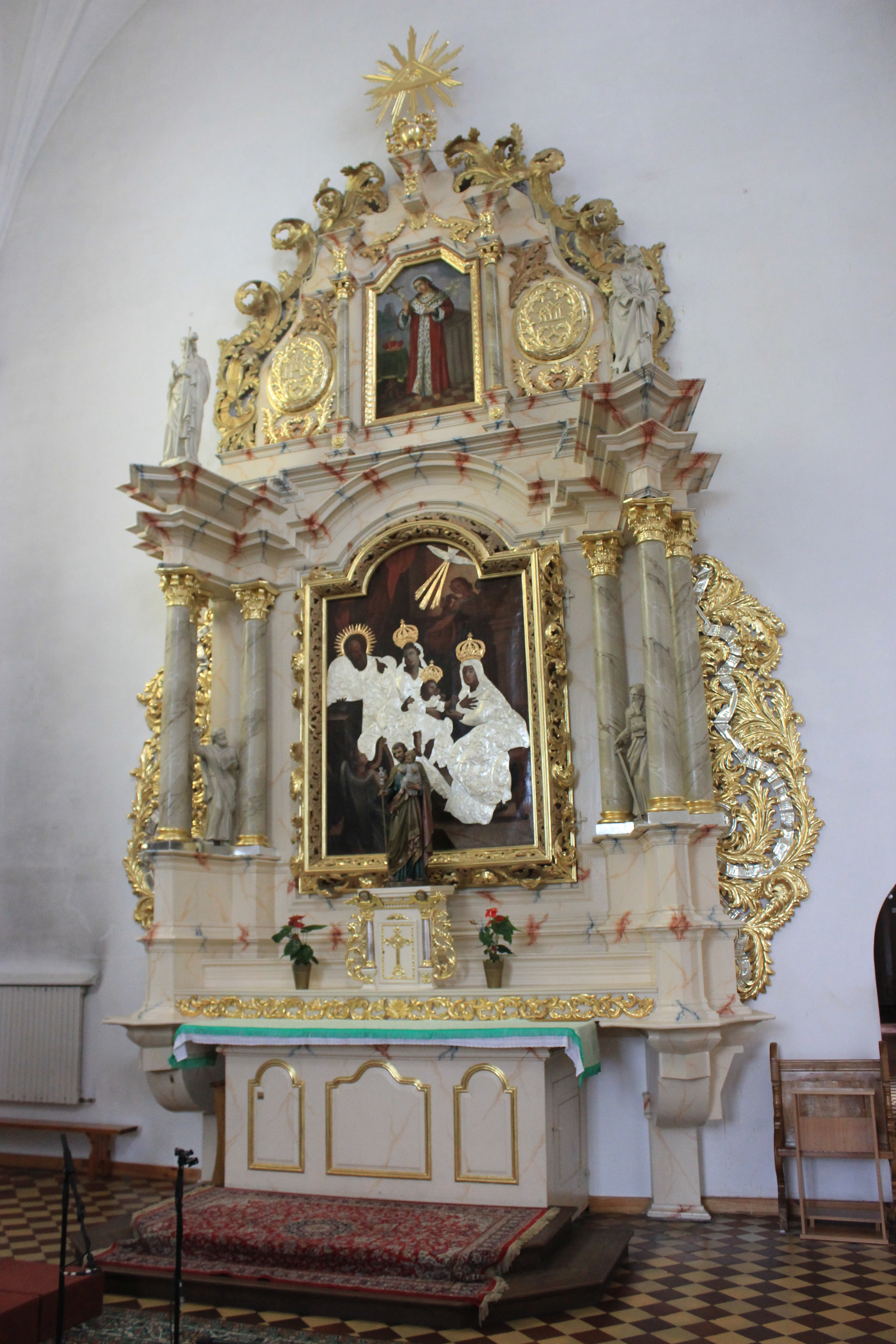
Side altar in the church

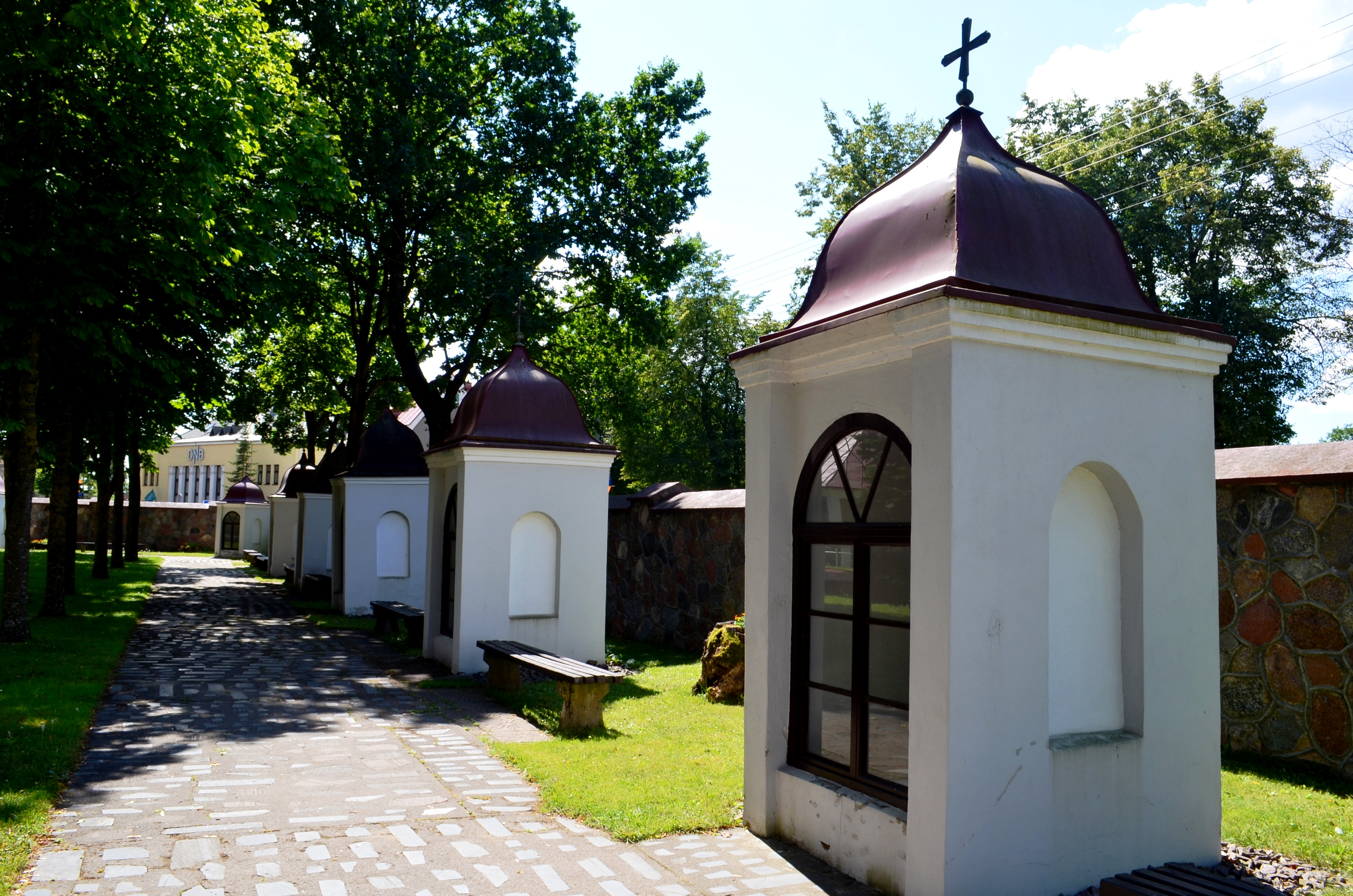
Stations of the Cross

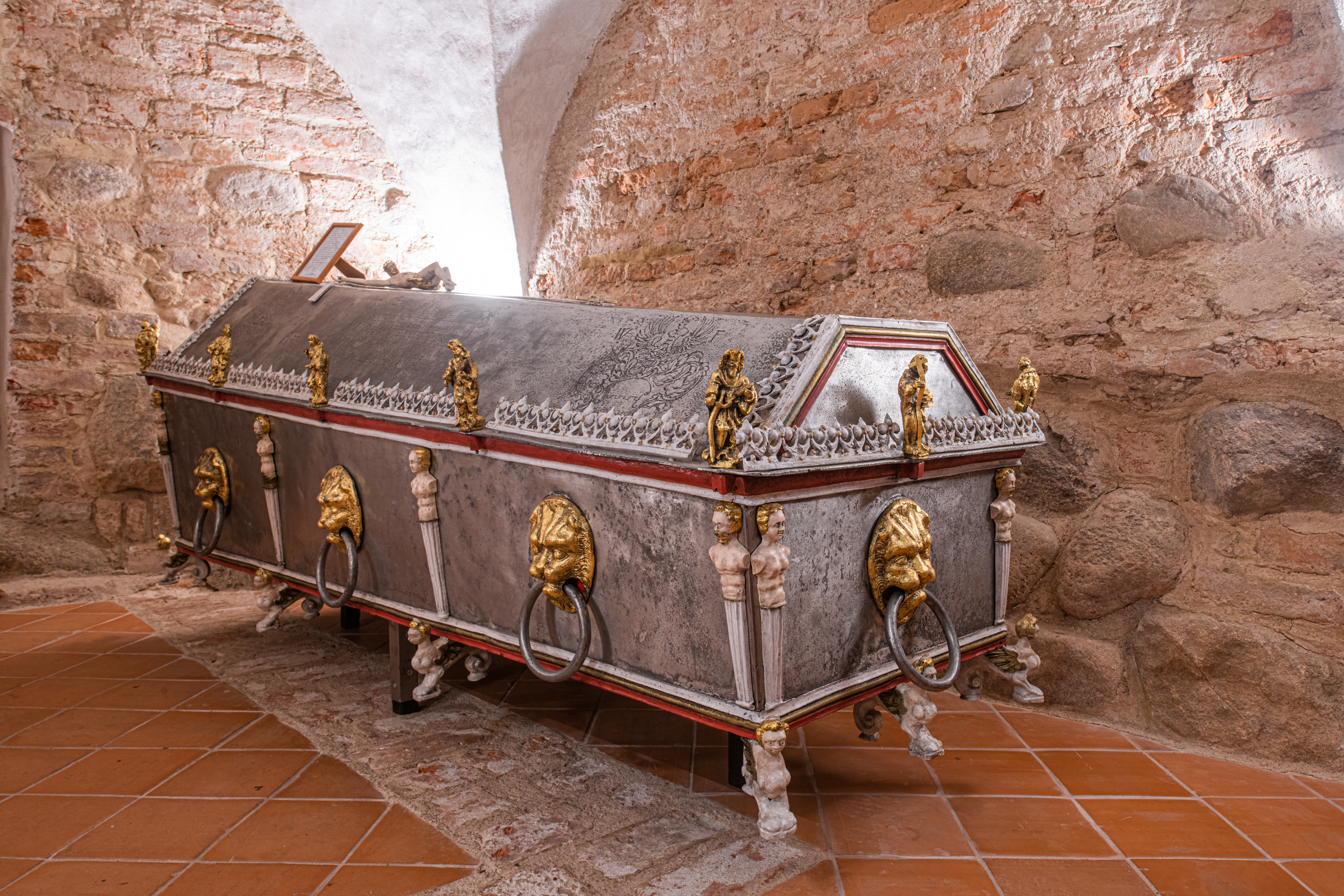
Sarcophagus of the Chodkiewicz family
