= Vladas Petronaitis =

Lithuanian military officer

Vladas Petronaitis (November 2, 1888 – June 25, 1941) was a Lithuanian military officer. He was tortured and executed in the infamous Rainiai massacre by members of the NKVD.

== Early life and education ==
Petronaitis was born on November 2, 1888, to a family of Petras Petronaitis, a well-to-do farmer, in Plauciškiai village, Rozalimas Volost, Ponevezhsky Uyezd, Kovno Governorate. The village was at that time part of the Russian Empire as a result of the partition of the Polish–Lithuanian Commonwealth in 1795.

The family's circumstances were good and, after the graduation from the Gymnasium of Mitava, he studied mathematics and science at the Saint Petersburg State University. In Saint Petersburg, he shared a house with his friend Ignas Končius. In those days, many prominent Lithuanians studied in St. Petersburg, then the capital of the Russian Empire, including the future Lithuanian President Antanas Smetona and Prime Minister Augustinas Voldemaras.

After graduating in 1913, he remained in Saint Petersburg and, at the outbreak of World War I, was teaching mathematics. Like many young Lithuanians, he was drafted into the Russian Army. In 1915, he was stationed in Jaroslavl near Moscow. Heavy Russian casualties in the war forced the Russian Army to set aside long-standing discrimination against Catholic Lithuanian soldiers. In 1916, Petronaitis was promoted to officer rank and became a teaching fellow at a Moscow military officers' school. At the same time he studied law at Moscow University.

== Army service and lawyer career ==
Following the Russian Revolution of 1917, he made his way back to Lithuania, which had regained its independence in 1918. He became an officer in the Lithuanian Army with an infantry battalion and later with an electricity technical battalion in Vilnius. In 1920, he was promoted to Commandant of Vilnius and played a significant role in securing Vilnius against the Poles and the Soviet Union. For his military and organisational service in securing the city, the President of Lithuania, Antanas Smetona, conferred on him the medal of the Order of the Cross of Vytis for the "establishment of Vilnius City and County Commandant Institution".

Following the Polish seizure of the Vilnius region, he was appointed Commandant in Kretinga. He married Bronislava Kentraite in a ceremony at Palanga in 1922. Bronislava's father, Jonas Kentra, was a public notary in Palanga. In 1923, Petronaitis was discharged to the army reserve and settled down in Kretinga working as a lawyer and advocate and supporting various Lithuanian patriotic activities. Like many other Lithuanians, he received the Independence Medal.

== Arrest and murder ==
Lithuania was occupied by the Soviet Union in June 1940, and a puppet Communist government was installed in the newly created Lithuanian SSR. Within days, Petronaitis was arrested by the NKVD and imprisoned in the Telšiai prison. In spite of his imprisonment, and long interrogation over many months, he protested his innocence and denied any wrongdoing.

On June 22, 1941, Nazi Germany began its invasion of the Soviet Union. With the Soviet troops in a rout, the NKVD began executing its political prisoners as they retreated. On the night of 24/25 June 1941, Petronaitis was taken to a forest near Rainiai and, together with 77 other political prisoners, was tortured, murdered, and buried in a mass grave. On exhumation three days later, his body was difficult to identify as it had been disfigured by the tortures applied to it.

A memorial is built on the place with graphic photographs of the exhumation and the exhumed body of Petronaitis.
