= Kretinga Bernardine Monastery =

Oldest monastery in northern Lithuania

Bernardine Monastery
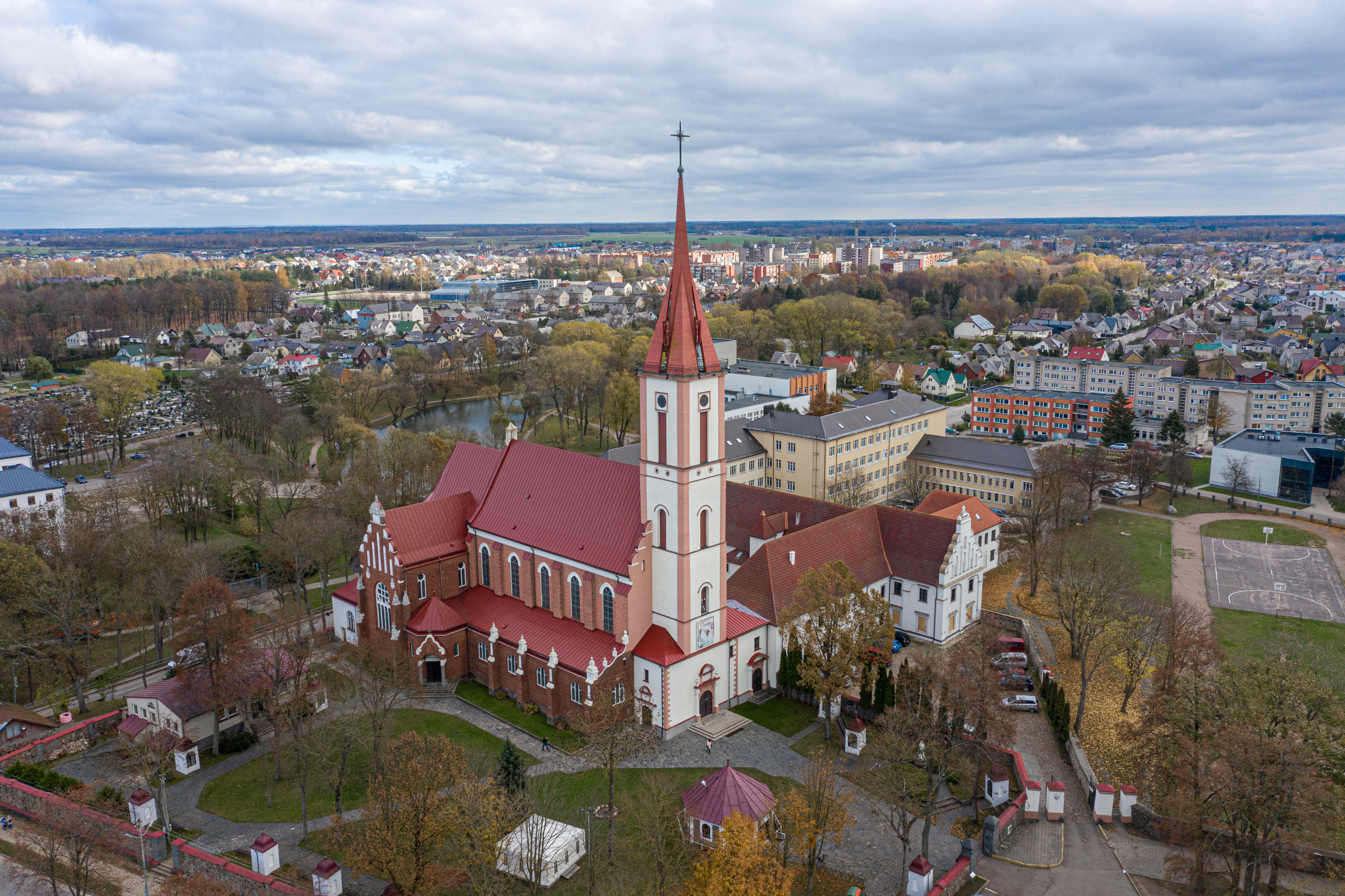
- Aerial view of the monastery and church
- Interactive map of the Bernardine Monastery area

General information
- Location: Kretinga, Lithuania
- Coordinates: 55.891997°N 21.242767°E

The Bernardine Monastery in Kretinga, Lithuania is the oldest monastery in Northern Lithuania. The monastery building is connected with the Church of the Lord's Revelation to Virgin Mary. The masonry buildings of the monastery and the church were built in 1605–1617. They were sponsored by a nobleman of the Polish–Lithuanian Commonwealth, Jan Karol Chodkiewicz, on his wife's initiative, and the development of the whole town of Kretinga is directly tied to the establishment of the Bernardine monastery.

== History ==
The monastery and the church were raided by the Swedish army in 1659 and again in 1710; however, the post-Chodkiewicz ruler of Kretinga – Kazimieras Povilas Jonas Sapieha – took care of repairing the buildings and renewed the altar of the church. In 1907–1912 the church was rebuilt, two side naves were annexed and a spacious masonry transept was built, as well as a new wooden tower.

In the early 19th century, priests who had been condemned by the Czar of Russia settled there, along with the monks of other monasteries that had closed. However, the cultural significance of the monastery grew in the 20th century, when a modern school was built in the inter-war period: St. Anthony's Mission College, St. Anthony's Palace. At that time, the monastery had its own press and book bindery, a wealthy library and even a movie theatre; therefore, it was considered to be the administrative and spiritual centre for Lithuania's Franciscans.

In mid-20th century, the church was damaged by the fire and was also partially damaged during World War II. Finally, the Soviet government confiscated the property and limited the church's activities. In 2008, the church building complex was declared as a state-protected cultural monument.

== Architecture ==
The Church of the Annunciation to the Blessed Virgin Mary mainly has Gothic and Renaissance features; however, Baroque characteristics are also present. In total, seven altars were created in the church during the 17th to 18th centuries, with carvings, sculptures, a decorated pulpit and painting of St. Anthony. Within the church some of the oldest organs in Lithuania can be found, which have been dated to 1774. Under the central altar, members of the Chodkiewicz family, the founders of the church, are buried along with the Franciscan monks.

== Gallery ==
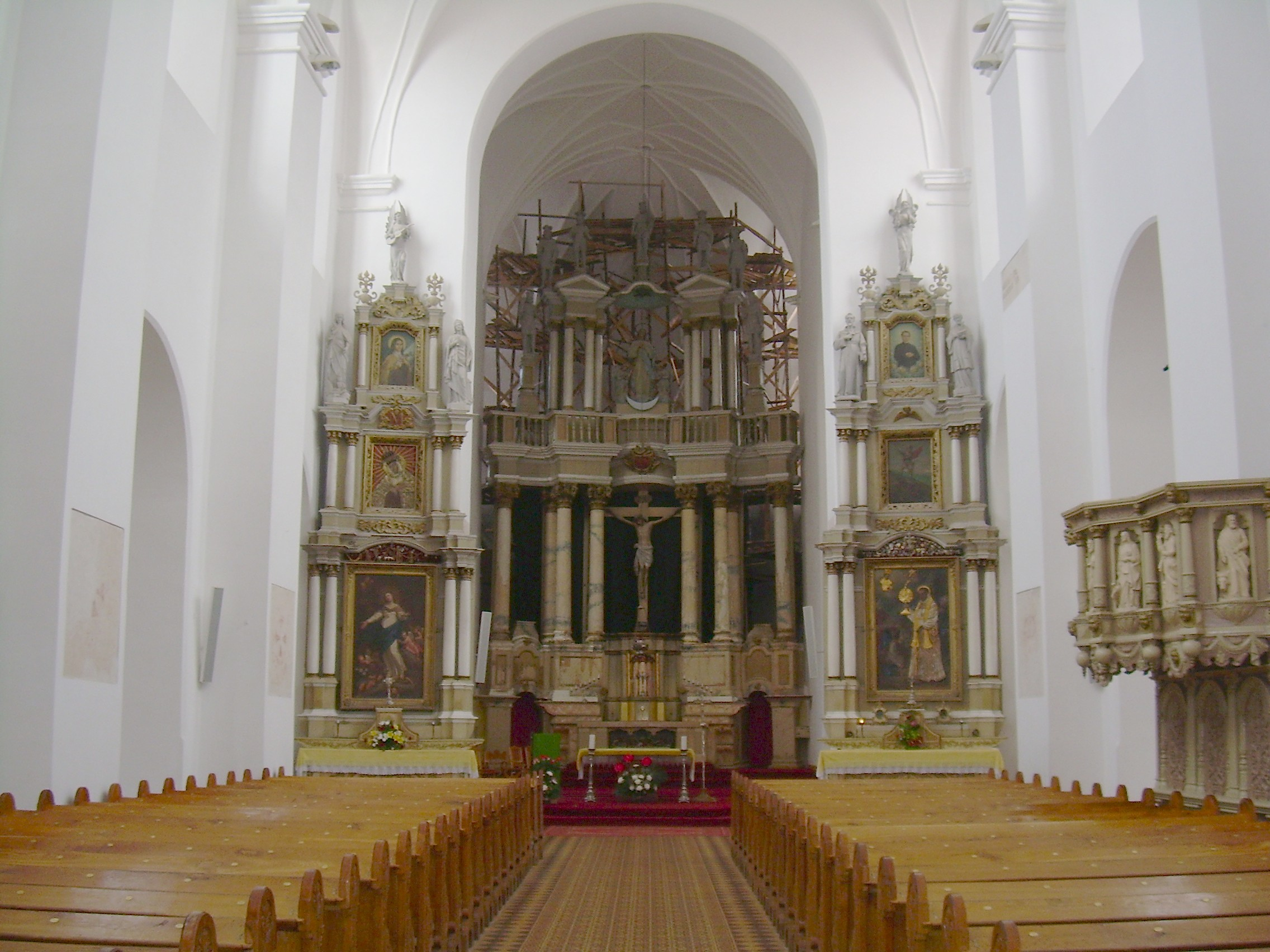
Main altar in the church

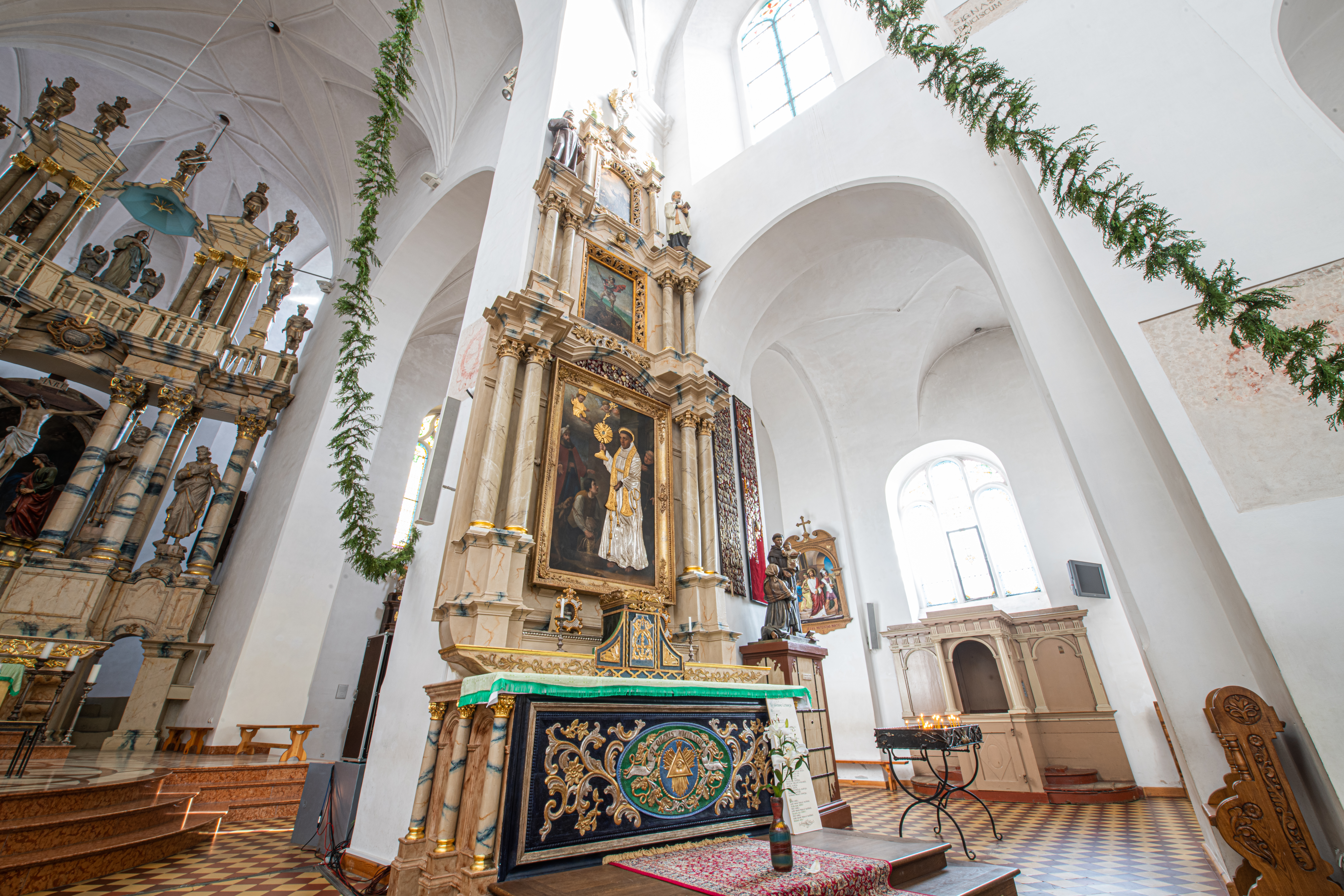
Side altar in the church

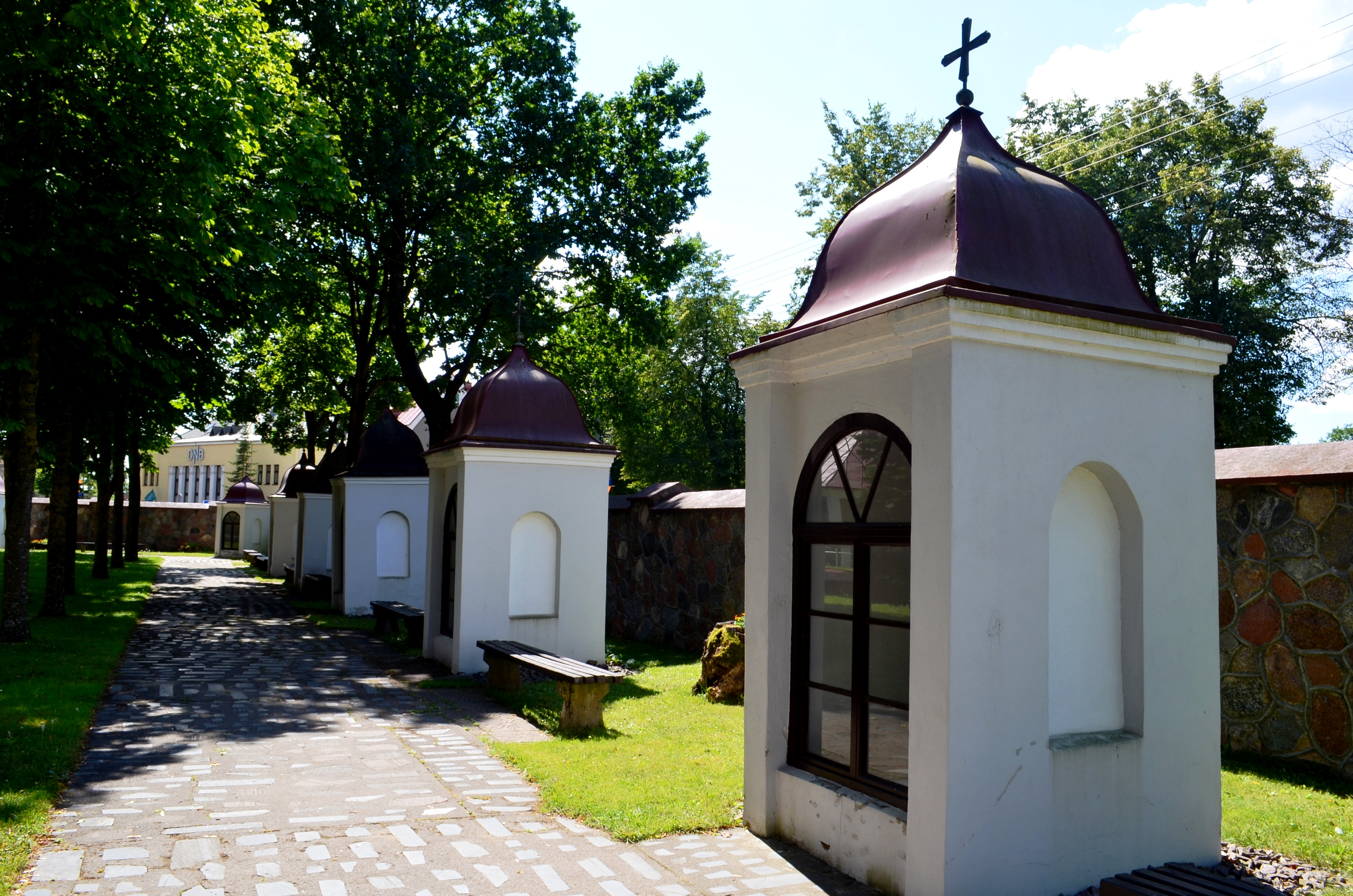
Stations of the Cross

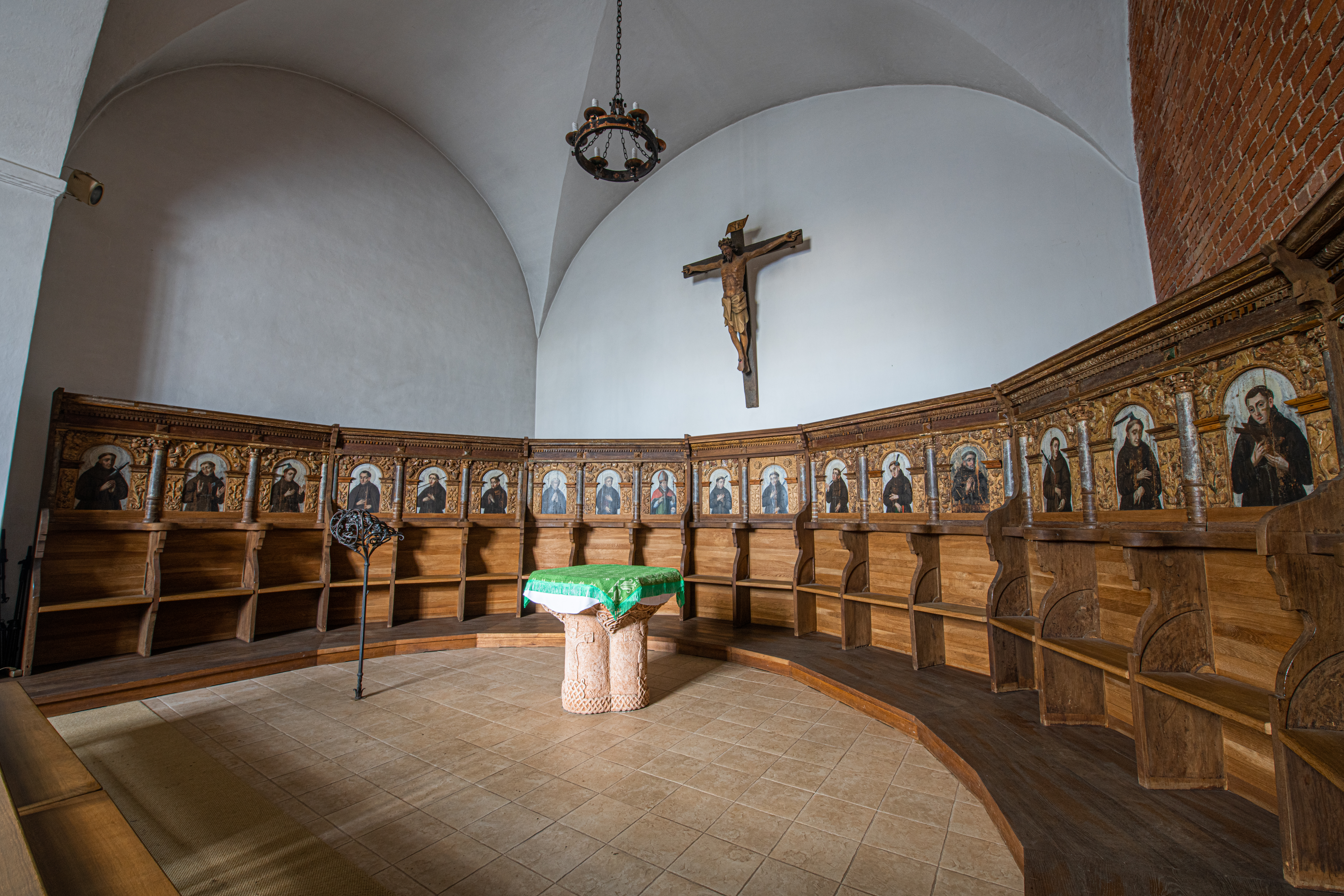
Interior of the monastery

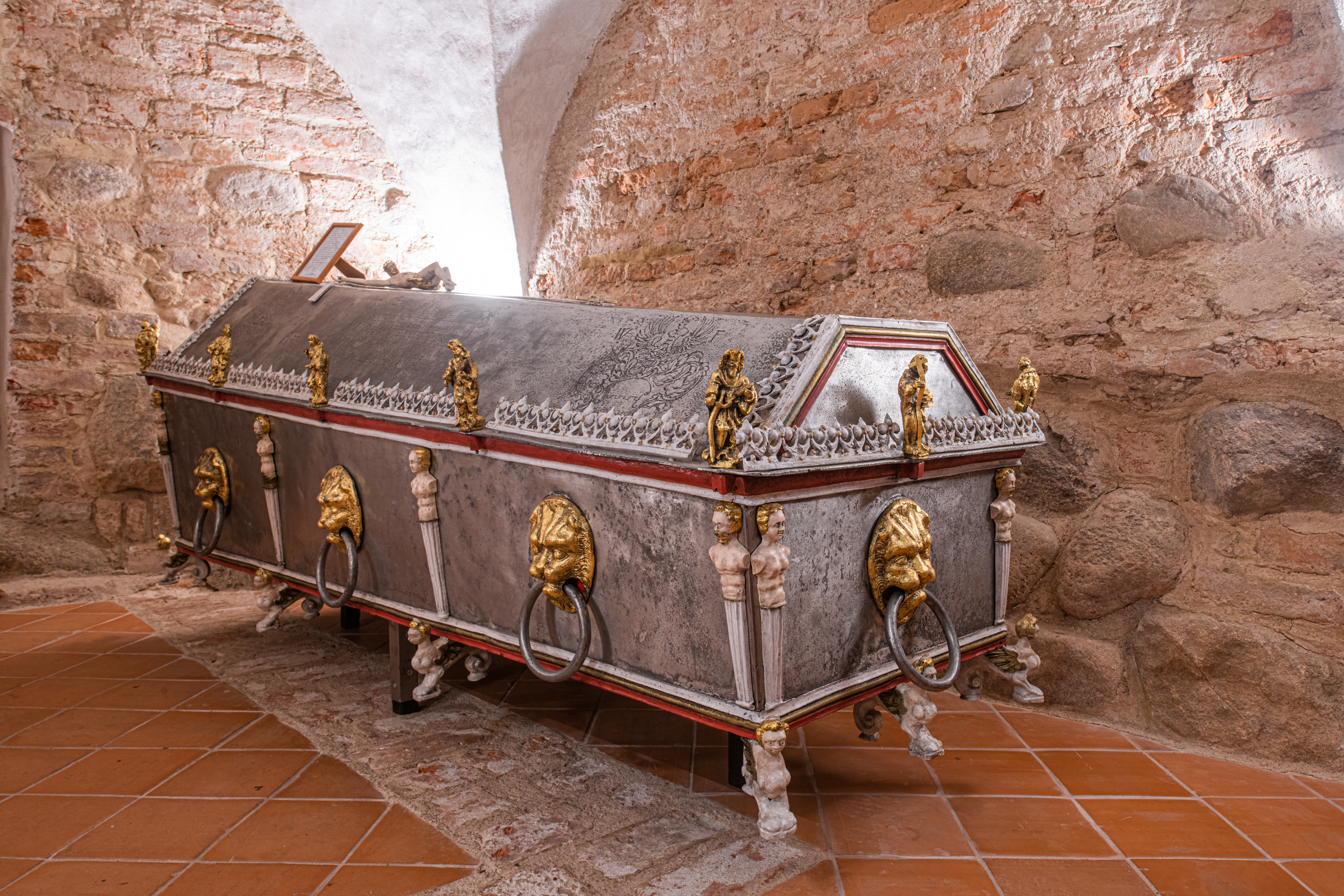
Sarcophagus of the Chodkiewicz family
