= Jurgis Pabrėža Grave Chapel =

Chapel in Lithuania

Jurgis Ambroziejus Pabrėža Grave Chapel
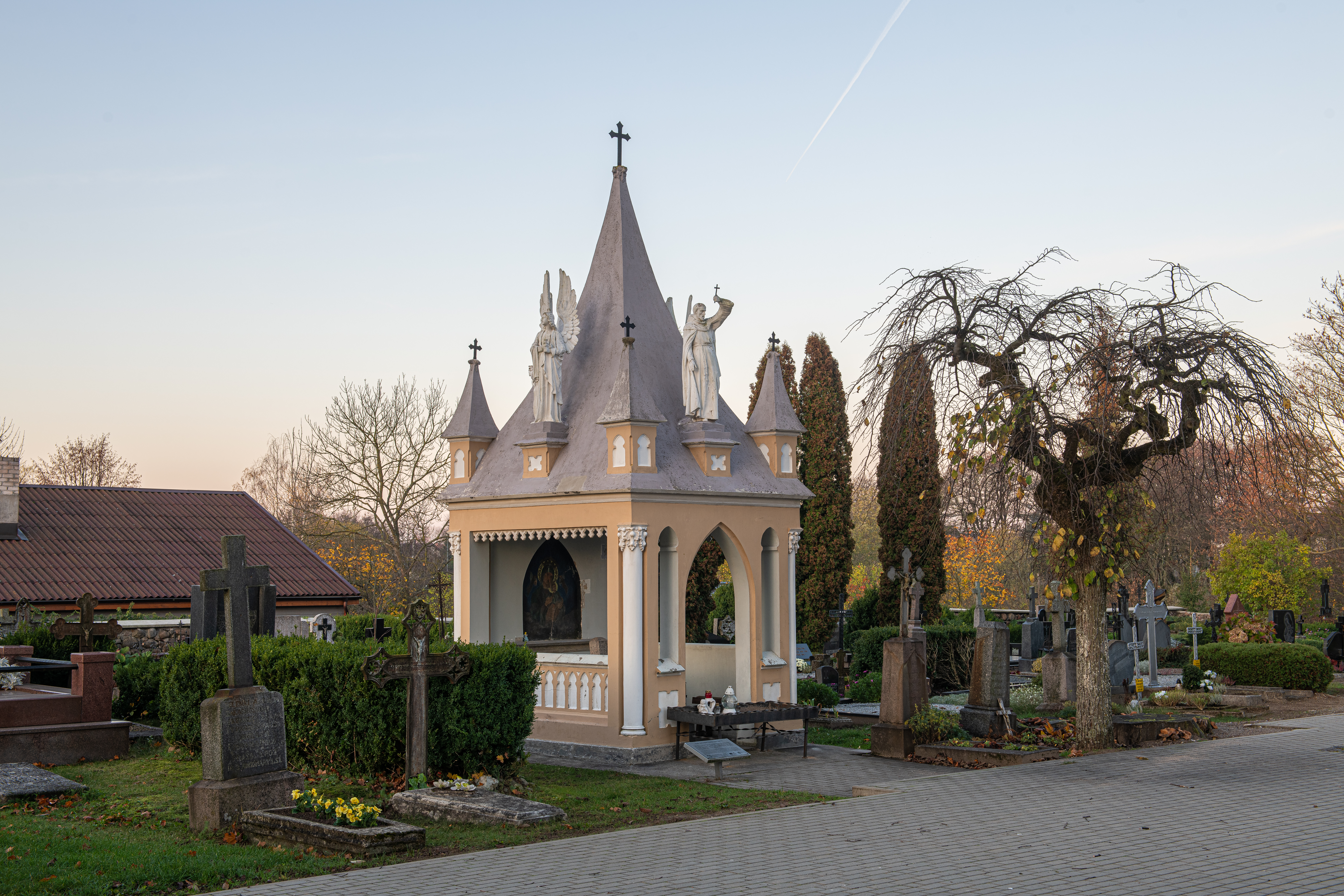
- Interactive map of the Jurgis Ambroziejus Pabrėža Grave Chapel area

General information
- Location: Kretinga, Lithuania
- Coordinates: 55.891497°N 21.241883°E

Website
- www.

Jurgis Ambroziejus Pabrėža grave chapel is a small neo-Gothic masonry chapel above the grave of monk and botanist Jurgis Pabrėža in the old graveyard of Kretinga, Lithuania. It was built in 1933.

The shape of the chapel's roof is like a pyramid with four slopes, in the corners there are four rectangular pyramidal four-sloped turrets with iron crosses at their tops, while between the turrets four concrete sculptures stand upon rectangular pedestals: St. Francis and the angels. In the interior of the chapel, there is a mural of "Virgin Mary the Eternal Saviour" by an unknown artist. The maintenance and restoration of the chapel was performed by sporadic craftsmen, and the painting within the chapel was painted over multiple times. In 1993, the Jurgis Ambroziejus Pabrėža Grave Chapel was added to the registry of cultural heritage objects.

Many people in Samogitia believe Pabrėža to be a saint. It is said that those who visit his grave sometimes experience miracles; thus, the candles in the chapel are kept lit all year round.

== Gallery ==
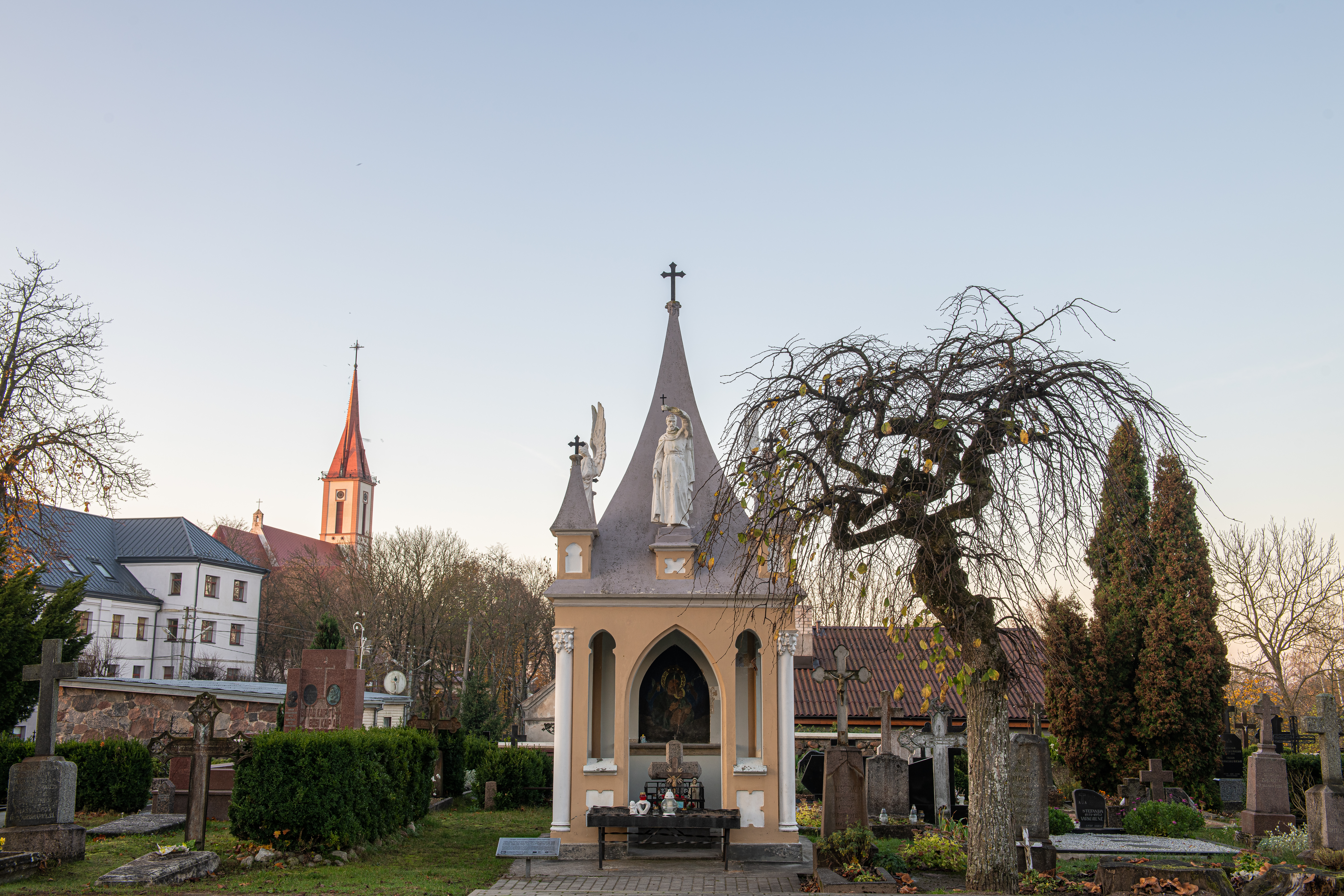

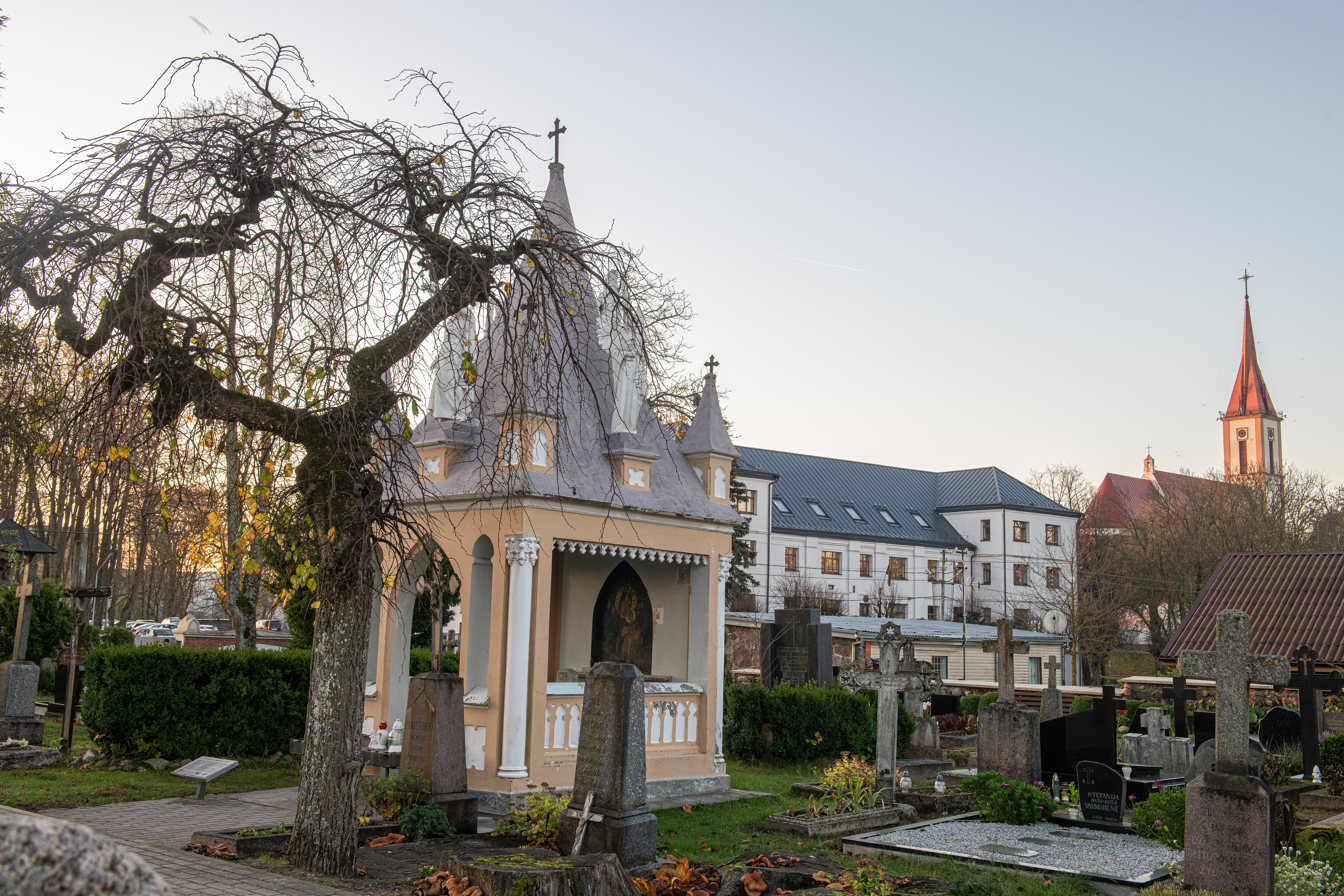

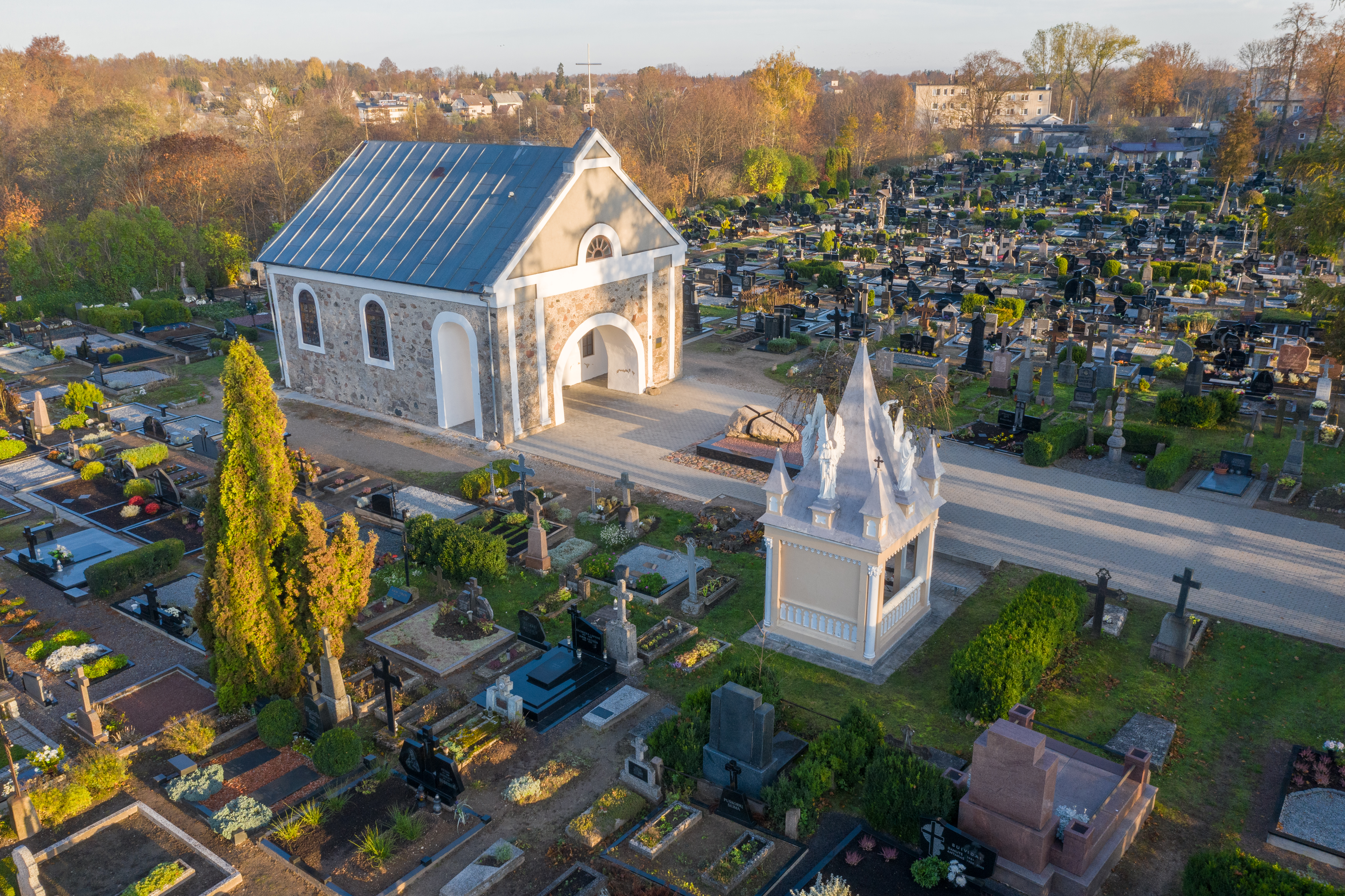

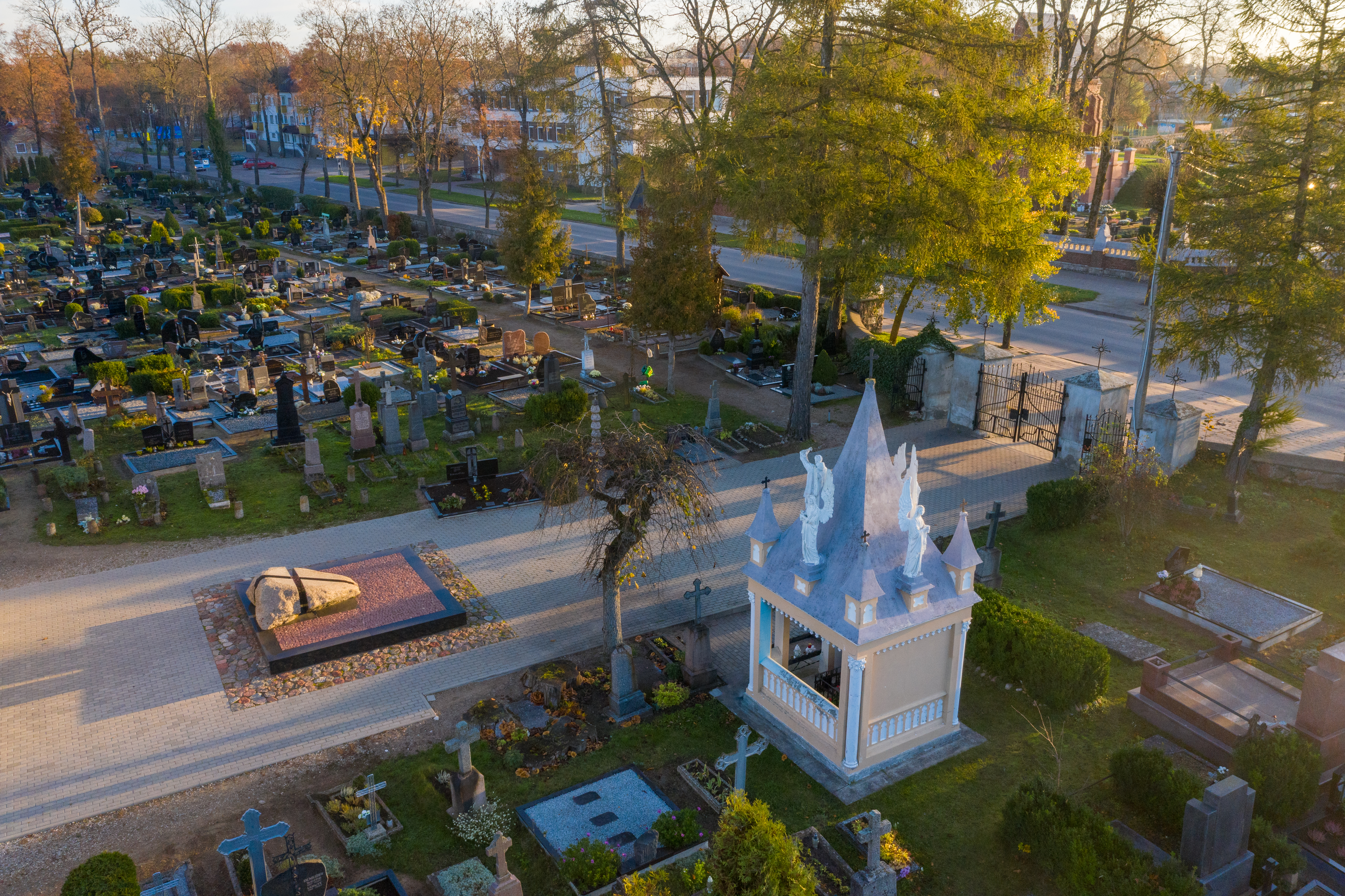

== Sources ==
- "Vienuolio Jurgio Ambrozijaus Pabrėžos kapo koplyčia | Žemai.lt". www.zemai.lt (in Lithuanian).
- "UAB Pajūrio naujienos". www.pajurionaujienos.lt.
- "Šventas Pabrėža - šventas Pranciškus". old.kretingospranciskonai.lt.
