= Kretinga =

- City
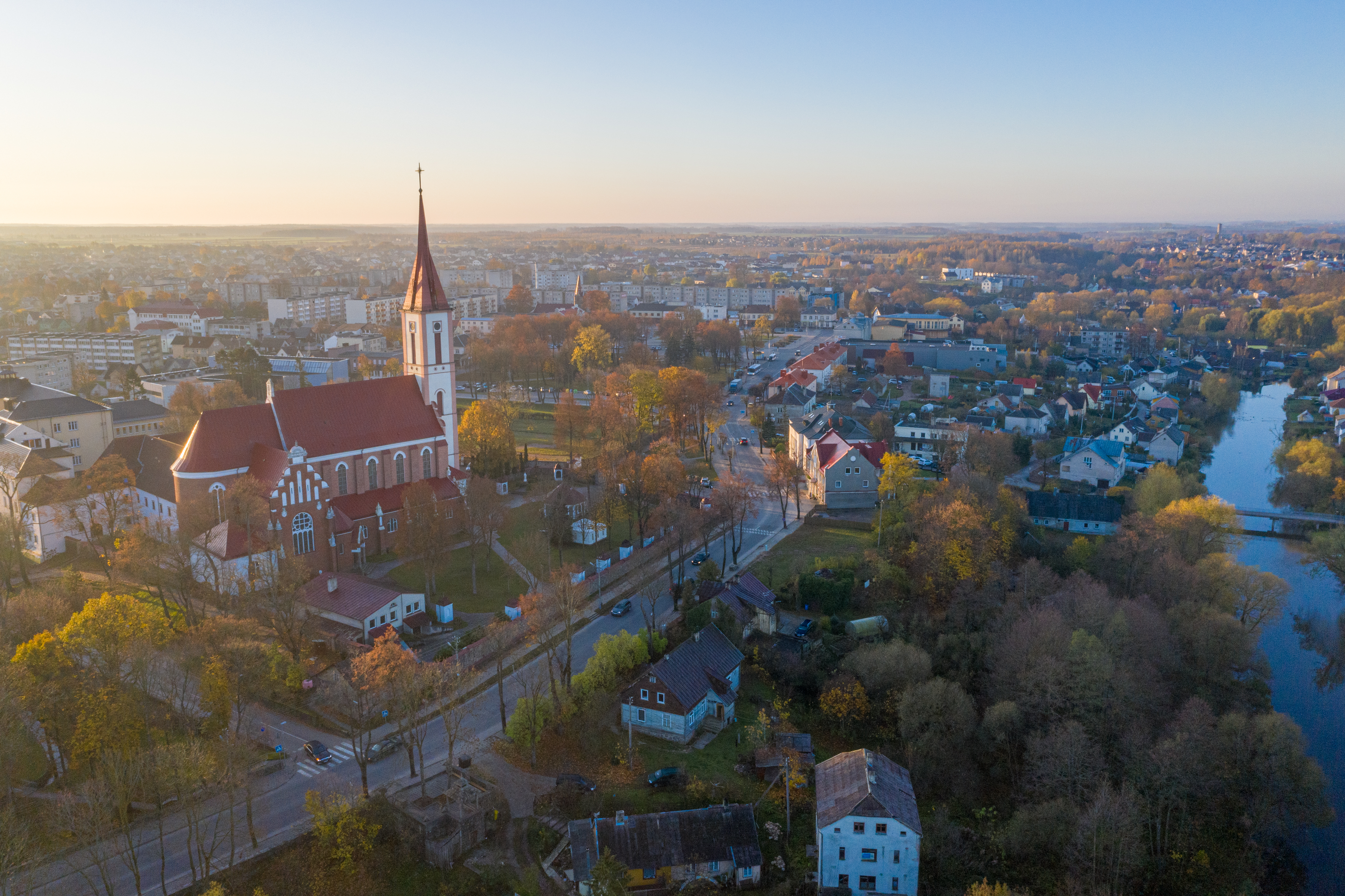
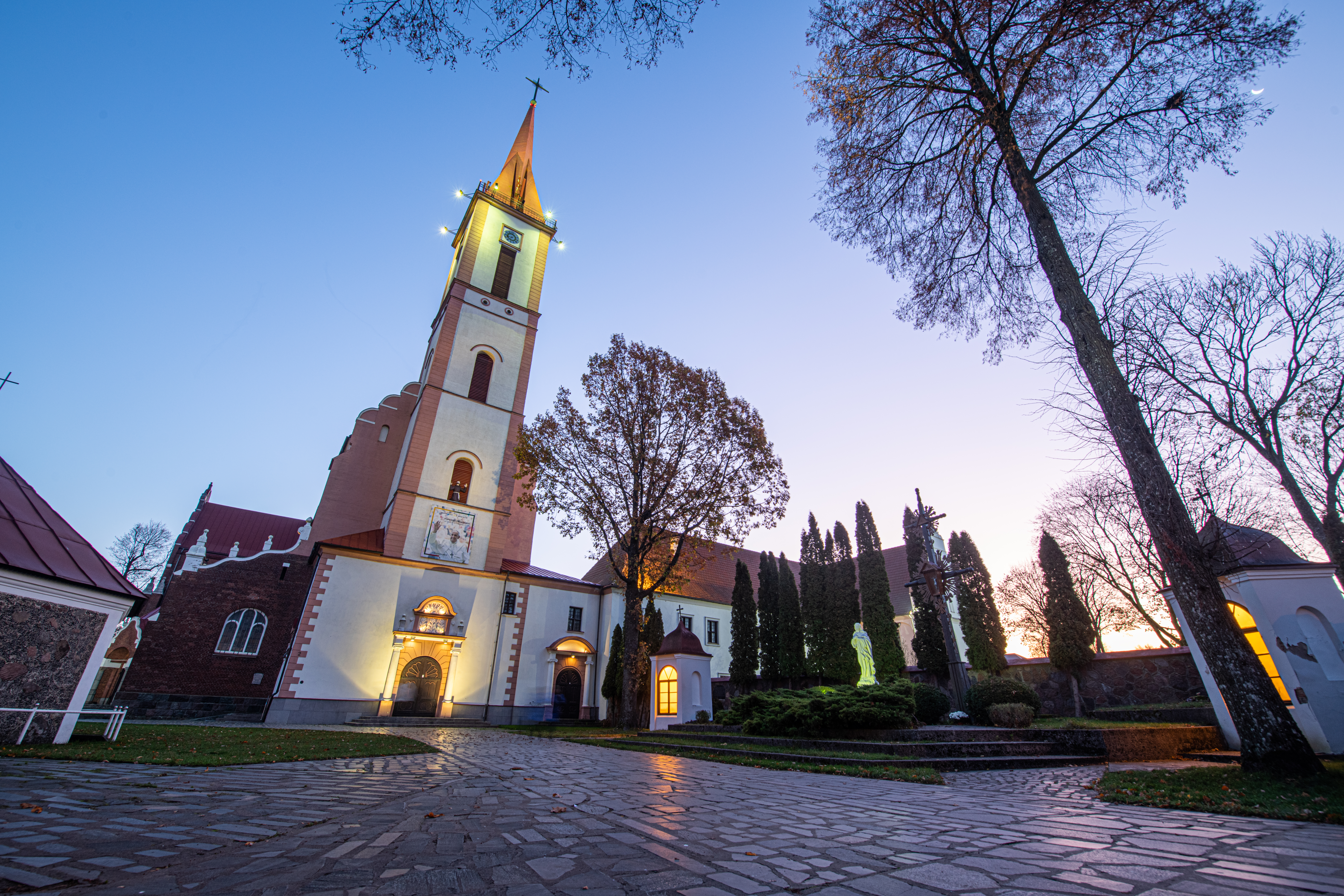
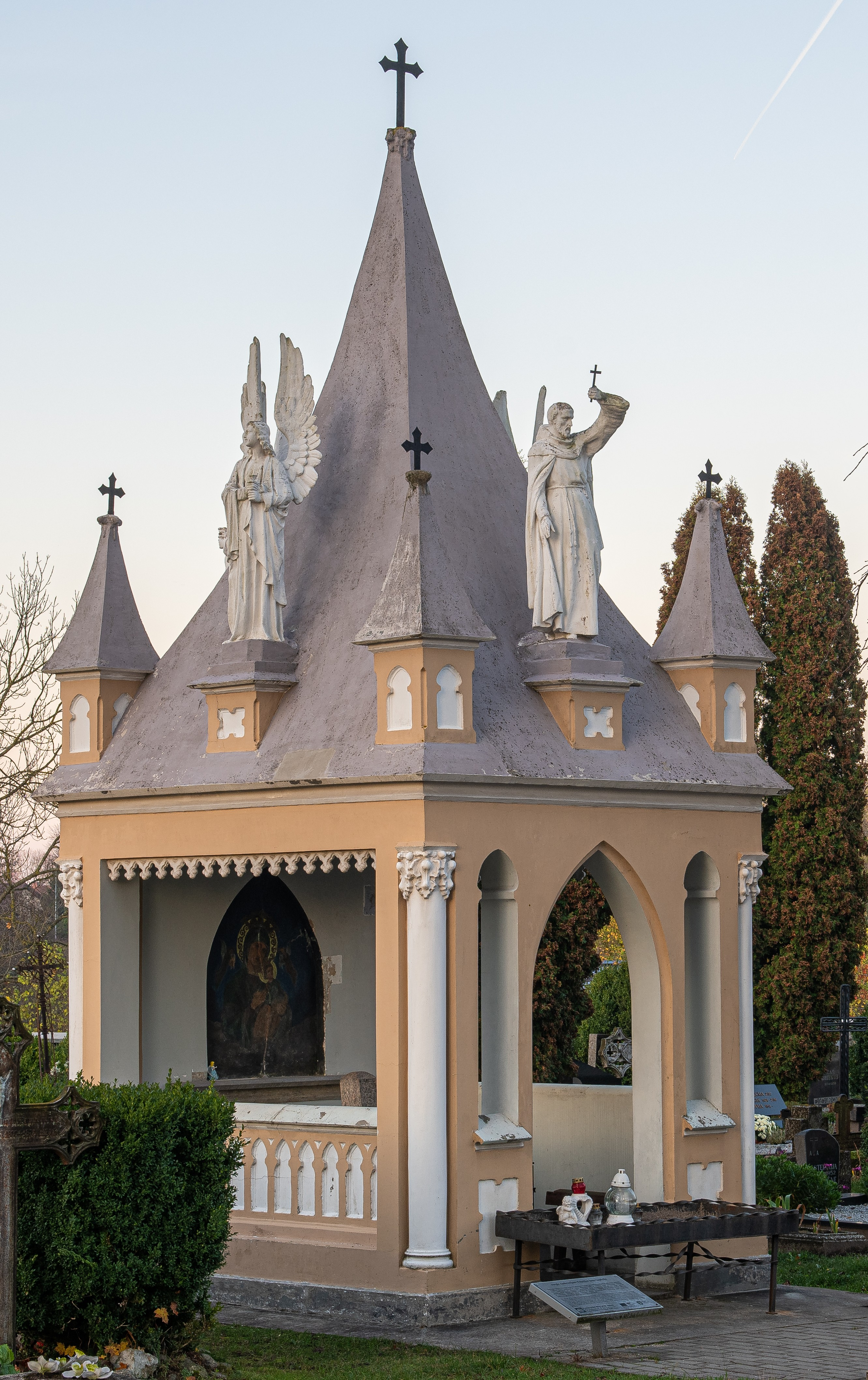
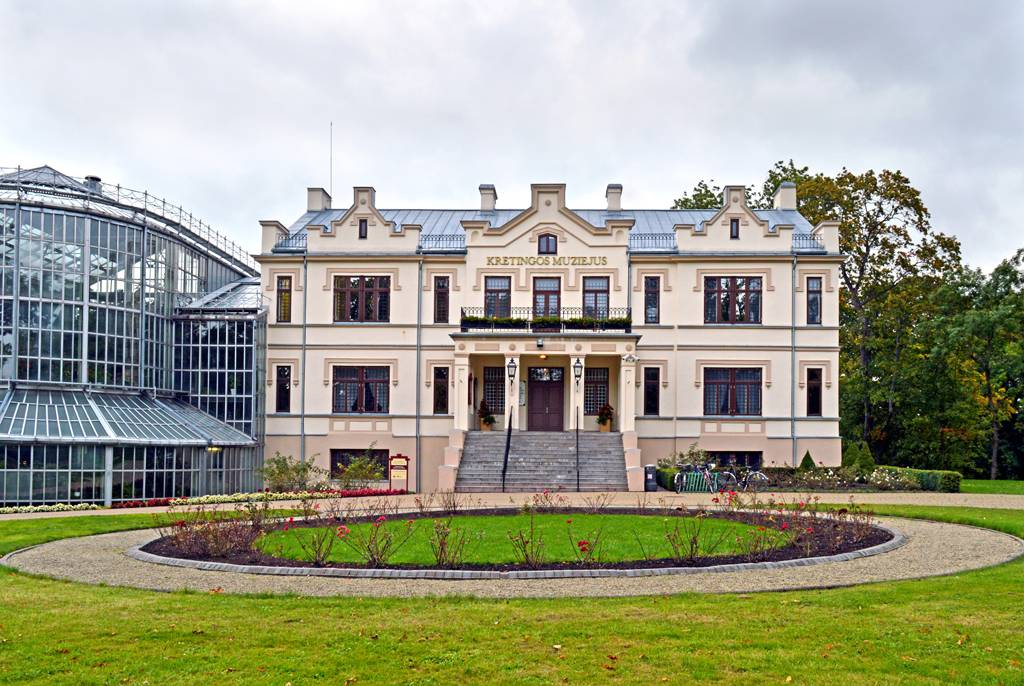
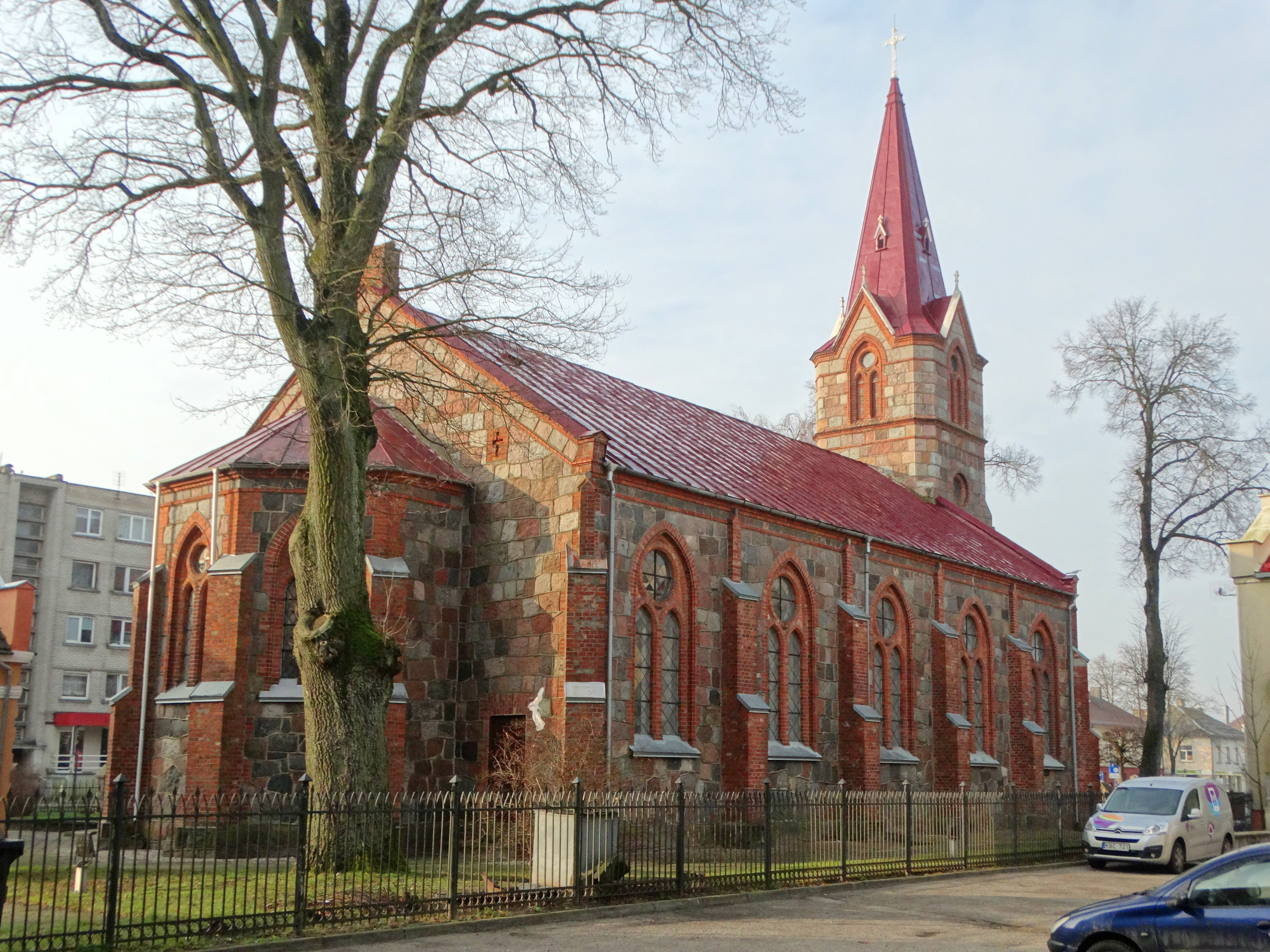
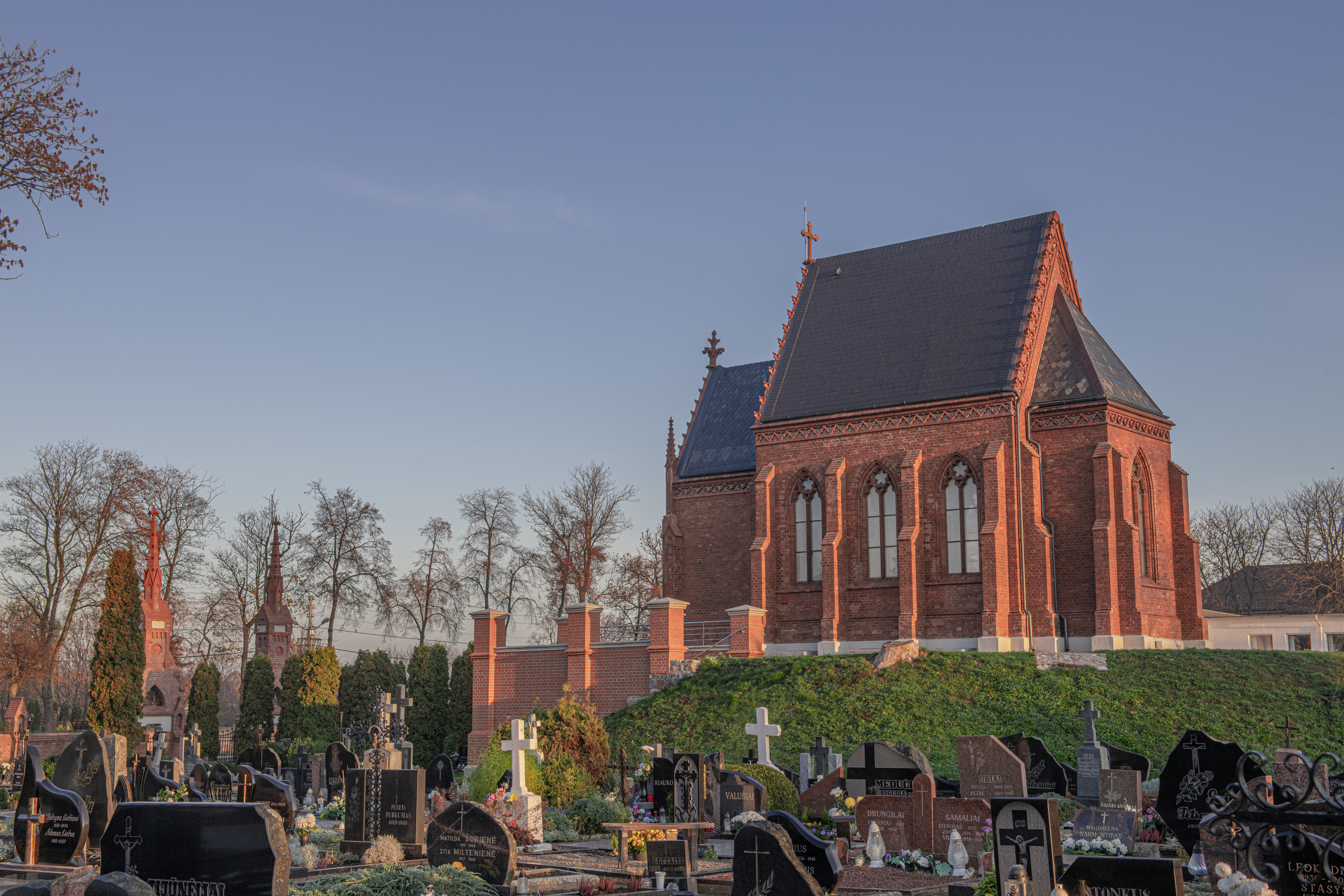
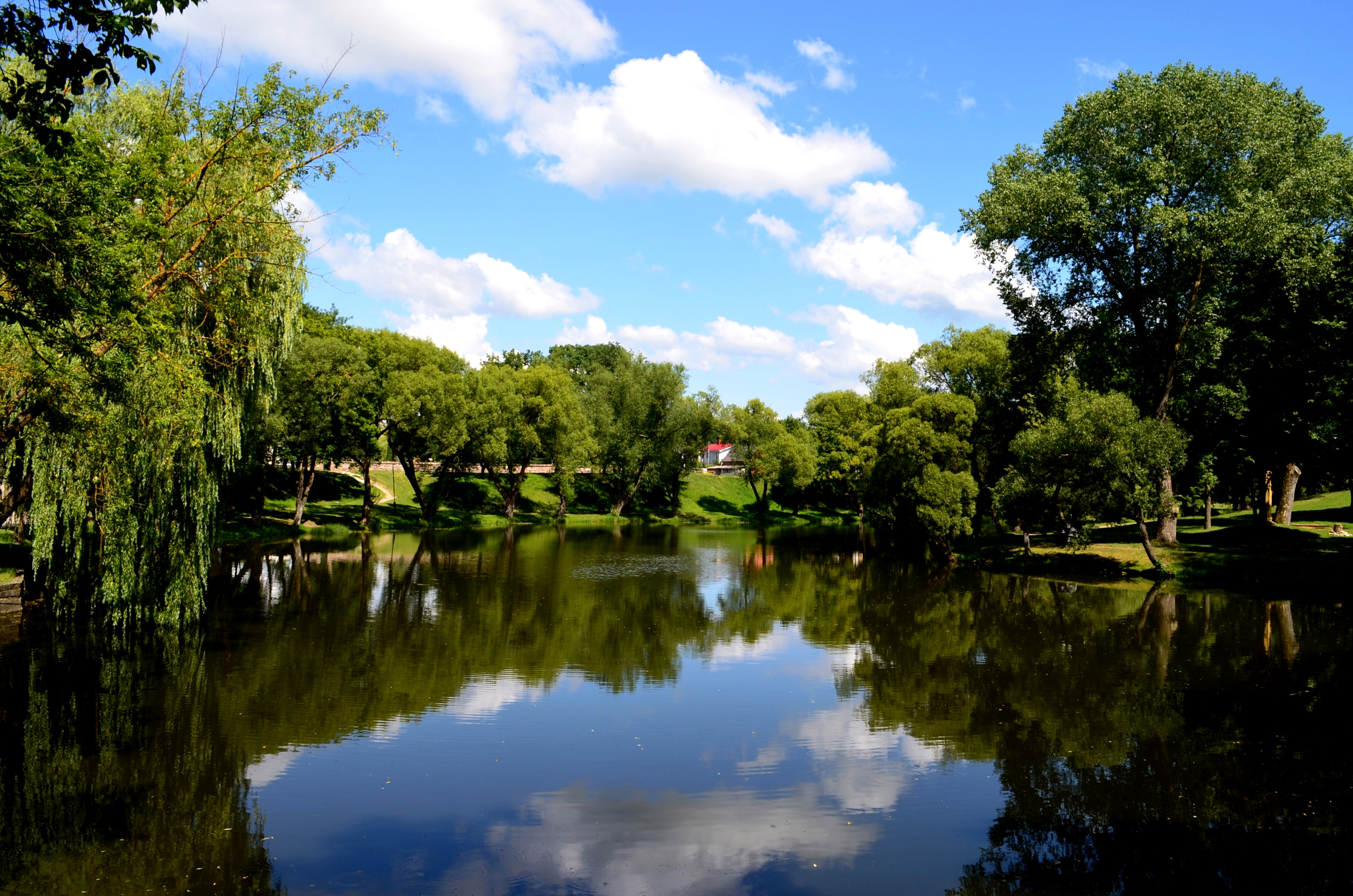
- Aerial view of Kretinga Church of the Lord's Revelation to Virgin Mary and Kretinga Bernardine Monastery Chapel of Jurgis Pabrėža Kretinga Museum, formerly manor Evangelical Lutheran Church Count Tiškevičius Family Chapel-Mausoleum Bernardine Monastery Pond

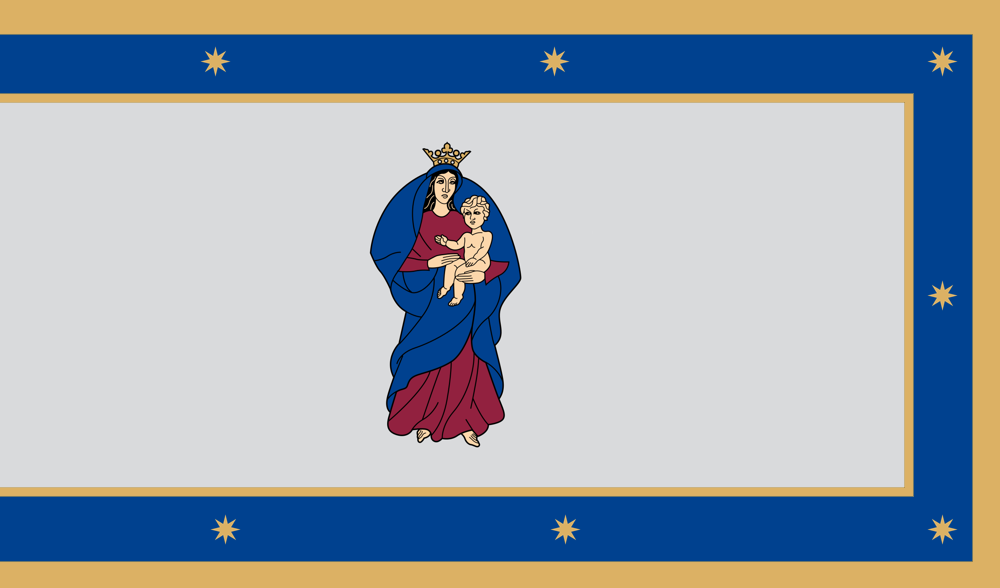
- Flag Coat of arms

- Location of Kretinga
- Coordinates: 55°53′24″N 21°14′32″E
- Country: Lithuania
- Ethnographic region: Samogitia
- County: Klaipėda County
- Municipality: Kretinga district municipality
- Eldership: Kretinga town eldership
- Capital of: Kretinga district municipality Kretinga town eldership Kretinga rural eldership
- First mentioned: 1253
- Granted municipal rights: 1607

Population (2022)
  - Total: 16,996
- Demonym(s): Kretingian(s) (English), kretingiškiai (Lithuanian)
- Time zone: UTC+2 (EET)
  - Summer (DST): UTC+3 (EEST)

Kretinga (Yiddish: קרעטינגע) is a city in Klaipėda County, in north-western Lithuania. It is the capital of the Kretinga District Municipality. It is located 12 km (7.5 mi) east of the popular Baltic Sea resort town of Palanga, and about 21 km (13 mi) north of Lithuania's 3rd largest city and principal seaport, Klaipėda.

The population was listed as 16,996 in the 2022 census. It is the 6th largest town in the ethnographic region of Samogitia and the 17th largest town in Lithuania.

== History ==
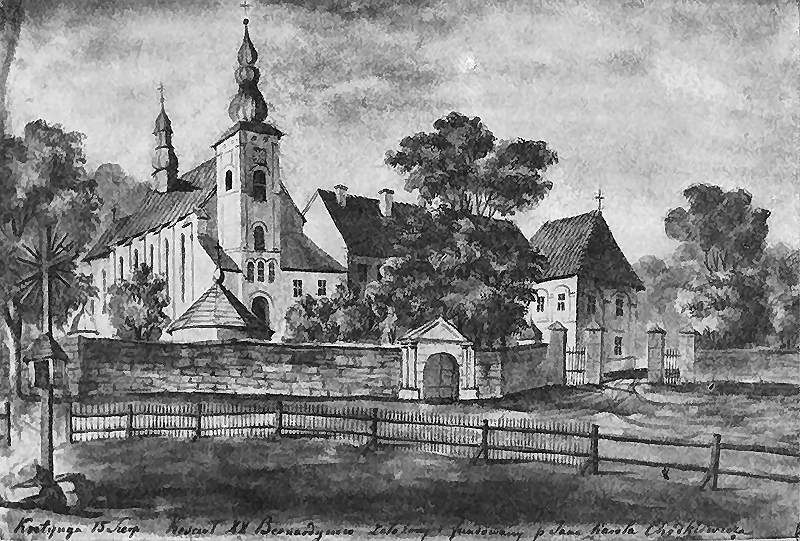
Kretinga Bernardine Monastery and the Church of the Lord's Revelation to Virgin Mary in the 19th century

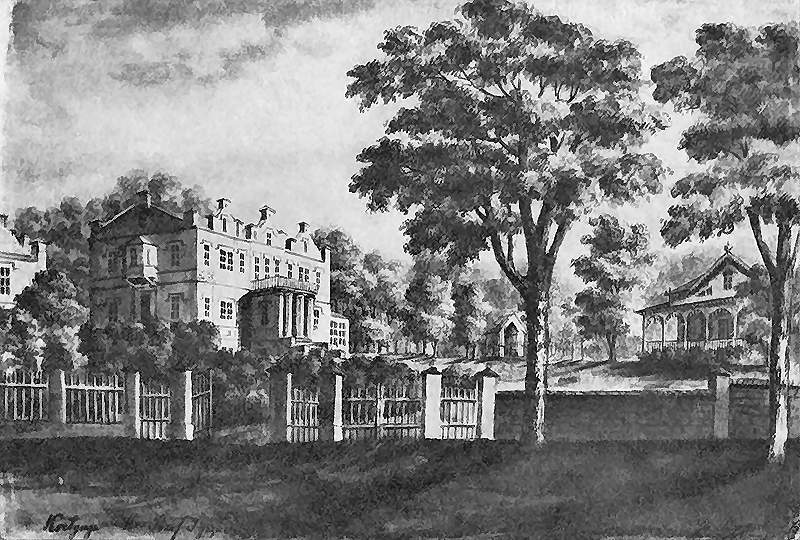
Tyszkiewicz Manor (now Kretinga Museum) in the 19th century

Kretinga is one of the oldest known towns in Lithuania. It was first mentioned in 1253 as castle of Cretyn under the charter of Bishop Heinrich of Courland.

In 1602, Jan Karol Chodkiewicz built the first wooden church in Kretinga and established a Benedictine monastery, which became a great success. After about ten years a new brick church with an impressive organ was built. In 1610 a church school was opened.

In 1609, Jan Karol Chodkiewicz announced that he would establish a new settlement next to the old village and would grant the new borough Magdeburg rights. The new borough adopted a coat of arms depicting the Blessed Virgin Mary with the Infant Jesus in her arms. Kretinga's patron saint remains the Blessed Virgin.

In 1621, the Sapieha family gained control of the city; they changed its coat of arms to represent Saint Casimir. In 1659 and 1710 the church and monastery were destroyed by Swedish armies. The Sapieha family helped to rebuild and improve it.

In 1720, the town came under the jurisdiction of the Massalski family. Ignacy Jakub Massalski opened a university preparatory school in 1774. The town lost its municipal rights after the partitions of the Polish–Lithuanian Commonwealth.

The town prospered during the 19th century as part of the Russian Empire. In 1882 the first telephone line in Lithuania connected Kretinga with Plungė and Rietavas. In 1875, Count Tiškevičius decided to establish his family estate in Kretinga; he purchased and rebuilt an old palace. Following the fashions of the Victorian era, the family landscaped it lavishly and built a greenhouse featuring exotic flowering plants and tropical fruits. In 1890 they installed electricity in the Manor House.

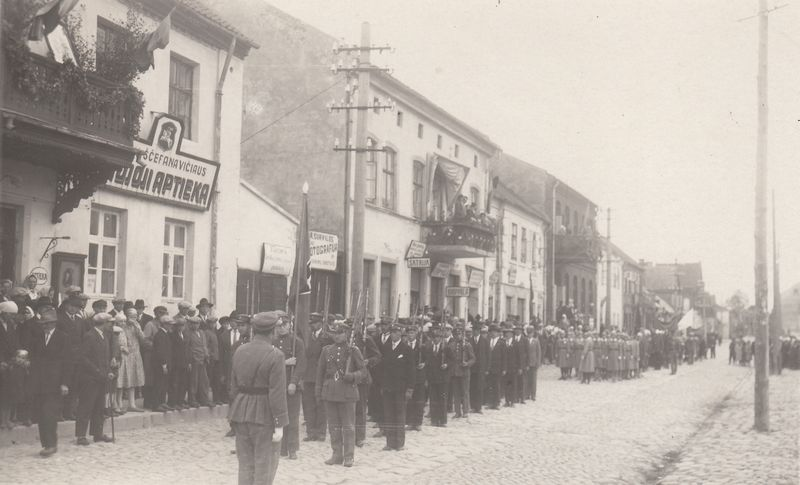
Commemoration of the 500th anniversary of the death of Vytautas the Great in Kretinga in 1930

During World War I, the Germans built a railway line connecting Bajorai, Kretinga, and the Latvian city of Priekule. In 1924 Kretinga regained its municipal rights. During the interwar period, the village of Kretingsodis, on the other side of the Akmena River, was incorporated into the borough. Kretinga gained greater importance after another railway line was built in 1932 that connected it to Šiauliai.

During the first Soviet occupation, under the Molotov–Ribbentrop Pact, a reign of terror resulted in local residents being arrested and, in some cases, executed without trial or deported to Siberia. A local lawyer, Vladas Petronaitis, was arrested and ultimately tortured to death by the Soviet intelligence agency.

After the outbreak of the World War II, Kretinga's city centre was bombarded and burned down. During World War II, the Nazi occupation saw the elimination of Kretinga's Jewish population. In June 1941, German forces and Lithuanian collaborators shot 214 men, with around 180 of them being Jewish, to pits in the nearby Kveciai forest that some of the Jewish men had been forced to dig. Several more mass shootings including women and children took place in July at the Kretinga Jewish cemetery. As in neighbouring Palanga, local Lithuanian nationalists volunteered to assist in the killing of Jewish citizens as soon as the German army and police units had arrived.

The Soviet occupation in 1945, led to further reductions in the population as refugees fled to the west and many of those trapped were deported to Siberia.

The local economy stagnated under Soviet occupation, which forcibly collectivized the farms in the area; it became an economic backwater.

Motiejus Valančius Public Library

Since Lithuania's independence in 1990, the town has made a recovery; it has much to offer by way of history and art. Kretinga hosts folk music festivals, theatricals, the Kretinga Festival, celebrations on Midsummer Night's Eve (Joninės) and Mardi Gras (Užgavėnės), and a Manorial Feast. The Manor House is now a museum housing artistic and archeological collections and a restaurant in the adjacent greenhouse, called "The Winter Garden". A Cambrian geothermal reservoir underlies the area, and the Vydmantai powerplant exploiting this resource is being built nearby.

In 1980 Kretinga Jurgis Pabrėža gymnasium was founded, which cooperates with many Lithuanian universities.

In 2025, Kretinga was designated as the Youth Capital of Lithuania, hosting over 80 events throughout the year aimed at engaging young people and young families. The activities included a wide range of sports competitions, creative workshops, international meetings and discussions, festivals, concerts, parties, and various competitions. These events brought together youth from all over Lithuania and abroad, providing platforms for self-expression, cultural exchange, and talent showcasing.

== Notable people ==
- Simonas Daukantas (1793–1864), author of the first history of Lithuania written in Lithuanian, briefly studied in Kretinga
- Berek Joselewicz (1764–1809), Jewish-Polish merchant and a colonel of the Polish Army
- Jurgis Pabrėža, first Lithuanian botanist; died and was buried in Kretinga at the Jurgis Pabrėža Grave Chapel
- Vladas Petronaitis (1888–1941), recipient of the Lithuanian Independence Medal; he was executed during the first Soviet occupation
- Linas Pilibaitis (born 1985), Lithuanian international footballer
- Rimvydas Šilbajoris, linguist, author, and professor at Ohio State University
- Adolfas Večerskis (born 1949), actor
- Antanas Vinkus (born 1942), Lithuanian diplomat

== Twin towns – sister cities ==
Kretinga is twinned with:

- Blankenfelde-Mahlow, Germany
- Bornholm, Denmark
- Gribskov, Denmark
- Märkisch-Oderland (district), Germany
- Osby, Sweden
- Viljandi, Estonia
